= Fritzie Zivic =

American boxer (1913–1984)

Personal information
- Nicknames: The Croat Comet; Mr. "Tough-on-Tough"
- Nationality: American
- Born: Ferdinand Henry John Zivcich; May 8, 1913 Lawrenceville, Pennsylvania
- Died: May 16, 1984 (aged 71) Pittsburgh, Pennsylvania
- Height: 5 ft 10 in (1.78 m)
- Weight: Welterweight world champion Lightweight early competitor

Boxing career
- Reach: 5 ft 11 in (1.80 m)
- Stance: Orthodox

Boxing record
- Total fights: 233
- Wins: 158
- Win by KO: 81
- Losses: 65
- Draws: 10

Fritzie Zivic (May 8, 1913 – May 16, 1984), born as Ferdinand Henry John Zivcich (Croatian: Živčić), was a Croat-American boxer who held the Undisputed World Welterweight Championship from October 4, 1940, until July 29, 1941. His managers included Luke Carney and, after 1942, Louis Stokan. He twice defeated all-time great Henry Armstrong. Zivic was inducted to the International Boxing Hall of Fame in 1993. Known as The Croat Comet, he was both the first world champion of Croat descent and the first world champion of Slavic descent.

== Early life ==
Zivic was born the youngest son of immigrant parents; his father Joseph Zivic (1870–1931) was Croatian, his mother, Mary Kepele Zivic (1872–1964) was Slovenian. His parents named him Ferdinand after Archduke Franz Ferdinand of Austria. As a young man, he followed the example of his four elder brothers, who boxed, and became known as the "Fighting Zivics". His brothers Pete and Jack, the first and second born, went to the 1920 Antwerp Olympics. Referring to his youth in the rough, tribal, and crowded Ninth Ward of Lawrenceville, Zivic later said, "You either had to fight or stay in the house. We went out."

== Professional career ==
Against one of his most skilled early opponents, Zivic defeated Charley Burley, fellow Pittsburgh boxer, for the only time on March 21, 1938, in their hometown. Characteristic of Zivic's later boxing, he dominated the in-fighting. Burley started well, but in the later rounds, the more experienced Zivic scored with rights hooks to the midsection and pulled Burley in during clinches to reduce Burley's long range game. In two other meetings, in June 1938, and July 1939, Zivic lost in ten round unanimous decisions. The well managed Burley would amass an impressive record of eighty-three with only twelve losses in his career.

Zivic lost to Billy Conn, 1939 world light heavyweight champion, on December 28, 1936 before 5,163 in a ten-round split decision at Duquesne Garden in Pittsburgh. In a relatively close bout, the referee scored for Zivic with 5 rounds to 4 for Conn, but both judges scored for Conn. About a minute into the third, Conn struck Zivic with a right to the chest that slowed him somewhat for the rest of the fight, though his effort was still considerable. In the first five rounds, Conn took considerable punishment, and the scoring favored Zivic, if not unanimously. Conn showed more energy, and footwork, and in the later rounds his long, punishing left scored consistent points against Zivic in long range fighting. Conn, at 6' 2", enjoyed around two inches of reach advantage over Zivic, which he used more frequently in later rounds. The bout included no knockdowns but in the fourth and fifth rounds, Zivic caught Conn on the ropes and belted him about head and body til it appeared a knockout was a possible outcome. From the sixth to the tenth, Conn fought more from a distance and in the eighth and ninth boxed brilliantly, using feints and footwork and his long, solid left. Zivic went to the body with hooks and crosses but failed to fatigue Conn who fought on and gained points. In an action packed tenth, Zivic first went inside and fought toe to toe with Conn, eventually getting him against the ropes, but Conn went back to boxing at long range and removed some of the loss in points he had suffered during the infighting, keeping the round close.

Zivic defeated Johnny Jadick, former junior welterweight champion, on February 11, 1937 in a six-round knockout at Duquesne Garden in Pittsburgh. In a decisive victory, Zivic had Jadick down for a nine count in the first round, but let up some in the next three. He put Jadick down again at the end of the second for a count of five, before the bell sounded. Jadick took the count of ten from a blow by Zivic, 1:16 into the sixth round. Zivic had previously lost to Jadick in a ten-round points decision in Washington in February 1935.

On January 20, 1939, Zivic defeated Jackie Burke, former holder of the Utah's Intermountain Welterweight Title, and Pacific Southwest Welterweight Title, in a ten-round mixed decision at the St. Louis Coliseum. Uppercuts to the head of Burke during the frequent infighting determined the outcome of the fight, and though both boxers got in telling blows, there were no knockdowns. In a close bout, the referee scored 51 to 49 for Zivic, and though one judge scored a draw, the remaining judge scored 53-47 in Zivic's favor.

He notably defeated Sammy Angott, reigning NBA lightweight champion, in a non-title bout on August 29, 1940, in a ten-round unanimous decision at Forbes Field in Pittsburgh. The bout was part of an elimination match to determine who would face Henry Armstrong for his world welterweight title. Zivic took the last six of the ten rounds. According to Zivic later, his purse of $3,200 for the win, was the largest he had yet received.

=== Taking the world welterweight title against Henry Armstrong, October, 1940 ===
In the most significant win of his career, Zivic upset Henry "Hammering Hank" Armstrong on October 4, 1940 in a fifteen-round decision before 12,081 at Madison Square Garden, taking the world welterweight title despite being a 4-1 underdog. He started by scoring with short right uppercuts in the early rounds. By the ninth, Armstrong's left eye was a slit, and his right nearly as swollen, allowing Zivic to easily dance away when Armstrong attempted to mount a desperate clumsy attempt at a knockout in the final round. Zivic mounted a slow effective attack, but held no wide margin, as the referee and both judges awarded him eight of the fifteen rounds in the close bout. The Associated Press gave Zivic nine rounds with Armstrong six. Zivic did not take a points lead until the sixth and seventh when he banged away with short, accurate, right uppercuts.

According to Zivic's account, the first bout with Armstrong included questionable tactics and fouls. Zivic claimed Armstrong started out fighting that way, noting, "Henry's givin' me the elbows and the shoulders and the top of the head, and I can give that stuff back pretty good, but I don't dare to or maybe they'll throw me out of the ring." By the seventh round, Zivic had had enough, and began responding in kind. At least one source noted that the referee, aware of the rough fighting that could be called as fouls gave up, and allowed the combatants to fight using whatever methods they were comfortable with, barring obvious fouls.

==== Winning title rematch with Henry Armstrong, January, 1941 ====
In his most memorable victory, he won the world welterweight title rematch with Hank Armstrong in a twelfth-round technical knockout, at Madison Square Garden, on January 17, 1941. It was the first knockout ever registered against Armstrong in his stellar career as a multiple weight class champion. The impressive crowd of 23,190 fans, considered the largest indoor crowd ever to see a professional boxing match, witnessed Armstrong, the former welterweight champion, nearly helpless when the referee called the match 52 seconds into the twelfth round. As early as the first round, Zivic jabbed easily at Armstrong's open face, and then looped in uppercuts. The United Press gave Armstrong only the third and the eleventh. In the third, Armstrong was able to stagger Zivic briefly with hard hooks to the head. As the bout wore on, Armstrong tired badly, and was continuously the victim of Zivic's short uppercuts, which snapped back his head. He was down in the sixth for a no-count from a right uppercut by Zivic. In the eighth, the referee stopped to examine the cuts on Armstrong caused by the battering he took in the round.

Armstrong made a valiant effort in the eleventh with a barrage of hooks to the head and body of Zivic, allowing him to take the round. Armstrong caught Zivic in a corner and battered him with short jarring blows and then landed a right to the face, but it was a last valiant effort. The ring doctor examined Armstrong after the round ended, and allowed him to continue, but the referee stopped the fight in the twelfth when Zivic lashed his left repeatedly at the face of Armstrong.

=== Losing the world welterweight title against Fred "Red" Cochran, July, 1941 ===
Zivic lost his world welterweight title in a fifteen-round decision against Red Cochran before 10,000 fans on July 29, 1941 at Rupert Stadium in Newark, NJ. Cochrane effectively threw left hooks to the belly against the straight rights of Zivic. He butted Zivic with his head, when Zivic attempted to illegally put an arm around his neck to hammer him with his left. In a back-alley brawl type of fighting, Cochrane threw a left hook into Zivic's groin after he claimed to have been continuously thumbed in the eye by Zivic, though the resulting penalty call gave the round to Zivic. Zivic's late comeback attempt in the final five rounds was not overlooked by the press, as many considered him obtaining more points in each of the last five rounds. The referee gave Cochran seven rounds, four to Zivic, and four even, with the single judge scoring the same. The United Press, however gave six rounds to each boxer, with three as draws. Most believed Cochrane's ability to force the fighting throughout and land more telling blows made him deserve the close decision.

Immediately after his loss of the title, on September 15, 1941, Zivic achieved a fifth-round knockout of Milt Aaron in the feature match at Pittsburgh's Forbes Field, before an appreciative hometown audience of 24,972 fans. As Aron was trying to exit a corner of the ring, Zivic knocked him out with a bolo punch, a crossing right hand smash to the jaw, 1:58 into the fifth. Typical of Zivic's rough style of boxing, he excelled in the infighting in the first four rounds. Zivic had previously lost to Aron in an eight-round knockout on December 27, 1939. In the exciting match, Aron was down three times in round two, but Aron put Zivic down once in the seventh. After taking a beating in the eighth, Zivic uncorked a terrific right that caught Zivic squarely on his jaw putting him down, then sealed the deal after he got up with a left and right on the chin for the count.

=== Boxing highlights after loss of title ===
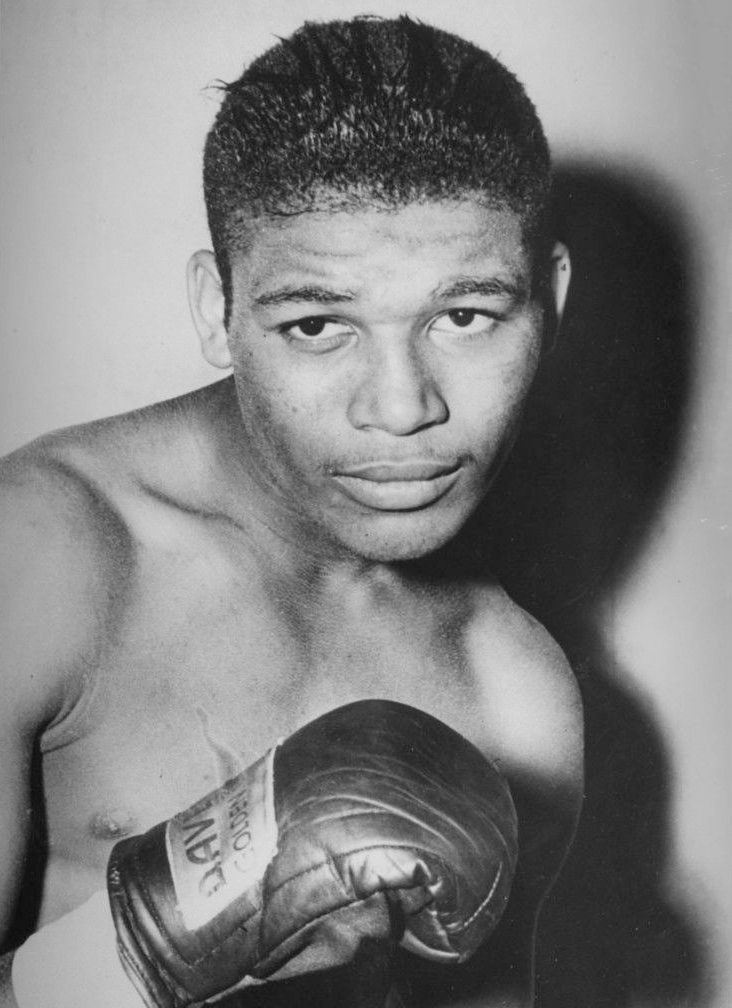
Sugar Ray Robinson

He lost to the great Sugar Ray Robinson, a future Hall of Famer, on January 16, 1942 in a tenth-round technical knockout before 15,745 fans at Madison Square Garden. Robinson used blinding speed in the opening rounds to overwhelm Zivic. He took the sixth with sharp lefts, but Zivic clearly won the seventh with hooks to the midsection. Robinson dropped Zivic with a long right overhand smash late in the ninth, and floored him with a two fisted attack in the tenth. Zivic was trying to get to his feet at the count of six, but the referee stopped the bout 31 seconds into the round before he could fully rise. In what was scored as a close bout, the Associated Press gave Robinson five of the nine, while Zivic took three and one was even. It was only the second time Zivic had been stopped before the end of a bout. Impressively, for Robinson, it was his twenty-seventh straight win, with twenty-one via knockout.

Zivic defeated Italian boxer "Izzy" Anthony Jannazzo on March 9, 1942, leaving Janazzo unable to return to the ring for the fifth round at Duquesne Gardens in Pittsburgh. Zivic swarmed all over Jannazzo in the first, closing Jannazzo's eye in the second, and firing at it in the third and fourth, till Januzzo, unable to see, failed to answer the fifth round bell. A skilled middleweight, Jannazzo had contended for the world welterweight title against Barney Ross in November 1936 at Madison Square Garden.

On April 13, 1942, Zivic defeated Jewish Canadian boxer Maxie Berger, former holder of the Montreal Athletic Commission's Junior World Welterweight Title, in a ten-round points decision at Duquesne Gardens in Pittsburgh. A crowd of 5,000 watched Zivic knock Berger to the canvas a total of seven times, over the fourth, sixth, eighth, and tenth. Berger rallied in the tenth to keep he round even in scoring. Berger's toughest round was the sixth when he was down for counts of nine, eight, and two. In the fourth, Berger was hit by a low right from Zivic, and changed to more defensive tactics afterward, which reduced the slight points advantage he may have held in the first three rounds. With the exception of the seventh, the fifth through the eighth were all Zivic's who gained a strong lead in points.

He defeated Lew Jenkins, a 1940 world lightweight champion, on May 25, 1942, before 12,134 fans, in a decisive ten-round technical knockout in Pittsburgh. With sharp, rapid two fisted punching, Zivic carved Jenkins' face severely, connecting often. His ripping rights and left hooks opened two old cuts on Jenkins' face early in the bout. After the ninth, a ring doctor refused to allow a badly battered and bleeding Jenkins to return to the ring for the tenth round. Though not officially considered knockdowns, five times in the second, sixth, and eighth rounds, Jenkins spun around and fell to the canvas. He had drawn with Jenkins on December 20, 1940 in a ten-round points decision at the fabled Madison Square Garden.

==== Losses to lightweight champion Beau Jack, February, March 1943 ====
Zivic lost to reigning world lightweight champion and future Hall of Fame boxer, Beau Jack in a non-title bout on March 5, 1943 in a unanimous but close twelve-round decision in Madison Square Garden before a crowd of 8,813. All three of the judges gave Zivic five rounds in the bout. In the bitterly contested brawl, both boxers lost a round for low blows. Zivic took the sixth, uncharacteristically fighting at long range, but the seventh was closer with a slight edge for Jack. Oddly, Zivic took a beating in the eighth but won the round on a foul, while Jack took punishment in the ninth, but also won the bout on a foul. Zivic took the tenth, but the eleventh and twelfth appeared even because of Jack's strong efforts and last attempts at a knockout. Zivic enjoyed a ten-pound weight advantage as well as an advantage in reach of around two inches. Zivic had lost to Jack two months earlier on February 5, 1943, and though Beau was a 3-1 favorite, Zivic had nearly come out ahead of the twelve-round decision before an impressive 21,240 at Madision Square Garden. A low blow in the eighth round made by Zivic cost him the round in the close bout and caused some controversy. The Associated Press gave five rounds to Jack, four to Zivic, and one even. If not for the foul call against Zivic in the eighth, the AP scoring would have been a draw, though the official ring judges considered Jack the victor by a slightly larger margin.

==== Victory over Jake LaMotta, July, 1943 ====
He defeated the great Jake LaMotta only once in a fifteen-round split decision in Pittsburgh on July 12, 1943 before a crowd of 15,562. LaMotta at twenty, ten years younger than Zivic, rushed and landed clean blows throughout the bout, but Zivic scored with his signature left jab, and retained his strength till the tenth round, when he opened up on LaMotta with frequent blows. In the fifth and sixth, Zivic scored well with his left, but was behind in the early rounds, particularly taking a beating in the first. The boxers appeared to fight cautiously realizing the power of their opponent. Zivic had dropped a bout in the previous month to LaMotta in a ten-round split decision, another close bout in Pittsburgh. Zivic lost in two other meetings, one in January 1944, despite LaMotta losing two rounds from low blows, and one in November 1943 in a relatively close bout in Madison Square Garden.

Zivic lost to reigning NYSAC world lightweight champion Bob Montgomery on August 23, 1943 in a non-title, ten round unanimous decision at Shibe Park in Philadelphia. In a decisive loss, the referee and one judge scored eight rounds for Montgomery, two for Zivic, though the second judge gave only five rounds to Montgomery with three to Zivic, and two even.

Zivic first lost to Freddy Archer on March 29, 1944 in a ten-round points decision at Elizabeth, Pennsylvania. Though Zivic was favored at 7-5, Archer mounted a relentless attack which at its best featured stinging left hooks to the head and body. Archer took a points lead early with a smashing away with both hands, causing Zivic to retreat or tie him up in clinches. With a clear margin of victory, the referee gave Archer six rounds, with only the fourth and seventh to Zivic, and the sixth and ninth even. Though going into the seventh, Zivic scored with one of his strongest left and rights to the head, Archer shook them off and finished the round without allowing Zivic to close for a knockout.

Before a respectable crowd of 10,000, in a ten-round split decision on June 26, 1944, Zivic lost to 1946 world welterweight contender black boxer Tommy Bell, who had to come from behind to take Zivic in the closing rounds. Zivic was serving as a private in the Army Air Corps, and had been away from the ring for three months. In the opening rounds, Bell was schooled by Zivic, who made him constantly miss and dominated at close quarters. The referee and one judge gave only two rounds to Zivic, but the Associated Press saw differently, scoring four for Bell with only three for Zivic with three even. Bell, a quality opponent who would challenge Robinson for the world welterweight title in 1946, made his thirty-eighth consecutive win with the victory. While still in the Army, Zivic defeated Billy Arnold on January 5, 1945, in a convincing eight round mixed decision at Madison Square Garden before an impressive house of 16,923. Zivic, now a corporal, took a points lead with upper-cuts, short hooks, and basic brawling, and dominated the infighting. Zivic staggered Arnold in the third, fifth and eighth.

He never challenged for a world title after 1941, but from 1941 to 1946, he fought the great boxers Sugar Ray Robinson, Beau Jack, Tommy Bell, Billy Arnold, Jake LaMotta, and Freddie Archer. In all, he met seven future Hall of Famers and nine world champions. His career record was 158–64–9, with 80 knockouts.

== Life after boxing ==
Although his fighting tactics included thumbing his opponents in the eye, using his knees or elbows as weapons after a punch, or punching in banned areas, he was also known for apologizing for his tactics to his opponent. "He had a body like a wire, a mind like a chess player, a quick wit and a splendid smile."

Zivic served in the Army Air Corps during the end of WWII, being stationed for a time at San Antonio's Normoyle Field, where he continued his boxing schedule in Texas and the Southwest.

He attempted a wide range of professions starting with promoting, and managing boxers. Between the mid-1950s and mid-1960s, he worked in a steel mill, sold wine, whiskey and beer, bartended, worked as a disc jockey, and labored on a county work crew. He eventually settled into his profession as a steel fabricator or boilermaker with a union card, and got steady work in construction. A popular boxer during his career, he could draw audiences as an after-dinner speaker on occasion.

He died after a long battle with Alzheimer's disease in 1984 after a three-year stay at Veteran's Hospital in Aspinwall, Pennsylvania, and was buried in Pittsburgh's St. Nicholas Cemetery. A stroke had left him speechless around 1982 when he was first hospitalized. He was inducted into the International Boxing Hall of Fame in 1993. He was survived by his wife Helen, two sons, a daughter, and four grandchildren.

In 2024, he was included in the Croatian American Sports Hall of Fame.

== Quotes ==
- "You're boxing, you're not playing the piano."

== Professional boxing record ==
All information in this section is derived from BoxRec, unless otherwise stated.

=== Official record ===
233 fights	157 wins	65 losses
By knockout	81	4
By decision	75	61
By disqualification	1	0
Draws	9	
Newspaper decisions/draws	2	

All newspaper decisions are officially regarded as “no decision” bouts and are not counted in the win/loss/draw column.

No.	Result	Record	Opponent	Type	Round, time	Date	Location	Notes
233	Win	157–65–9 (2)	Eddie Steele	UD	10	Jan 17, 1949	Municipal Auditorium, Augusta, Georgia, US	
232	Win	156–65–9 (2)	Al Reid	PTS	10	Jan 12, 1949	City Auditorium, Macon, Georgia, US	
231	Draw	155–65–9 (2)	Eddie Steele	PTS	10	Oct 28, 1948	City Auditorium, Macon, Georgia, US	
230	Loss	155–65–8 (2)	Kid Azteca	KO	5 (10)	Feb 1, 1947	Mexico City, Distrito Federal, Mexico	
229	Loss	155–64–8 (2)	Clyde Gordon	UD	9	Jan 8, 1947	Civic Center Arena, Miami, Florida, US	
228	Win	155–63–8 (2)	Bobby Britton	UD	10	Dec 10, 1946	Ellis Auditorium, Memphis, Tennessee, US	
227	Loss	154–63–8 (2)	Pete Mead	PTS	10	Dec 6, 1946	Civic Auditorium, Grand Rapids, Michigan, US	
226	Loss	154–62–8 (2)	Ralph Zannelli	PTS	10	Dec 2, 1946	Rhode Island Auditorium, Providence, Rhode Island, US	
225	Draw	154–61–8 (2)	Jimmy McGriff	PTS	10	Nov 18, 1946	Turner's Arena, Washington, D.C., US	
224	Loss	154–61–7 (2)	Al Mobley	PTS	8	Nov 12, 1946	Arena, Trenton, New Jersey, US	
223	Win	154–60–7 (2)	Russell Wilhite	TKO	5 (10)	Oct 29, 1946	Memphis, Tennessee, US	
222	Loss	153–60–7 (2)	Tommy Lemmon	SD	10	May 27, 1946	Auditorium, Milwaukee, Wisconsin, US	
221	Loss	153–59–7 (2)	California Jackie Wilson	UD	10	May 14, 1946	Olympic Auditorium, Los Angeles, California, US	
220	Win	153–58–7 (2)	Joey Martinez	RTD	8 (10)	May 1, 1946	Wichita, Kansas, US	
219	Loss	152–58–7 (2)	Howard Bleyhl	PTS	10	Apr 29, 1946	City Auditorium, Omaha, Nebraska, US	
218	Win	152–57–7 (2)	Don Lee	UD	10	Apr 18, 1946	Legion Stadium, Hollywood, California, US	
217	Win	151–57–7 (2)	Lincoln Stanley	PTS	10	Apr 12, 1946	Auditorium, Portland, Oregon, US	
216	Draw	150–57–7 (2)	Manuel Villa I	MD	10	Apr 5, 1946	Liberty Hall, El Paso, Texas, US	
215	Loss	150–57–6 (2)	Tony Elizondo	UD	10	Mar 26, 1946	Municipal Auditorium, San Antonio, Texas, US	
214	Win	150–56–6 (2)	Levi Southall	NWS	10	Mar 19, 1946	Memorial Hall, Kansas City, Missouri, US	
213	Loss	150–56–6 (1)	Aaron Perry	PTS	10	Feb 25, 1946	Uline Arena, Washington, D.C., US	
212	Loss	150–55–6 (1)	O'Neill Bell	UD	10	Feb 1, 1946	Olympia Stadium, Detroit, Michigan, US	
211	Loss	150–54–6 (1)	Al Priest	UD	10	Jan 15, 1946	Boston Garden, Boston, Massachusetts, US	
210	Loss	150–53–6 (1)	Cecil Hudson	UD	10	Dec 10, 1945	Madison Square Garden, New York City, New York, US	
209	Loss	150–52–6 (1)	Joe Curcio	PTS	10	Nov 13, 1945	Armory, Elizabeth, New Jersey, US	
208	Loss	150–51–6 (1)	Freddie Archer	UD	10	Nov 2, 1945	St. Nicholas Arena, New York City, New York, US	
207	Loss	150–50–6 (1)	Joe Reddick	SD	10	Oct 20, 1945	Ridgewood Grove, New York City, New York, US	
206	Win	150–49–6 (1)	Billy Deeg	PTS	10	Sep 18, 1945	Municipal Auditorium, Oklahoma City, Oklahoma, US	
205	Loss	149–49–6 (1)	Paul Altman	PTS	10	Sep 12, 1945	Coliseum, Houston, Texas, US	
204	Loss	149–48–6 (1)	Bill McDowell	PTS	10	Jul 16, 1945	Pelican Stadium, New Orleans, Louisiana, US	
203	Loss	149–47–6 (1)	Ossie Harris	SD	10	Jul 10, 1945	Hickey Park, Millvale, Pennsylvania, US	
202	Loss	149–46–6 (1)	Rueben Shank	SD	10	Jul 3, 1945	Forbes Field, Pittsburgh, Pennsylvania, US	
201	Loss	149–45–6 (1)	Harold Green	UD	10	Jun 22, 1945	Madison Square Garden, New York City, New York, US	
200	Win	149–44–6 (1)	Baby Zavala	KO	4 (10)	Jun 12, 1945	Brackenridge Park, San Antonio, Texas, US	
199	Win	148–44–6 (1)	Pat Saia	UD	10	May 8, 1945	City Auditorium, Beaumont, Texas, US	
198	Win	147–44–6 (1)	Kid Azteca	MD	10	May 7, 1945	Municipal Auditorium, San Antonio, Texas, US	
197	Win	146–44–6 (1)	Manuel Villa I	KO	8 (10)	Apr 3, 1945	Municipal Auditorium, San Antonio, Texas, US	
196	Win	145–44–6 (1)	Benny Evans	TKO	8 (10)	Mar 22, 1945	City Auditorium, Galveston, Texas, US	
195	Win	144–44–6 (1)	Bill McDowell	UD	10	Mar 6, 1945	City Auditorium, Galveston, Texas, US	
194	Win	143–44–6 (1)	Kid Estrada	KO	2 (6)	Feb 22, 1945	Camp Maxey, Texas, US	
193	Win	142–44–6 (1)	Billy Arnold	MD	8	Jan 5, 1945	Madison Square Garden, New York City, New York, US	
192	Win	141–44–6 (1)	Kid Azteca	MD	10	Dec 12, 1944	Municipal Auditorium, San Antonio, Texas, US	
191	Win	140–44–6 (1)	Manuel Villa I	KO	6 (10)	Nov 29, 1944	Sportatorium, Dallas, Texas, US	
190	Win	139–44–6 (1)	Chuck Hirst	KO	5 (10)	Nov 14, 1944	City Auditorium, Houston, Texas, US	
189	Win	138–44–6 (1)	Pat Saia	TKO	8 (10)	Oct 18, 1944	Sportatorium, Dallas, Texas, US	
188	Loss	137–44–6 (1)	Tommy Roman	UD	10	Oct 16, 1944	Municipal Auditorium, Shreveport, Louisiana, US	
187	Win	137–43–6 (1)	Artie Dorrell	TKO	7 (10)	Sep 26, 1944	City Auditorium, Galveston, Texas, US	
186	Win	136–43–6 (1)	Felix Morales	KO	2 (10)	Sep 12, 1944	Municipal Auditorium, San Antonio, Texas, US	
185	Win	135–43–6 (1)	Pete DeRuzza	TKO	8 (10)	Aug 1, 1944	Houston, Texas, US	
184	Loss	134–43–6 (1)	Tommy Bell	SD	10	Jun 26, 1944	Forbes Field, Pittsburgh, Pennsylvania, US	
183	Loss	134–42–6 (1)	Freddie Archer	PTS	10	Mar 29, 1944	Armory, Elizabeth, New Jersey, US	
182	Win	134–41–6 (1)	Harry Teaney	PTS	10	Mar 24, 1944	Auditorium, Milwaukee, Wisconsin, US	
181	Loss	133–41–6 (1)	Jake LaMotta	UD	10	Jan 14, 1944	Olympia Stadium, Detroit, Michigan, US	
180	Win	133–40–6 (1)	Ossie Harris	KO	10 (10)	Jan 3, 1944	Duquesne Gardens, Pittsburgh, Pennsylvania, US	
179	Loss	132–40–6 (1)	Ralph Zannelli	UD	10	Dec 20, 1943	Boston Garden, Boston, Massachusetts, US	
178	Loss	132–39–6 (1)	Jake LaMotta	SD	10	Nov 12, 1943	Madison Square Garden, New York City, New York, US	
177	Win	132–38–6 (1)	Bobby Richardson	UD	10	Oct 29, 1943	Chicago Stadium, Chicago, Illinois, US	
176	Loss	131–38–6 (1)	Jose Basora	UD	10	Oct 15, 1943	Olympia Stadium, Detroit, Michigan, US	
175	Win	131–37–6 (1)	Vinnie Vines	KO	1 (10)	Sep 10, 1943	Madison Square Garden, New York City, New York, US	
174	Loss	130–37–6 (1)	Bob Montgomery	UD	10	Aug 23, 1943	Shibe Park, Philadelphia, Pennsylvania, US	
173	Win	130–36–6 (1)	Young Kid McCoy	TKO	4 (10)	Aug 9, 1943	Forbes Field, Pittsburgh, Pennsylvania, US	
172	Win	129–36–6 (1)	Jake LaMotta	SD	15	Jul 12, 1943	Forbes Field, Pittsburgh, Pennsylvania, US	
171	Loss	128–36–6 (1)	Jake LaMotta	SD	10	Jun 10, 1943	Forbes Field, Pittsburgh, Pennsylvania, US	
170	Win	128–35–6 (1)	Johnny Roszina	TKO	8 (10)	Apr 30, 1943	Auditorium, Milwaukee, Wisconsin, US	
169	Loss	127–35–6 (1)	Beau Jack	UD	12	Mar 5, 1943	Madison Square Garden, New York City, New York, US	
168	Win	127–34–6 (1)	Mayon Padlo	PTS	10	Feb 16, 1943	Duquesne Gardens, Pittsburgh, Pennsylvania, US	
167	Loss	126–34–6 (1)	Beau Jack	UD	10	Feb 5, 1943	Madison Square Garden, New York City, New York, US	
166	Win	126–33–6 (1)	Carmen Notch	UD	10	Dec 15, 1942	Duquesne Gardens, Pittsburgh, Pennsylvania, US	
165	Loss	125–33–6 (1)	Sheik Rangel	PTS	10	Nov 16, 1942	Civic Auditorium, San Francisco, California, US	
164	Loss	125–32–6 (1)	Henry Armstrong	UD	10	Oct 26, 1942	Civic Auditorium, San Francisco, California, US	
163	Win	125–31–6 (1)	Tito Taylor	PTS	10	Oct 13, 1942	Auditorium, Milwaukee, Wisconsin, US	
162	Win	124–31–6 (1)	Johnny Walker	UD	10	Sep 21, 1942	Convention Hall, Philadelphia, Pennsylvania, US	
161	Win	123–31–6 (1)	Freddie Cochrane	UD	10	Sep 10, 1942	Madison Square Garden, New York City, New York, US	
160	Win	122–31–6 (1)	Garvey Young	TKO	6 (10)	Aug 13, 1942	Madison Square Garden, New York City, New York, US	
159	Win	121–31–6 (1)	Norman Rubio	TKO	9 (10)	Jul 27, 1942	Forbes Field, Pittsburgh, Pennsylvania, US	
158	Loss	120–31–6 (1)	Norman Rubio	PTS	10	Jun 29, 1942	Meadowbrook Bowl, Newark, New Jersey, US	
157	Win	120–30–6 (1)	Bobby Britton	TKO	4 (10)	Jun 22, 1942	Kingston Armory, Kingston, Pennsylvania, US	
156	Win	119–30–6 (1)	Rueben Shank	PTS	10	Jun 4, 1942	Armory, Minneapolis, Minnesota, US	
155	Win	118–30–6 (1)	Lew Jenkins	TKO	10 (10)	May 25, 1942	Forbes Field, Pittsburgh, Pennsylvania, US	
154	Loss	117–30–6 (1)	Reuben Shank	UD	10	Apr 23, 1942	Armory, Minneapolis, Minnesota, US	
153	Win	117–29–6 (1)	Maxie Berger	PTS	10	Apr 13, 1942	Duquesne Gardens, Pittsburgh, Pennsylvania, US	
152	Win	116–29–6 (1)	Bill McDowell	TKO	6 (10)	Mar 30, 1942	Laurel Garden, Newark, New Jersey, US	
151	Win	115–29–6 (1)	Izzy Jannazzo	RTD	4 (10)	Mar 9, 1942	Duquesne Gardens, Pittsburgh, Pennsylvania, US	
150	Loss	114–29–6 (1)	Tony Motisi	UD	10	Feb 27, 1942	Coliseum, Chicago, Illinois, US	
149	Win	114–28–6 (1)	Raul Carabantes	PTS	10	Feb 9, 1942	Duquesne Gardens, Pittsburgh, Pennsylvania, US	
148	Loss	113–28–6 (1)	Sugar Ray Robinson	TKO	10 (12)	Jan 16, 1942	Madison Square Garden, New York City, New York, US	
147	Draw	113–27–6 (1)	Young Kid McCoy	PTS	10	Dec 12, 1941	Madison Square Garden, New York City, New York, US	
146	Win	113–27–5 (1)	Harry Weekly	TKO	9 (10)	Dec 1, 1941	Uline Arena, Washington, D.C., US	
145	Win	112–27–5 (1)	Phil Furr	UD	10	Nov 26, 1941	Uline Arena, Washington, D.C., US	
144	Loss	111–27–5 (1)	Sugar Ray Robinson	UD	10	Oct 31, 1941	Madison Square Garden, New York City, New York, US	
143	Win	111–26–5 (1)	Milt Aron	KO	5 (10)	Sep 15, 1941	Forbes Field, Pittsburgh, Pennsylvania, US	
142	Loss	110–26–5 (1)	Freddie Cochrane	PTS	15	Jul 29, 1941	Ruppert Stadium, Newark, New Jersey, US	Lost NYSAC, NBA, and The Ring welterweight titles
141	Win	110–25–5 (1)	Johnny Barbara	UD	12	Jul 14, 1941	Gardens, Philadelphia, Pennsylvania, US	
140	Win	109–25–5 (1)	Al Davis	TKO	10 (12)	Jul 2, 1941	Polo Grounds, New York City, New York, US	
139	Win	108–25–5 (1)	Tony Marteliano	UD	10	May 2, 1941	New York Coliseum, New York City, New York, US	
138	Loss	107–25–5 (1)	Mike Kaplan	UD	10	Apr 18, 1941	Boston Garden, Boston, Massachusetts, US	
137	Win	107–24–5 (1)	Dick Demaray	TKO	5 (12)	Apr 4, 1941	Armory, Minneapolis, Minnesota, US	
136	Win	106–24–5 (1)	Felix Garcia	KO	2 (10)	Mar 20, 1941	Coliseum, Baltimore, Maryland, US	
135	Win	105–24–5 (1)	Saverio Turiello	PTS	10	Mar 17, 1941	Duquesne Gardens, Pittsburgh, Pennsylvania, US	
134	Win	104–24–5 (1)	Henry Armstrong	TKO	12 (15), 0:52	Jan 17, 1941	Madison Square Garden, New York City, New York, US	Retained NYSAC, NBA, and The Ring welterweight titles
133	Draw	103–24–5 (1)	Lew Jenkins	PTS	10	Dec 20, 1940	Madison Square Garden, New York City, New York, US	
132	Win	103–24–4 (1)	Ronnie Beaudin	TKO	3 (10)	Nov 26, 1940	Memorial Auditorium, Buffalo, New York, US	
131	Win	102–24–4 (1)	Al Davis	DQ	2 (10)	Nov 15, 1940	Madison Square Garden, New York City, New York, US	
130	Win	101–24–4 (1)	Henry Armstrong	UD	15	Oct 4, 1940	Madison Square Garden, New York City, New York, US	Won NYSAC, NBA, and The Ring welterweight titles
129	Win	100–24–4 (1)	Sammy Angott	UD	10	Aug 29, 1940	Forbes Field, Pittsburgh, Pennsylvania, US	
128	Win	99–24–4 (1)	Kenny LaSalle	SD	10	Aug 5, 1940	Hickey Park, Millvale, Pennsylvania, US	
127	Win	98–24–4 (1)	Leonard Bennett	KO	4 (10)	Jul 22, 1940	Marigold Gardens Outdoor Arena, Chicago, Illinois, US	
126	Win	97–24–4 (1)	Ossie Harris	PTS	10	Jul 8, 1940	Hickey Park, Millvale, Pennsylvania, US	
125	Win	96–24–4 (1)	Johnny Rinaldi	KO	1 (10)	Jun 24, 1940	Hickey Park, Millvale, Pennsylvania, US	
124	Win	95–24–4 (1)	Ossie Harris	KO	3 (10)	May 21, 1940	Forbes Field, Pittsburgh, Pennsylvania, US	
123	Loss	94–24–4 (1)	Johnny Barbara	UD	10	May 7, 1940	Convention Hall, Philadelphia, Pennsylvania, US	
122	Win	94–23–4 (1)	Mansfield Driskell	PTS	10	May 3, 1940	Naval Armory, Detroit, Michigan, US	
121	Loss	93–23–4 (1)	Johnny Barbara	MD	10	Apr 8, 1940	Convention Hall, Philadelphia, Pennsylvania, US	
120	Win	93–22–4 (1)	Johnny Barbara	PTS	10	Mar 14, 1940	Coliseum, Chicago, Illinois, US	
119	Win	92–22–4 (1)	Saverio Turiello	KO	1 (10)	Mar 4, 1940	Convention Hall, Philadelphia, Pennsylvania, US	
118	Win	91–22–4 (1)	Remo Fernandez	TKO	7 (8)	Feb 16, 1940	Public Hall, Cleveland, Ohio, US	
117	Win	90–22–4 (1)	Mike Kaplan	SD	10	Jan 22, 1940	Convention Hall, Philadelphia, Pennsylvania, US	
116	Loss	89–22–4 (1)	Milt Aron	KO	8 (10)	Dec 27, 1939	Coliseum, Chicago, Illinois, US	
115	Win	89–21–4 (1)	Wicky Harkins	TKO	9 (10)	Dec 6, 1939	Convention Hall, Philadelphia, Pennsylvania, US	
114	Win	88–21–4 (1)	Billy Lancaster	TKO	7 (8)	Nov 18, 1939	Ridgewood Grove, New York City, New York, US	
113	Win	87–21–4 (1)	Milo Theodorescu	UD	10	Oct 30, 1939	Moose Temple, Pittsburgh, Pennsylvania, US	
112	Win	86–21–4 (1)	Kid Azteca	UD	10	Oct 24, 1939	Olympiad Arena, Houston, Texas, US	
111	Win	85–21–4 (1)	Ralph Gizzy	KO	2 (10)	Sep 21, 1939	Palisades Rink, McKeesport, Pennsylvania, US	
110	Win	84–21–4 (1)	Pete DeRuzza	TKO	6 (10)	Sep 5, 1939	Hickey Park, Millvale, Pennsylvania, US	
109	Loss	83–21–4 (1)	Charley Burley	UD	10	Jul 17, 1939	Forbes Field, Pittsburgh, Pennsylvania, US	
108	Win	83–20–4 (1)	Jackie Burke	UD	10	Jul 11, 1939	Municipal Auditorium, Saint Louis, Missouri, US	
107	Win	82–20–4 (1)	Kenny LaSalle	SD	10	Jun 5, 1939	Hickey Park, Millvale, Pennsylvania, US	
106	Win	81–20–4 (1)	Al Traino	PTS	10	May 16, 1939	Edgerton Park Arena, Rochester, New York, US	
105	Loss	80–20–4 (1)	Kenny LaSalle	PTS	10	May 9, 1939	Olympiad Arena, Houston, Texas, US	
104	Win	80–19–4 (1)	Tiger Kid Walker	KO	1 (10)	Apr 20, 1939	Municipal Auditorium, Saint Louis, Missouri, US	
103	Win	79–19–4 (1)	Bobby Britton	UD	10	Mar 29, 1939	Beach Arena, Miami Beach, Florida, US	
102	Win	78–19–4 (1)	Nick Pastore	TKO	9 (10)	Mar 20, 1939	Beach Arena, Miami Beach, Florida, US	
101	Win	77–19–4 (1)	Charlie Bell	KO	3 (10)	Feb 15, 1939	Memorial Hall, Columbus, Ohio, US	
100	Win	76–19–4 (1)	Eddie Booker	PTS	8	Feb 10, 1939	Madison Square Garden, New York City, New York, US	
99	Win	75–19–4 (1)	Jackie Burke	MD	10	Jan 20, 1939	Coliseum, Saint Louis, Missouri, US	
98	Draw	74–19–4 (1)	Howell King	NWS	10	Dec 26, 1938	Civic Auditorium, Toledo, Ohio, US	
97	Win	74–19–4	Vince Pimpinella	UD	10	Dec 8, 1938	Duquesne Gardens, Pittsburgh, Pennsylvania, US	
96	Win	73–19–4	Al Hamilton	KO	5 (10)	Nov 21, 1938	Columbus, Ohio, US	
95	Win	72–19–4	Frankie Blair	PTS	8	Nov 15, 1938	New York Coliseum, New York City, New York, US	
94	Win	71–19–4	Salvy Saban	PTS	10	Oct 27, 1938	Duquesne Gardens, Pittsburgh, Pennsylvania, US	
93	Win	70–19–4	Jay Macedon	TKO	5 (10)	Oct 10, 1938	Laurel Garden, Newark, New Jersey, US	
92	Win	69–19–4	Paul Cortlyn	KO	4 (10)	Oct 3, 1938	Laurel Garden, Newark, New Jersey, US	
91	Win	68–19–4	Bobby Pacho	PTS	10	Sep 13, 1938	Meadowbrook Bowl, Newark, New Jersey, US	
90	Win	67–19–4	Mickey Paul	KO	1 (8)	Aug 26, 1938	Long Beach Stadium, Long Beach, New York, US	
89	Win	66–19–4	Steve Kahley	TKO	3 (10)	Aug 22, 1938	Meadowbrook Bowl, Newark, New Jersey, US	
88	Win	65–19–4	Joe Pennino	PTS	8	Aug 12, 1938	Coney Island Velodrome, New York City, New York, US	
87	Win	64–19–4	Joe Lemieux	TKO	4 (10)	Aug 2, 1938	Meadowbrook Bowl, Newark, New Jersey, US	
86	Win	63–19–4	Phil Furr	TKO	3 (10)	Jul 12, 1938	Hickey Park, Millvale, Pennsylvania, US	
85	Win	62–19–4	Eddie Conley	KO	6 (10)	Jul 9, 1938	Walnut Beach Stadium, Milford, Connecticut, US	
84	Win	61–19–4	Ercole Buratti	KO	4 (10)	Jun 20, 1938	Hickey Park, Millvale, Pennsylvania, US	
83	Loss	60–19–4	Charley Burley	UD	10	Jun 13, 1938	Hickey Park, Millvale, Pennsylvania, US	
82	Win	60–18–4	Petey Mike	KO	1 (10)	May 20, 1938	Fort Hamilton Arena, New York City, New York, US	
81	Win	59–18–4	Remo Fernandez	PTS	10	Apr 12, 1938	Arena Gardens, Detroit, Michigan, US	
80	Win	58–18–4	Charley Burley	SD	10	Mar 21, 1938	Motor Square Garden, Pittsburgh, Pennsylvania, US	
79	Win	57–18–4	Tommy Bland	TKO	8 (10)	Mar 7, 1938	Motor Square Garden, Pittsburgh, Pennsylvania, US	
78	Win	56–18–4	Frankie Blair	PTS	10	Feb 14, 1938	Motor Square Garden, Pittsburgh, Pennsylvania, US	
77	Win	55–18–4	Harold Brown	PTS	10	Jan 7, 1938	Rainbo Arena, Chicago, Illinois, US	
76	Loss	54–18–4	Tommy Bland	MD	10	Dec 25, 1937	Motor Square Garden, Pittsburgh, Pennsylvania, US	
75	Win	54–17–4	Jimmy Reilly	KO	2 (10)	Nov 18, 1937	Palisades Rink, McKeesport, Pennsylvania, US	
74	Win	53–17–4	Frankie Portland	KO	2 (10)	Oct 27, 1937	Clarksburg, West Virginia, US	
73	Win	52–17–4	Tony Petroskey	PTS	10	May 21, 1937	Muskegon, Michigan, US	
72	Win	51–17–4	Chuck Woods	PTS	10	Apr 6, 1937	Arena Gardens, Detroit, Michigan, US	
71	Win	50–17–4	Bobby Pacho	SD	10	Mar 1, 1937	Motor Square Garden, Pittsburgh, Pennsylvania, US	
70	Win	49–17–4	Johnny Jadick	KO	6 (10)	Feb 11, 1937	Duquesne Gardens, Pittsburgh, Pennsylvania, US	
69	Loss	48–17–4	Billy Conn	SD	10	Dec 28, 1936	Duquesne Gardens, Pittsburgh, Pennsylvania, US	
68	Win	48–16–4	Harry Dublinsky	TKO	6 (10)	Dec 2, 1936	Motor Square Garden, Pittsburgh, Pennsylvania, US	
67	Win	47–16–4	Gaston LeCadre	PTS	10	Nov 9, 1936	Moose Lodge, Pittsburgh, Pennsylvania, US	
66	Win	46–16–4	Chuck Woods	KO	6 (10)	Oct 16, 1936	Municipal Auditorium, Saint Louis, Missouri, US	
65	Win	45–16–4	Johnny Durso	KO	2 (10), 2:08	Oct 5, 1936	Islam Grotto, Pittsburgh, Pennsylvania, US	
64	Win	44–16–4	Jackie McFarland	PTS	10	Sep 28, 1936	Auditorium, Canton, Ohio, US	
63	Loss	43–16–4	Cleto Locatelli	UD	10	Aug 12, 1936	Ebbets Field, New York City, New York, US	
62	Win	43–15–4	Laddie Tonielli	TKO	6 (10)	Jul 30, 1936	Forbes Field, Pittsburgh, Pennsylvania, US	
61	Win	42–15–4	Mickey Duris	PTS	12	Jul 22, 1936	Johnstown, Pennsylvania, US	
60	Win	41–15–4	Laddie Tonielli	TKO	4 (10)	Jul 6, 1936	Hickey Park, Millvale, Pennsylvania, US	
59	Win	40–15–4	Lou Jallos	TKO	3 (10)	Jul 2, 1936	Harding Stadium, Steubenville, Ohio, US	
58	Win	39–15–4	Al Manfredo	PTS	10	Jun 17, 1936	Municipal Auditorium, Saint Louis, Missouri, US	
57	Win	38–15–4	Tony Falco	TKO	8 (10)	Jun 9, 1936	Hickey Park, Millvale, Pennsylvania, US	
56	Win	37–15–4	Billy Celebron	KO	1 (10), 0:30	May 22, 1936	Municipal Auditorium, Saint Louis, Missouri, US	
55	Loss	36–15–4	'Young' Gene Buffalo	PTS	10	Apr 17, 1936	Waltz Dream Arena, Atlantic City, New Jersey, US	
54	Win	36–14–4	Joe Flocco	PTS	10	Apr 15, 1936	Madrid Palestra, Harrisburg, Pennsylvania, US	
53	Loss	35–14–4	Chuck Woods	PTS	10	Feb 24, 1936	Northside Arena, Pittsburgh, Pennsylvania, US	
52	Loss	35–13–4	Joey Ferrando	PTS	8	Jan 27, 1936	St. Nicholas Arena, New York City, New York, US	
51	Loss	35–12–4	Eddie Cool	SD	10	Jan 13, 1936	Northside Arena, Pittsburgh, Pennsylvania, US	
50	Loss	35–11–4	Billy Celebron	UD	10	Dec 16, 1935	Marigold Gardens, Chicago, Illinois, US	
49	Loss	35–10–4	George Salvadore	PTS	6	Oct 4, 1935	Madison Square Garden, New York City, New York, US	
48	Loss	35–9–4	Tony Herrera	SD	10	Sep 30, 1935	Northside Arena, Pittsburgh, Pennsylvania, US	
47	Loss	35–8–4	Joey Ferrando	PTS	10	Aug 6, 1935	Braddock Bowl, Jersey City, New Jersey, US	
46	Win	35–7–4	Mike Barto	PTS	10	Jul 29, 1935	Hickey Park, Millvale, Pennsylvania, US	
45	Win	34–7–4	Jackie McFarland	UD	10	Jul 16, 1935	Hickey Park, Millvale, Pennsylvania, US	
44	Loss	33–7–4	Lou Ambers	UD	10	Jul 1, 1935	Hickey Park, Millvale, Pennsylvania, US	
43	Win	33–6–4	Eddie Adams	RTD	7 (10)	May 21, 1935	Pajaro Gardens, Kent, Ohio, US	
42	Win	32–6–4	Sammy Chivas	TKO	3 (8)	May 6, 1935	Marigold Gardens, Chicago, Illinois, US	
41	Win	31–6–4	Freddie Chynoweth	PTS	8	Apr 29, 1935	Marigold Gardens, Chicago, Illinois, US	
40	Win	30–6–4	Marty Gornick	RTD	5 (10)	Apr 15, 1935	Kincaid's Arena, Steubenville, Ohio, US	
39	Win	29–6–4	Dominic Mancini	TKO	11 (12), 0:38	Apr 8, 1935	Moose Lodge, Pittsburgh, Pennsylvania, US	
38	Draw	28–6–4	Dominic Mancini	PTS	10	Apr 1, 1935	Moose Lodge, Pittsburgh, Pennsylvania, US	
37	Win	28–6–3	Glafiro 'K.O.' Castillo	UD	10	Mar 4, 1935	Valley Arena, Holyoke, Massachusetts, US	
36	Loss	27–6–3	Johnny Jadick	PTS	10	Feb 18, 1935	Auditorium, Washington, District of Columbia, US	
35	Loss	27–5–3	Jimmy Leto	UD	10	Feb 4, 1935	Valley Arena, Holyoke, Massachusetts, US	
34	Loss	27–4–3	Laddie Tonielli	KO	2 (8)	Oct 26, 1934	Coliseum, Chicago, Illinois, US	
33	Win	27–3–3	Harry Carlton	PTS	10	Sep 27, 1934	Northside Arena, Pittsburgh, Pennsylvania, US	
32	Win	26–3–3	'Young' Joe Firpo	PTS	10	Aug 18, 1934	Academy of Music, Conneaut Lake, Pennsylvania, US	
31	Win	25–3–3	Eddie Ran	SD	10	Jul 2, 1934	Hickey Park, Millvale, Pennsylvania, US	
30	Win	24–3–3	Luis Carranza	PTS	4	May 29, 1934	Olympic Auditorium, Los Angeles, California, US	
29	Draw	23–3–3	Phil Rios	PTS	6	May 8, 1934	Olympic Auditorium, Los Angeles, California, US	
28	Win	23–3–2	Phil Rios	PTS	6	Apr 30, 1934	Pico Arena, Pico, California, US	
27	Draw	22–3–2	Lloyd Smith	PTS	6	Mar 6, 1934	Olympic Auditorium, Los Angeles, California, US	
26	Win	22–3–1	Perfecto Lopez	PTS	6	Feb 6, 1934	Olympic Auditorium, Los Angeles, California, US	
25	Win	21–3–1	Baby Sal Sorio	TKO	2 (4)	Jan 23, 1934	Olympic Auditorium, Los Angeles, California, US	
24	Win	20–3–1	Rudy Ayon	PTS	4	Dec 27, 1933	Pico Arena, Pico, California, US	
23	Win	19–3–1	Vincent Martinez	PTS	4	Dec 15, 1933	Legion Stadium, Hollywood, California, US	
22	Draw	18–3–1	Homer Foster	PTS	4	Dec 4, 1933	Pico Arena, Pico, California, US	
21	Win	18–3	Don Miller	TKO	3 (4)	Nov 23, 1933	Pasadena Arena, Pasadena, California, US	
20	Win	17–3	Gus Vargas	KO	2 (4)	Nov 3, 1933	Dreamland Auditorium, San Francisco, California, US	
19	Win	16–3	Joe Pimentel	KO	4 (4)	Oct 12, 1933	Pasadena Arena, Pasadena, California, US	
18	Win	15–3	Joey Greb	PTS	6	Aug 7, 1933	Hickey Park, Millvale, Pennsylvania, US	
17	Win	14–3	Don Asto	TKO	3 (6)	Jul 10, 1933	Hickey Park, Millvale, Pennsylvania, US	
16	Win	13–3	Don Asto	UD	6	Jun 26, 1933	Hickey Park, Millvale, Pennsylvania, US	
15	Win	12–3	Patsy Hennigan	PTS	6	Apr 28, 1933	Northside Arena, Pittsburgh, Pennsylvania, US	
14	Win	11–3	Eddie Brannon	TKO	6 (6), 0:48	Apr 10, 1933	Motor Square Garden, Pittsburgh, Pennsylvania, US	
13	Win	10–3	Frank Carpenter	TKO	4 (6)	Mar 27, 1933	Motor Square Garden, Pittsburgh, Pennsylvania, US	
12	Win	9–3	Steve Senich	KO	2 (4)	Feb 8, 1933	Moose Temple, Pittsburgh, Pennsylvania, US	
11	Win	8–3	George Schlee	RTD	2 (6)	Jan 30, 1933	Motor Square Garden, Pittsburgh, Pennsylvania, US	
10	Win	7–3	Billy Cregan	PTS	4	Dec 13, 1932	Northside Arena, Pittsburgh, Pennsylvania, US	
9	Loss	6–3	Jerry Clements	SD	6	Nov 18, 1932	Northside Arena, Pittsburgh, Pennsylvania, US	
8	Win	6–2	Terry Waner	TKO	3 (6)	Oct 14, 1932	Northside Arena, Pittsburgh, Pennsylvania, US	
7	Win	5–2	Jim Dorsey	KO	4 (6)	Sep 26, 1932	Motor Square Garden, Pittsburgh, Pennsylvania, US	
6	Loss	4–2	Steve Senich	MD	6	Jun 22, 1932	Meyers Bowl, North Braddock, Pennsylvania, US	
5	Win	4–1	'Young' Lowstetter	UD	6	Jun 9, 1932	Hickey Park, Millvale, Pennsylvania, US	
4	Win	3–1	Elmer Kozak	TKO	4 (6)	Mar 4, 1932	Kapphan's Arena, Pittsburgh, Pennsylvania, US	
3	Win	2–1	Paddy Gilmore	KO	4 (6)	Jan 1, 1932	Motor Square Garden, Pittsburgh, Pennsylvania, US	
2	Loss	1–1	Steve Senich	PTS	6	Nov 16, 1931	Motor Square Garden, Pittsburgh, Pennsylvania, US	
1	Win	1–0	Al Rettinger	TKO	1 (6)	Oct 5, 1931	Motor Square Garden, Pittsburgh, Pennsylvania, US	

=== Unofficial record ===
233 fights	158 wins	65 losses
By knockout	81	4
By decision	76	61
By disqualification	1	0
Draws	10	

Record with the inclusion of newspaper decisions in the win/loss/draw column.

No.	Result	Record	Opponent	Type	Round	Date	Location	Notes
233	Win	158–65–10	Eddie Steele	UD	10	Jan 17, 1949	Municipal Auditorium, Augusta, Georgia, US	
232	Win	157–65–10	Al Reid	PTS	10	Jan 12, 1949	City Auditorium, Macon, Georgia, US	
231	Draw	156–65–10	Eddie Steele	PTS	10	Oct 28, 1948	City Auditorium, Macon, Georgia, US	
230	Loss	156–65–9	Kid Azteca	KO	5 (10)	Feb 1, 1947	Mexico City, Distrito Federal, Mexico	
229	Loss	156–64–9	Clyde Gordon	UD	9	Jan 8, 1947	Civic Center Arena, Miami, Florida, US	
228	Win	156–63–9	Bobby Britton	UD	10	Dec 10, 1946	Ellis Auditorium, Memphis, Tennessee, US	
227	Loss	155–63–9	Pete Mead	PTS	10	Dec 6, 1946	Civic Auditorium, Grand Rapids, Michigan, US	
226	Loss	155–62–9	Ralph Zannelli	PTS	10	Dec 2, 1946	Rhode Island Auditorium, Providence, Rhode Island, US	
225	Draw	155–61–9	Jimmy McGriff	PTS	10	Nov 18, 1946	Turner's Arena, Washington, D.C., US	
224	Loss	155–61–8	Al Mobley	PTS	8	Nov 12, 1946	Arena, Trenton, New Jersey, US	
223	Win	155–60–8	Russell Wilhite	TKO	5 (10)	Oct 29, 1946	Memphis, Tennessee, US	
222	Loss	154–60–8	Tommy Lemmon	SD	10	May 27, 1946	Auditorium, Milwaukee, Wisconsin, US	
221	Loss	154–59–8	California Jackie Wilson	UD	10	May 14, 1946	Olympic Auditorium, Los Angeles, California, US	
220	Win	154–58–8	Joey Martinez	RTD	8 (10)	May 1, 1946	Wichita, Kansas, US	
219	Loss	153–58–8	Howard Bleyhl	PTS	10	Apr 29, 1946	City Auditorium, Omaha, Nebraska, US	
218	Win	153–57–8	Don Lee	UD	10	Apr 18, 1946	Legion Stadium, Hollywood, California, US	
217	Win	152–57–8	Lincoln Stanley	PTS	10	Apr 12, 1946	Auditorium, Portland, Oregon, US	
216	Draw	151–57–8	Manuel Villa I	MD	10	Apr 5, 1946	Liberty Hall, El Paso, Texas, US	
215	Loss	151–57–7	Tony Elizondo	UD	10	Mar 26, 1946	Municipal Auditorium, San Antonio, Texas, US	
214	Win	151–56–7	Levi Southall	NWS	10	Mar 19, 1946	Memorial Hall, Kansas City, Missouri, US	
213	Loss	150–56–7	Aaron Perry	PTS	10	Feb 25, 1946	Uline Arena, Washington, D.C., US	
212	Loss	150–55–7	O'Neill Bell	UD	10	Feb 1, 1946	Olympia Stadium, Detroit, Michigan, US	
211	Loss	150–54–7	Al Priest	UD	10	Jan 15, 1946	Boston Garden, Boston, Massachusetts, US	
210	Loss	150–53–7	Cecil Hudson	UD	10	Dec 10, 1945	Madison Square Garden, New York City, New York, US	
209	Loss	150–52–7	Joe Curcio	PTS	10	Nov 13, 1945	Armory, Elizabeth, New Jersey, US	
208	Loss	150–51–7	Freddie Archer	UD	10	Nov 2, 1945	St. Nicholas Arena, New York City, New York, US	
207	Loss	150–50–7	Joe Reddick	SD	10	Oct 20, 1945	Ridgewood Grove, New York City, New York, US	
206	Win	150–49–7	Billy Deeg	PTS	10	Sep 18, 1945	Municipal Auditorium, Oklahoma City, Oklahoma, US	
205	Loss	149–49–7	Paul Altman	PTS	10	Sep 12, 1945	Coliseum, Houston, Texas, US	
204	Loss	149–48–7	Bill McDowell	PTS	10	Jul 16, 1945	Pelican Stadium, New Orleans, Louisiana, US	
203	Loss	149–47–7	Ossie Harris	SD	10	Jul 10, 1945	Hickey Park, Millvale, Pennsylvania, US	
202	Loss	149–46–7	Rueben Shank	SD	10	Jul 3, 1945	Forbes Field, Pittsburgh, Pennsylvania, US	
201	Loss	149–45–7	Harold Green	UD	10	Jun 22, 1945	Madison Square Garden, New York City, New York, US	
200	Win	149–44–7	Baby Zavala	KO	4 (10)	Jun 12, 1945	Brackenridge Park, San Antonio, Texas, US	
199	Win	148–44–7	Pat Saia	UD	10	May 8, 1945	City Auditorium, Beaumont, Texas, US	
198	Win	147–44–7	Kid Azteca	MD	10	May 7, 1945	Municipal Auditorium, San Antonio, Texas, US	
197	Win	146–44–7	Manuel Villa I	KO	8 (10)	Apr 3, 1945	Municipal Auditorium, San Antonio, Texas, US	
196	Win	145–44–7	Benny Evans	TKO	8 (10)	Mar 22, 1945	City Auditorium, Galveston, Texas, US	
195	Win	144–44–7	Bill McDowell	UD	10	Mar 6, 1945	City Auditorium, Galveston, Texas, US	
194	Win	143–44–7	Kid Estrada	KO	2 (6)	Feb 22, 1945	Camp Maxey, Texas, US	
193	Win	142–44–7	Billy Arnold	MD	8	Jan 5, 1945	Madison Square Garden, New York City, New York, US	
192	Win	141–44–7	Kid Azteca	MD	10	Dec 12, 1944	Municipal Auditorium, San Antonio, Texas, US	
191	Win	140–44–7	Manuel Villa I	KO	6 (10)	Nov 29, 1944	Sportatorium, Dallas, Texas, US	
190	Win	139–44–7	Chuck Hirst	KO	5 (10)	Nov 14, 1944	City Auditorium, Houston, Texas, US	
189	Win	138–44–7	Pat Saia	TKO	8 (10)	Oct 18, 1944	Sportatorium, Dallas, Texas, US	
188	Loss	137–44–7	Tommy Roman	UD	10	Oct 16, 1944	Municipal Auditorium, Shreveport, Louisiana, US	
187	Win	137–43–7	Artie Dorrell	TKO	7 (10)	Sep 26, 1944	City Auditorium, Galveston, Texas, US	
186	Win	136–43–7	Felix Morales	KO	2 (10)	Sep 12, 1944	Municipal Auditorium, San Antonio, Texas, US	
185	Win	135–43–7	Pete DeRuzza	TKO	8 (10)	Aug 1, 1944	Houston, Texas, US	
184	Loss	134–43–7	Tommy Bell	SD	10	Jun 26, 1944	Forbes Field, Pittsburgh, Pennsylvania, US	
183	Loss	134–42–7	Freddie Archer	PTS	10	Mar 29, 1944	Armory, Elizabeth, New Jersey, US	
182	Win	134–41–7	Harry Teaney	PTS	10	Mar 24, 1944	Auditorium, Milwaukee, Wisconsin, US	
181	Loss	133–41–7	Jake LaMotta	UD	10	Jan 14, 1944	Olympia Stadium, Detroit, Michigan, US	
180	Win	133–40–7	Ossie Harris	KO	10 (10)	Jan 3, 1944	Duquesne Gardens, Pittsburgh, Pennsylvania, US	
179	Loss	132–40–7	Ralph Zannelli	UD	10	Dec 20, 1943	Boston Garden, Boston, Massachusetts, US	
178	Loss	132–39–7	Jake LaMotta	SD	10	Nov 12, 1943	Madison Square Garden, New York City, New York, US	
177	Win	132–38–7	Bobby Richardson	UD	10	Oct 29, 1943	Chicago Stadium, Chicago, Illinois, US	
176	Loss	131–38–7	Jose Basora	UD	10	Oct 15, 1943	Olympia Stadium, Detroit, Michigan, US	
175	Win	131–37–7	Vinnie Vines	KO	1 (10)	Sep 10, 1943	Madison Square Garden, New York City, New York, US	
174	Loss	130–37–7	Bob Montgomery	UD	10	Aug 23, 1943	Shibe Park, Philadelphia, Pennsylvania, US	
173	Win	130–36–7	Young Kid McCoy	TKO	4 (10)	Aug 9, 1943	Forbes Field, Pittsburgh, Pennsylvania, US	
172	Win	129–36–7	Jake LaMotta	SD	15	Jul 12, 1943	Forbes Field, Pittsburgh, Pennsylvania, US	
171	Loss	128–36–7	Jake LaMotta	SD	10	Jun 10, 1943	Forbes Field, Pittsburgh, Pennsylvania, US	
170	Win	128–35–7	Johnny Roszina	TKO	8 (10)	Apr 30, 1943	Auditorium, Milwaukee, Wisconsin, US	
169	Loss	127–35–7	Beau Jack	UD	12	Mar 5, 1943	Madison Square Garden, New York City, New York, US	
168	Win	127–34–7	Mayon Padlo	PTS	10	Feb 16, 1943	Duquesne Gardens, Pittsburgh, Pennsylvania, US	
167	Loss	126–34–7	Beau Jack	UD	10	Feb 5, 1943	Madison Square Garden, New York City, New York, US	
166	Win	126–33–7	Carmen Notch	UD	10	Dec 15, 1942	Duquesne Gardens, Pittsburgh, Pennsylvania, US	
165	Loss	125–33–7	Sheik Rangel	PTS	10	Nov 16, 1942	Civic Auditorium, San Francisco, California, US	
164	Loss	125–32–7	Henry Armstrong	UD	10	Oct 26, 1942	Civic Auditorium, San Francisco, California, US	
163	Win	125–31–7	Tito Taylor	PTS	10	Oct 13, 1942	Auditorium, Milwaukee, Wisconsin, US	
162	Win	124–31–7	Johnny Walker	UD	10	Sep 21, 1942	Convention Hall, Philadelphia, Pennsylvania, US	
161	Win	123–31–7	Freddie Cochrane	UD	10	Sep 10, 1942	Madison Square Garden, New York City, New York, US	
160	Win	122–31–7	Garvey Young	TKO	6 (10)	Aug 13, 1942	Madison Square Garden, New York City, New York, US	
159	Win	121–31–7	Norman Rubio	TKO	9 (10)	Jul 27, 1942	Forbes Field, Pittsburgh, Pennsylvania, US	
158	Loss	120–31–7	Norman Rubio	PTS	10	Jun 29, 1942	Meadowbrook Bowl, Newark, New Jersey, US	
157	Win	120–30–7	Bobby Britton	TKO	4 (10)	Jun 22, 1942	Kingston Armory, Kingston, Pennsylvania, US	
156	Win	119–30–7	Rueben Shank	PTS	10	Jun 4, 1942	Armory, Minneapolis, Minnesota, US	
155	Win	118–30–7	Lew Jenkins	TKO	10 (10)	May 25, 1942	Forbes Field, Pittsburgh, Pennsylvania, US	
154	Loss	117–30–7	Reuben Shank	UD	10	Apr 23, 1942	Armory, Minneapolis, Minnesota, US	
153	Win	117–29–7	Maxie Berger	PTS	10	Apr 13, 1942	Duquesne Gardens, Pittsburgh, Pennsylvania, US	
152	Win	116–29–7	Bill McDowell	TKO	6 (10)	Mar 30, 1942	Laurel Garden, Newark, New Jersey, US	
151	Win	115–29–7	Izzy Jannazzo	RTD	4 (10)	Mar 9, 1942	Duquesne Gardens, Pittsburgh, Pennsylvania, US	
150	Loss	114–29–7	Tony Motisi	UD	10	Feb 27, 1942	Coliseum, Chicago, Illinois, US	
149	Win	114–28–7	Raul Carabantes	PTS	10	Feb 9, 1942	Duquesne Gardens, Pittsburgh, Pennsylvania, US	
148	Loss	113–28–7	Sugar Ray Robinson	TKO	10 (12)	Jan 16, 1942	Madison Square Garden, New York City, New York, US	
147	Draw	113–27–7	Young Kid McCoy	PTS	10	Dec 12, 1941	Madison Square Garden, New York City, New York, US	
146	Win	113–27–6	Harry Weekly	TKO	9 (10)	Dec 1, 1941	Uline Arena, Washington, D.C., US	
145	Win	112–27–6	Phil Furr	UD	10	Nov 26, 1941	Uline Arena, Washington, D.C., US	
144	Loss	111–27–6	Sugar Ray Robinson	UD	10	Oct 31, 1941	Madison Square Garden, New York City, New York, US	
143	Win	111–26–6	Milt Aron	KO	5 (10)	Sep 15, 1941	Forbes Field, Pittsburgh, Pennsylvania, US	
142	Loss	110–26–6	Freddie Cochrane	PTS	15	Jul 29, 1941	Ruppert Stadium, Newark, New Jersey, US	Lost NYSAC, NBA, and The Ring welterweight titles
141	Win	110–25–6	Johnny Barbara	UD	12	Jul 14, 1941	Gardens, Philadelphia, Pennsylvania, US	
140	Win	109–25–6	Al Davis	TKO	10 (12)	Jul 2, 1941	Polo Grounds, New York City, New York, US	
139	Win	108–25–6	Tony Marteliano	UD	10	May 2, 1941	New York Coliseum, New York City, New York, US	
138	Loss	107–25–6	Mike Kaplan	UD	10	Apr 18, 1941	Boston Garden, Boston, Massachusetts, US	
137	Win	107–24–6	Dick Demaray	TKO	5 (12)	Apr 4, 1941	Armory, Minneapolis, Minnesota, US	
136	Win	106–24–6	Felix Garcia	KO	2 (10)	Mar 20, 1941	Coliseum, Baltimore, Maryland, US	
135	Win	105–24–6	Saverio Turiello	PTS	10	Mar 17, 1941	Duquesne Gardens, Pittsburgh, Pennsylvania, US	
134	Win	104–24–6	Henry Armstrong	TKO	12 (15), 0:52	Jan 17, 1941	Madison Square Garden, New York City, New York, US	Retained NYSAC, NBA, and The Ring welterweight titles
133	Draw	103–24–6	Lew Jenkins	PTS	10	Dec 20, 1940	Madison Square Garden, New York City, New York, US	
132	Win	103–24–5	Ronnie Beaudin	TKO	3 (10)	Nov 26, 1940	Memorial Auditorium, Buffalo, New York, US	
131	Win	102–24–5	Al Davis	DQ	2 (10)	Nov 15, 1940	Madison Square Garden, New York City, New York, US	
130	Win	101–24–5	Henry Armstrong	UD	15	Oct 4, 1940	Madison Square Garden, New York City, New York, US	Won NYSAC, NBA, and The Ring welterweight titles
129	Win	100–24–5	Sammy Angott	UD	10	Aug 29, 1940	Forbes Field, Pittsburgh, Pennsylvania, US	
128	Win	99–24–5	Kenny LaSalle	SD	10	Aug 5, 1940	Hickey Park, Millvale, Pennsylvania, US	
127	Win	98–24–5	Leonard Bennett	KO	4 (10)	Jul 22, 1940	Marigold Gardens Outdoor Arena, Chicago, Illinois, US	
126	Win	97–24–5	Ossie Harris	PTS	10	Jul 8, 1940	Hickey Park, Millvale, Pennsylvania, US	
125	Win	96–24–5	Johnny Rinaldi	KO	1 (10)	Jun 24, 1940	Hickey Park, Millvale, Pennsylvania, US	
124	Win	95–24–5	Ossie Harris	KO	3 (10)	May 21, 1940	Forbes Field, Pittsburgh, Pennsylvania, US	
123	Loss	94–24–5	Johnny Barbara	UD	10	May 7, 1940	Convention Hall, Philadelphia, Pennsylvania, US	
122	Win	94–23–5	Mansfield Driskell	PTS	10	May 3, 1940	Naval Armory, Detroit, Michigan, US	
121	Loss	93–23–5	Johnny Barbara	MD	10	Apr 8, 1940	Convention Hall, Philadelphia, Pennsylvania, US	
120	Win	93–22–5	Johnny Barbara	PTS	10	Mar 14, 1940	Coliseum, Chicago, Illinois, US	
119	Win	92–22–5	Saverio Turiello	KO	1 (10)	Mar 4, 1940	Convention Hall, Philadelphia, Pennsylvania, US	
118	Win	91–22–5	Remo Fernandez	TKO	7 (8)	Feb 16, 1940	Public Hall, Cleveland, Ohio, US	
117	Win	90–22–5	Mike Kaplan	SD	10	Jan 22, 1940	Convention Hall, Philadelphia, Pennsylvania, US	
116	Loss	89–22–5	Milt Aron	KO	8 (10)	Dec 27, 1939	Coliseum, Chicago, Illinois, US	
115	Win	89–21–5	Wicky Harkins	TKO	9 (10)	Dec 6, 1939	Convention Hall, Philadelphia, Pennsylvania, US	
114	Win	88–21–5	Billy Lancaster	TKO	7 (8)	Nov 18, 1939	Ridgewood Grove, New York City, New York, US	
113	Win	87–21–5	Milo Theodorescu	UD	10	Oct 30, 1939	Moose Temple, Pittsburgh, Pennsylvania, US	
112	Win	86–21–5	Kid Azteca	UD	10	Oct 24, 1939	Olympiad Arena, Houston, Texas, US	
111	Win	85–21–5	Ralph Gizzy	KO	2 (10)	Sep 21, 1939	Palisades Rink, McKeesport, Pennsylvania, US	
110	Win	84–21–5	Pete DeRuzza	TKO	6 (10)	Sep 5, 1939	Hickey Park, Millvale, Pennsylvania, US	
109	Loss	83–21–5	Charley Burley	UD	10	Jul 17, 1939	Forbes Field, Pittsburgh, Pennsylvania, US	
108	Win	83–20–5	Jackie Burke	UD	10	Jul 11, 1939	Municipal Auditorium, Saint Louis, Missouri, US	
107	Win	82–20–5	Kenny LaSalle	SD	10	Jun 5, 1939	Hickey Park, Millvale, Pennsylvania, US	
106	Win	81–20–5	Al Traino	PTS	10	May 16, 1939	Edgerton Park Arena, Rochester, New York, US	
105	Loss	80–20–5	Kenny LaSalle	PTS	10	May 9, 1939	Olympiad Arena, Houston, Texas, US	
104	Win	80–19–5	Tiger Kid Walker	KO	1 (10)	Apr 20, 1939	Municipal Auditorium, Saint Louis, Missouri, US	
103	Win	79–19–5	Bobby Britton	UD	10	Mar 29, 1939	Beach Arena, Miami Beach, Florida, US	
102	Win	78–19–5	Nick Pastore	TKO	9 (10)	Mar 20, 1939	Beach Arena, Miami Beach, Florida, US	
101	Win	77–19–5	Charlie Bell	KO	3 (10)	Feb 15, 1939	Memorial Hall, Columbus, Ohio, US	
100	Win	76–19–5	Eddie Booker	PTS	8	Feb 10, 1939	Madison Square Garden, New York City, New York, US	
99	Win	75–19–5	Jackie Burke	MD	10	Jan 20, 1939	Coliseum, Saint Louis, Missouri, US	
98	Draw	74–19–5	Howell King	NWS	10	Dec 26, 1938	Civic Auditorium, Toledo, Ohio, US	
97	Win	74–19–4	Vince Pimpinella	UD	10	Dec 8, 1938	Duquesne Gardens, Pittsburgh, Pennsylvania, US	
96	Win	73–19–4	Al Hamilton	KO	5 (10)	Nov 21, 1938	Columbus, Ohio, US	
95	Win	72–19–4	Frankie Blair	PTS	8	Nov 15, 1938	New York Coliseum, New York City, New York, US	
94	Win	71–19–4	Salvy Saban	PTS	10	Oct 27, 1938	Duquesne Gardens, Pittsburgh, Pennsylvania, US	
93	Win	70–19–4	Jay Macedon	TKO	5 (10)	Oct 10, 1938	Laurel Garden, Newark, New Jersey, US	
92	Win	69–19–4	Paul Cortlyn	KO	4 (10)	Oct 3, 1938	Laurel Garden, Newark, New Jersey, US	
91	Win	68–19–4	Bobby Pacho	PTS	10	Sep 13, 1938	Meadowbrook Bowl, Newark, New Jersey, US	
90	Win	67–19–4	Mickey Paul	KO	1 (8)	Aug 26, 1938	Long Beach Stadium, Long Beach, New York, US	
89	Win	66–19–4	Steve Kahley	TKO	3 (10)	Aug 22, 1938	Meadowbrook Bowl, Newark, New Jersey, US	
88	Win	65–19–4	Joe Pennino	PTS	8	Aug 12, 1938	Coney Island Velodrome, New York City, New York, US	
87	Win	64–19–4	Joe Lemieux	TKO	4 (10)	Aug 2, 1938	Meadowbrook Bowl, Newark, New Jersey, US	
86	Win	63–19–4	Phil Furr	TKO	3 (10)	Jul 12, 1938	Hickey Park, Millvale, Pennsylvania, US	
85	Win	62–19–4	Eddie Conley	KO	6 (10)	Jul 9, 1938	Walnut Beach Stadium, Milford, Connecticut, US	
84	Win	61–19–4	Ercole Buratti	KO	4 (10)	Jun 20, 1938	Hickey Park, Millvale, Pennsylvania, US	
83	Loss	60–19–4	Charley Burley	UD	10	Jun 13, 1938	Hickey Park, Millvale, Pennsylvania, US	
82	Win	60–18–4	Petey Mike	KO	1 (10)	May 20, 1938	Fort Hamilton Arena, New York City, New York, US	
81	Win	59–18–4	Remo Fernandez	PTS	10	Apr 12, 1938	Arena Gardens, Detroit, Michigan, US	
80	Win	58–18–4	Charley Burley	SD	10	Mar 21, 1938	Motor Square Garden, Pittsburgh, Pennsylvania, US	
79	Win	57–18–4	Tommy Bland	TKO	8 (10)	Mar 7, 1938	Motor Square Garden, Pittsburgh, Pennsylvania, US	
78	Win	56–18–4	Frankie Blair	PTS	10	Feb 14, 1938	Motor Square Garden, Pittsburgh, Pennsylvania, US	
77	Win	55–18–4	Harold Brown	PTS	10	Jan 7, 1938	Rainbo Arena, Chicago, Illinois, US	
76	Loss	54–18–4	Tommy Bland	MD	10	Dec 25, 1937	Motor Square Garden, Pittsburgh, Pennsylvania, US	
75	Win	54–17–4	Jimmy Reilly	KO	2 (10)	Nov 18, 1937	Palisades Rink, McKeesport, Pennsylvania, US	
74	Win	53–17–4	Frankie Portland	KO	2 (10)	Oct 27, 1937	Clarksburg, West Virginia, US	
73	Win	52–17–4	Tony Petroskey	PTS	10	May 21, 1937	Muskegon, Michigan, US	
72	Win	51–17–4	Chuck Woods	PTS	10	Apr 6, 1937	Arena Gardens, Detroit, Michigan, US	
71	Win	50–17–4	Bobby Pacho	SD	10	Mar 1, 1937	Motor Square Garden, Pittsburgh, Pennsylvania, US	
70	Win	49–17–4	Johnny Jadick	KO	6 (10)	Feb 11, 1937	Duquesne Gardens, Pittsburgh, Pennsylvania, US	
69	Loss	48–17–4	Billy Conn	SD	10	Dec 28, 1936	Duquesne Gardens, Pittsburgh, Pennsylvania, US	
68	Win	48–16–4	Harry Dublinsky	TKO	6 (10)	Dec 2, 1936	Motor Square Garden, Pittsburgh, Pennsylvania, US	
67	Win	47–16–4	Gaston LeCadre	PTS	10	Nov 9, 1936	Moose Lodge, Pittsburgh, Pennsylvania, US	
66	Win	46–16–4	Chuck Woods	KO	6 (10)	Oct 16, 1936	Municipal Auditorium, Saint Louis, Missouri, US	
65	Win	45–16–4	Johnny Durso	KO	2 (10), 2:08	Oct 5, 1936	Islam Grotto, Pittsburgh, Pennsylvania, US	
64	Win	44–16–4	Jackie McFarland	PTS	10	Sep 28, 1936	Auditorium, Canton, Ohio, US	
63	Loss	43–16–4	Cleto Locatelli	UD	10	Aug 12, 1936	Ebbets Field, New York City, New York, US	
62	Win	43–15–4	Laddie Tonielli	TKO	6 (10)	Jul 30, 1936	Forbes Field, Pittsburgh, Pennsylvania, US	
61	Win	42–15–4	Mickey Duris	PTS	12	Jul 22, 1936	Johnstown, Pennsylvania, US	
60	Win	41–15–4	Laddie Tonielli	TKO	4 (10)	Jul 6, 1936	Hickey Park, Millvale, Pennsylvania, US	
59	Win	40–15–4	Lou Jallos	TKO	3 (10)	Jul 2, 1936	Harding Stadium, Steubenville, Ohio, US	
58	Win	39–15–4	Al Manfredo	PTS	10	Jun 17, 1936	Municipal Auditorium, Saint Louis, Missouri, US	
57	Win	38–15–4	Tony Falco	TKO	8 (10)	Jun 9, 1936	Hickey Park, Millvale, Pennsylvania, US	
56	Win	37–15–4	Billy Celebron	KO	1 (10), 0:30	May 22, 1936	Municipal Auditorium, Saint Louis, Missouri, US	
55	Loss	36–15–4	'Young' Gene Buffalo	PTS	10	Apr 17, 1936	Waltz Dream Arena, Atlantic City, New Jersey, US	
54	Win	36–14–4	Joe Flocco	PTS	10	Apr 15, 1936	Madrid Palestra, Harrisburg, Pennsylvania, US	
53	Loss	35–14–4	Chuck Woods	PTS	10	Feb 24, 1936	Northside Arena, Pittsburgh, Pennsylvania, US	
52	Loss	35–13–4	Joey Ferrando	PTS	8	Jan 27, 1936	St. Nicholas Arena, New York City, New York, US	
51	Loss	35–12–4	Eddie Cool	SD	10	Jan 13, 1936	Northside Arena, Pittsburgh, Pennsylvania, US	
50	Loss	35–11–4	Billy Celebron	UD	10	Dec 16, 1935	Marigold Gardens, Chicago, Illinois, US	
49	Loss	35–10–4	George Salvadore	PTS	6	Oct 4, 1935	Madison Square Garden, New York City, New York, US	
48	Loss	35–9–4	Tony Herrera	SD	10	Sep 30, 1935	Northside Arena, Pittsburgh, Pennsylvania, US	
47	Loss	35–8–4	Joey Ferrando	PTS	10	Aug 6, 1935	Braddock Bowl, Jersey City, New Jersey, US	
46	Win	35–7–4	Mike Barto	PTS	10	Jul 29, 1935	Hickey Park, Millvale, Pennsylvania, US	
45	Win	34–7–4	Jackie McFarland	UD	10	Jul 16, 1935	Hickey Park, Millvale, Pennsylvania, US	
44	Loss	33–7–4	Lou Ambers	UD	10	Jul 1, 1935	Hickey Park, Millvale, Pennsylvania, US	
43	Win	33–6–4	Eddie Adams	RTD	7 (10)	May 21, 1935	Pajaro Gardens, Kent, Ohio, US	
42	Win	32–6–4	Sammy Chivas	TKO	3 (8)	May 6, 1935	Marigold Gardens, Chicago, Illinois, US	
41	Win	31–6–4	Freddie Chynoweth	PTS	8	Apr 29, 1935	Marigold Gardens, Chicago, Illinois, US	
40	Win	30–6–4	Marty Gornick	RTD	5 (10)	Apr 15, 1935	Kincaid's Arena, Steubenville, Ohio, US	
39	Win	29–6–4	Dominic Mancini	TKO	11 (12), 0:38	Apr 8, 1935	Moose Lodge, Pittsburgh, Pennsylvania, US	
38	Draw	28–6–4	Dominic Mancini	PTS	10	Apr 1, 1935	Moose Lodge, Pittsburgh, Pennsylvania, US	
37	Win	28–6–3	Glafiro 'K.O.' Castillo	UD	10	Mar 4, 1935	Valley Arena, Holyoke, Massachusetts, US	
36	Loss	27–6–3	Johnny Jadick	PTS	10	Feb 18, 1935	Auditorium, Washington, District of Columbia, US	
35	Loss	27–5–3	Jimmy Leto	UD	10	Feb 4, 1935	Valley Arena, Holyoke, Massachusetts, US	
34	Loss	27–4–3	Laddie Tonielli	KO	2 (8)	Oct 26, 1934	Coliseum, Chicago, Illinois, US	
33	Win	27–3–3	Harry Carlton	PTS	10	Sep 27, 1934	Northside Arena, Pittsburgh, Pennsylvania, US	
32	Win	26–3–3	'Young' Joe Firpo	PTS	10	Aug 18, 1934	Academy of Music, Conneaut Lake, Pennsylvania, US	
31	Win	25–3–3	Eddie Ran	SD	10	Jul 2, 1934	Hickey Park, Millvale, Pennsylvania, US	
30	Win	24–3–3	Luis Carranza	PTS	4	May 29, 1934	Olympic Auditorium, Los Angeles, California, US	
29	Draw	23–3–3	Phil Rios	PTS	6	May 8, 1934	Olympic Auditorium, Los Angeles, California, US	
28	Win	23–3–2	Phil Rios	PTS	6	Apr 30, 1934	Pico Arena, Pico, California, US	
27	Draw	22–3–2	Lloyd Smith	PTS	6	Mar 6, 1934	Olympic Auditorium, Los Angeles, California, US	
26	Win	22–3–1	Perfecto Lopez	PTS	6	Feb 6, 1934	Olympic Auditorium, Los Angeles, California, US	
25	Win	21–3–1	Baby Sal Sorio	TKO	2 (4)	Jan 23, 1934	Olympic Auditorium, Los Angeles, California, US	
24	Win	20–3–1	Rudy Ayon	PTS	4	Dec 27, 1933	Pico Arena, Pico, California, US	
23	Win	19–3–1	Vincent Martinez	PTS	4	Dec 15, 1933	Legion Stadium, Hollywood, California, US	
22	Draw	18–3–1	Homer Foster	PTS	4	Dec 4, 1933	Pico Arena, Pico, California, US	
21	Win	18–3	Don Miller	TKO	3 (4)	Nov 23, 1933	Pasadena Arena, Pasadena, California, US	
20	Win	17–3	Gus Vargas	KO	2 (4)	Nov 3, 1933	Dreamland Auditorium, San Francisco, California, US	
19	Win	16–3	Joe Pimentel	KO	4 (4)	Oct 12, 1933	Pasadena Arena, Pasadena, California, US	
18	Win	15–3	Joey Greb	PTS	6	Aug 7, 1933	Hickey Park, Millvale, Pennsylvania, US	
17	Win	14–3	Don Asto	TKO	3 (6)	Jul 10, 1933	Hickey Park, Millvale, Pennsylvania, US	
16	Win	13–3	Don Asto	UD	6	Jun 26, 1933	Hickey Park, Millvale, Pennsylvania, US	
15	Win	12–3	Patsy Hennigan	PTS	6	Apr 28, 1933	Northside Arena, Pittsburgh, Pennsylvania, US	
14	Win	11–3	Eddie Brannon	TKO	6 (6), 0:48	Apr 10, 1933	Motor Square Garden, Pittsburgh, Pennsylvania, US	
13	Win	10–3	Frank Carpenter	TKO	4 (6)	Mar 27, 1933	Motor Square Garden, Pittsburgh, Pennsylvania, US	
12	Win	9–3	Steve Senich	KO	2 (4)	Feb 8, 1933	Moose Temple, Pittsburgh, Pennsylvania, US	
11	Win	8–3	George Schlee	RTD	2 (6)	Jan 30, 1933	Motor Square Garden, Pittsburgh, Pennsylvania, US	
10	Win	7–3	Billy Cregan	PTS	4	Dec 13, 1932	Northside Arena, Pittsburgh, Pennsylvania, US	
9	Loss	6–3	Jerry Clements	SD	6	Nov 18, 1932	Northside Arena, Pittsburgh, Pennsylvania, US	
8	Win	6–2	Terry Waner	TKO	3 (6)	Oct 14, 1932	Northside Arena, Pittsburgh, Pennsylvania, US	
7	Win	5–2	Jim Dorsey	KO	4 (6)	Sep 26, 1932	Motor Square Garden, Pittsburgh, Pennsylvania, US	
6	Loss	4–2	Steve Senich	MD	6	Jun 22, 1932	Meyers Bowl, North Braddock, Pennsylvania, US	
5	Win	4–1	'Young' Lowstetter	UD	6	Jun 9, 1932	Hickey Park, Millvale, Pennsylvania, US	
4	Win	3–1	Elmer Kozak	TKO	4 (6)	Mar 4, 1932	Kapphan's Arena, Pittsburgh, Pennsylvania, US	
3	Win	2–1	Paddy Gilmore	KO	4 (6)	Jan 1, 1932	Motor Square Garden, Pittsburgh, Pennsylvania, US	
2	Loss	1–1	Steve Senich	PTS	6	Nov 16, 1931	Motor Square Garden, Pittsburgh, Pennsylvania, US	
1	Win	1–0	Al Rettinger	TKO	1 (6)	Oct 5, 1931	Motor Square Garden, Pittsburgh, Pennsylvania, US	

== Titles in boxing ==
=== Major world titles ===
- NYSAC welterweight champion (147 lbs)
- NBA (WBA) welterweight champion (147 lbs)

=== The Ring magazine titles ===
- The Ring welterweight champion (147 lbs)

=== Undisputed titles ===
- Undisputed welterweight champion

== See also ==
- List of welterweight boxing champions

== Bibliography ==
- Timpav, CHAMP - Fritzie Zivic - The life and time of the Croat Comet.

Achievements
Preceded by Henry Armstrong	World Welterweight Champion; October 4, 1940 – July 29, 1941	Succeeded by Freddie "Red" Cochrane

Sporting positions
World boxing titles
Preceded by Henry Armstrong	NYSAC welterweight champion October 4, 1940 – July 29, 1941	Succeeded by Freddie Cochrane
Preceded by Henry Armstrong	NBA welterweight champion October 4, 1940 – July 29, 1941	Succeeded by Freddie Cochrane
Preceded by Henry Armstrong	The Ring welterweight champion October 4, 1940 – July 29, 1941	Succeeded by Freddie Cochrane
Preceded by Henry Armstrong	Undisputed welterweight champion October 4, 1940 – July 29, 1941	Succeeded by Freddie Cochrane
