= Al Davis (boxer) =

American boxer (1920–1945)

Personal information
- Nickname: Bummy
- Born: Albert Abraham Davidoff; January 26, 1920 Brooklyn, New York, US
- Died: November 21, 1945 (aged 25) Brooklyn, New York, US
- Height: 5 ft 5 in (1.65 m)
- Weight: Welterweight; Lightweight

Boxing career
- Reach: 5 ft 7 in (1.70 m)
- Stance: Orthodox; Converted Southpaw

Boxing record
- Total fights: 79
- Wins: 65
- Win by KO: 46
- Losses: 10
- Draws: 4

Al "Bummy" Davis (January 26, 1920 – November 21, 1945), born Albert Abraham Davidoff, was an American lightweight and welterweight boxer who fought from 1937 to 1945. He was a serious contender, and a world ranked boxer in both weight classes.

== Early life ==
Davis grew up in the rough and tough, then-predominantly Jewish Brownsville section of Brooklyn. His father ran a produce pushcart and later owned a candy store during the 1920s, Prohibition days. Davis' job, as a young boy of seven, was to keep lookout for the police and give the alert to his father to hide bottles of whiskey being sold on the sly.

Davis developed into a young man and became known in a neighborhood that was home to Murder, Inc. His two brothers were affiliated with the gang. He concentrated on his boxing.

His mother called him "Vroomeleh," an affectionate diminutive of his Hebrew name, Avrum (Hebrew for his middle name, Abraham), and he was known to friends and family in his neighborhood as "Vroomy." When Al was a teenager, a boxing promoter convinced him to change his nickname to "Bummy;" the promoter felt that it sounded tougher and would draw a larger crowd. Davis originally objected to his boxing name.

Davis began boxing at Willie and Charlie Beecher's gym in Brownsville around 1933. At age thirteen, he came under the tutelage of a Jewish trainer, Froike (Frankie) Kane, a former lightweight. At barely fifteen, a year under age, Davis had his first amateur bout under the name Giovanni Pasconi. With his left hook, he knocked out a number of his first opponents and won scores of watches, the only compensation allowed amateur boxers. He pawned or sold most of them to his promoter for cash.

== Boxing career ==
Davis was a rough slugger with one of the most powerful left hooks in boxing history. He was managed by Lew Burston and Johnny Attel. His record was 66 wins, with 47 KOs, 10 losses and 4 draws, and he was named to Ring Magazine's list of "100 Greatest Punchers of All Time". He fought his first thirty-five fights out of Beecher's gym, winning thirty-three, but drawing two with Jack Sharkey, Jr., a tough opponent.

In an early career highlight, Davis met Bernie Friedkin on July 22, 1938, another Jewish boxer from Brooklyn who had trained at Willie and Charlie Beecher's gym in Brownsville. Davis was only eighteen so the bout could not exceed six rounds according to New York regulations, yet it was featured as the main event and drew a crowd of around 4,000 at Madison Square Garden. The more experienced Friedkin was a 6-5 favorite, but Davis pounded him with his signature left hooks in the first round. Friedkin, skilled in defense, recovered enough to win the second with good blocking, but lost the third on a foul. Following wicked lefts to the body in the early fourth, Davis went to the head and Friedkin slumped to the canvas after a left to the jaw. He tried to get up at the count of eight, but slumped again, and the referee stopped the bout 1:09 into the fourth.

=== Wins over Tony Canzoneri, Tippy Larkin, 1939 ===
He made a name for himself when he scored a three-round technical knockout over the great, but aging former lightweight champion Tony Canzoneri on November 1, 1939, at Madison Square Garden. Canzoneri, a former dual weight class champion, had never before been the victim of a knockout, though he was eleven years older than Davis at the time of the fight. Davis landed two solid blows to the chin of Canzoneri at the end of the second, and by the third his left had put Canzoneri down for a count of four, and then for a count of seven before the referee called the fight. Canzoneri's popularity did little to help Davis earn an audience among the many fight fans who adored and respected Canzoneri as one of the all time greats. The crowd booed him after his victory over the popular ex-champion.

He followed up that victory with a five-round KO over Tippy Larkin on December 15, 1939. Larkin had a wide lead in points coming into the fourth, before Davis found his mark in the fifth. In that round, Davis's left to the midriff ended the bout, but it was preceded by two heavy lefts to the ribs, and a right cross to the jaw, which rocked Larkin back on his heels. With a fighter of Larkin's skill, Davis had fallen behind when the fighting required a cautious and measured defense, and this would be a flaw in Davis's technique against top rated boxers.

=== Losses to Lou Amber, and Fritzie Zivic, 1940 ===
The next year proved a poor one for Davis. First, he lost a unanimous decision before 20,586 Madison Square Garden fans, to lightweight king Lou Ambers who took all but the second and fourth rounds in a non-title match on February 23, 1940. Ambers weathered the lefts of Davis to his body and chin, and countered effectively with blows of his own in the first five rounds. From the sixth, when he was mauled against the ropes, Davis fought an uphill battle, unable to deliver his left with its usual steam, while Ambers fired some of the strongest and most accurate punches in his career. The Brooklyn boxer had serious trouble completing the ninth and tenth rounds. The loss was the first in Davis's professional career, but it seemed the majority of the crowd were there to see him lose. Davis had lost many of his fans when he was arrested for assault of a man in a candy store a few months before, requiring him to pay bail.

He then fought a memorable non-title fight against welterweight champion Fritzie Zivic on November 15. Zivic knocked Davis down in the first round and thumbed Davis in the eye in the second. Several accounts also wrote that Zivic, a master in the art of using his elbows in clinches to hurt an opponent, and rubbing the laces of his gloves against their eyes, had made several similar moves that provoked his short tempered opponent. Davis then went berserk and hit Zivic with no fewer than 10 foul blows, including a kick to the groin, causing the referee to disqualify him. He then kicked the referee and had to be restrained from attacking Zivic. One source present said the kick to the referee was accidental as he was trying to fend off Luke Carney, Zivic's manager who was hitting him from behind while he was restrained by police. The crowd threw a mountain of debris into the ring in protest. New York State boxing commissioner Bill Brown, said "That, as far as we are concerned is the last we will see of Mr. Davis around here. He is through." For this behavior, the New York Boxing Commission fined him $2,500 and disqualified him from boxing in New York State for life, although he was later re-instated. Several months after the first match, Davis joined the army in early 1941, on the advice of his manager. With the gate receipts going to the U.S. Army Relief fund, Zivic and Davis fought a more restrained rematch on July 7, 1941, which Zivic won by a 10th-round TKO. The exceptional Jewish trainer Ray Arcel attempted to train Davis for the rematch, but Davis had been away from boxing nearly six months while in the army. Zivic tortured Davis for nine of the ten rounds requiring him to be hospitalized, though the boxing appeared clean.

=== Win over former champ Bob Montgomery, 1944 ===
Davis' last victory over a name fighter came on February 18, 1944, before an audience of 17,654, at the expense of former and future NYSAC lightweight champion and future boxing hall-of-famer Bob Montgomery, who he knocked out in the first round. Though a 4-1 underdog, Davis came out swinging and in the first fifteen seconds put Montgomery down with a left to the jaw for a count of four. After he arose, Davis caught him along the ropes, delivering another left to the jaw, and when he went down the referee counted him out. The ending, 1:03 into the first round, was the fastest knockout at Madison Square Garden since it had opened in 1925. The fight was Davis' first in the Garden since he had been barred from boxing in New York, after his fight against Fritzie Zivic. Montgomery would go on to take the world lightweight crown from Beau Jack only two weeks later.

He lost a ten round decision to former lightweight champion Beau Jack on March 17 of that same year, before 19,963 fans at Madison Square Garden. In a decisive victory for Beau Jack, Davis lost on points in all ten rounds according to one judge, and was awarded only one round by the referee. The Associated Press gave eight rounds to Jack, with two even. Some boxing historians would credit Davis's loss to his inability to adopt a better defense against a boxer with the extraordinary attack of Jack. Instead of taking his time, and focusing on defense, Davis chose too often to slug it out with Jack who won the infighting most of the time. In the first round, Davis did well slugging it out with Jack, but the advantage was short lived. By the third, Davis took repeated left hooks to the head and was in serious trouble at the end of the round, taking blow after blow against the ropes right before the bell. A long left hook spun and injured Davis's eye in the sixth. At the end of the tenth, Davis slipped to the canvas after the mauling he had taken but took no count and was up as the final bell sounded. In the sweeping victory, the Associated Press gave nine rounds to Jack, with only one even.

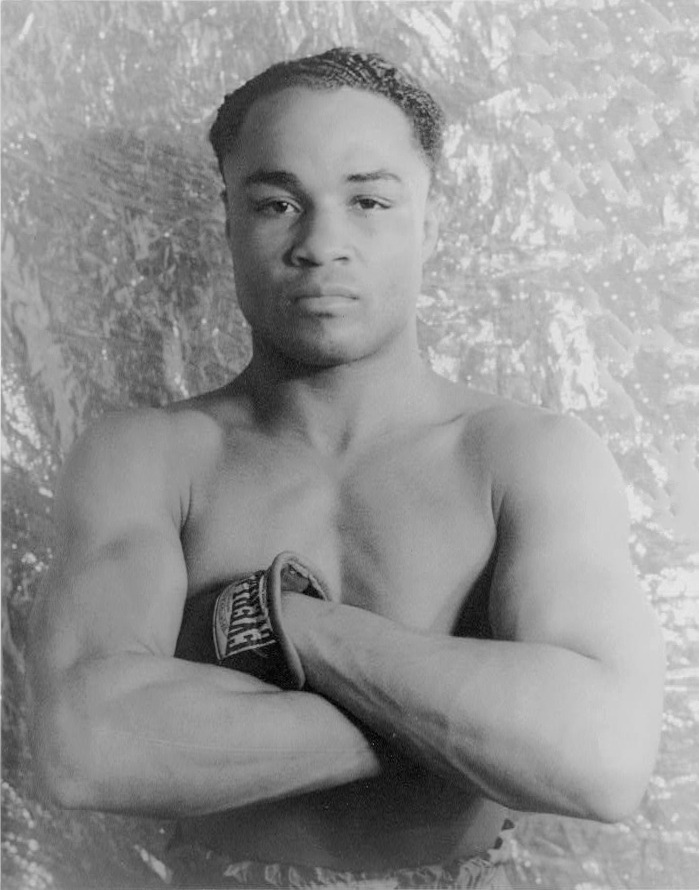
Champion Henry Armstrong

He lost by second round technical knockout to former triple titleholder Henry Armstrong before 16,084, at Madison Square Garden on June 15, 1944. In a brutal and decisive loss, Armstrong caught Davis against the ropes in the first round, used infighting to slow him, then let loose with a long range right that put Davis down once, and again shortly before the bell. In the second, Armstrong came out of his corner and battered Davis about the ring, flooring him first for a count of nine. When Davis arose, Armstrong caught him with a lightning fast right hook to the chin, causing Davis to reel far back and then pitch forward on his face. With no need for a count, the referee ended the bout.

Davis' last big fight came against future middleweight champion Rocky Graziano, who achieved a technical knockout against him in the fourth round of a May 12, 1945, match at Madison Square Garden before a crowd of 15,656. Davis was down once in the first, twice in the third, and once in the fourth. In an exciting match, Graziano was down by the second. Davis's drop to the canvas in the third occurred seconds after the closing bell resulting in a protest from Davis's corner. As expected, Davis was still groggy as the fourth began, and Graziano put him down quickly. He got up, but Graziano found his chin, and referee stopped the bout 44 seconds into the fourth.

== Life outside boxing ==
Davis enlisted in the Army in early 1941, where he was sent to Camp Hulen, Texas, and put on desert maneuvers. He was able to travel and continue his boxing career while in the service. He was discharged around August 1943. His only child had been born in 1942, not long after he married his wife Barbara.

In his boxing retirement, around 1945, he bought a neighborhood tavern, "Dudy's", and invested in two racehorses. After a year of ownership he thought of selling the bar and moving the family to Florida.

=== Death ===
After his Army service and boxing retirement, on November 21, 1945, Davis was drinking beer at his bar Dudy's in Brooklyn's Brownsville neighborhood around 2:45 a.m. New York had been suffering a crime spree as the number of police serving in World War II had diminished those available on the street to fight crime. Davis was in the process of selling the bar, and was with the new owner Arthur Polansky, a bartender, and an off-duty cop, when four armed robbers walked in. Earlier that night, the armed men had robbed five other taverns. Davis punched one of the robbers in the jaw for speaking rudely to Polansky, and was shot three times, but still tried to chase the other three who sped off in a waiting car. During the short pursuit, he was shot a fatal fourth time, and died outside the tavern at the age of 25. He was buried in Brooklyn's Montefiore Cemetery, leaving his wife and two-year-old son.

On November 22, 1945, a headlined article about his death, including a photograph of Davis, was on the front page of The New York Times.

== Selected fights ==
4 Wins, 6 Losses, 2 Draws
Result	Opponent(s)	Date	Location	Duration	Notes
Win	Jack Sharkey, Jr.	Apr 2, 1938	Brooklyn, NY	8 Rounds	
Draw	Jack Sharkey, Jr.	Jun 20, 1938	Woodhaven, Queens	6 Rounds	
Draw	Jack Sharkey, Jr.	Sep 16, 1938	New York City	6 Rounds	
Win	Tony Canzoneri	Nov 1, 1939	New York City	3rd Round TKO	Former double world champ
Win	Tippy Larkin	Dec 15, 1939	New York City	5th Round KO	1945 Light welter champ
Loss	Lou Ambers	Feb 23, 1940	New York City	10 Round UD	World light champ
Loss	Fritzie Zivic	Nov 15, 1940	New York City	10 Rounds, DQ	World welter champ Non-title
Loss	Fritzie Zivic	Jul 2, 1941	New York City	10 Rounds, TKO	World welter champ Non-title
Win	Bob Montgomery	Feb 18, 1944	New York City	1st Round TKO	Former World light champ
Loss	Beau Jack	Mar 17, 1944	New York City	10 Rounds UD	Former NYSAC light champ
Loss	Henry Armstrong	Jun 15, 1944	New York City	2nd Round TKO	Career feather, light, & welter champ
Loss	Rocky Graziano	May 25, 1945	New York City	4th Round TKO	1948 World middle champ

== See also ==
- List of select Jewish boxers
