= Tommy Bell (boxer) =

American boxer (1923–1994)

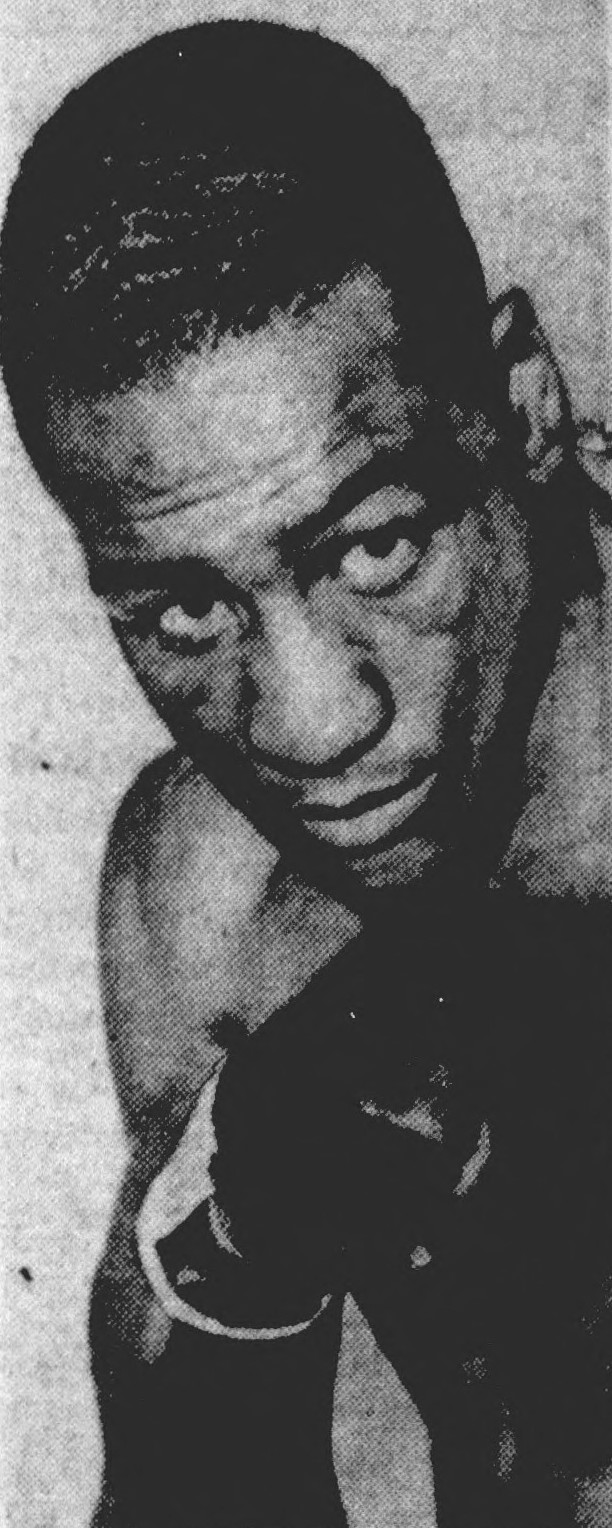
Bell, circa 1947

Tommy Bell (March 13, 1923 – July 14, 1994) was a black boxer. As a professional, he faced legendary fighters such as Jake LaMotta, Fritzie Zivic, and Kid Gavilán. Bell fought for the welterweight title against Sugar Ray Robinson in 1946.

== Early years ==
Bell was born in Ogelthorpe, Georgia, a son of Shed and Bessie Howard Bell. When he was still a child, his family relocated to Youngstown, Ohio, a steel-production center near the Pennsylvania border. Bell attended Scienceville High School before embarking on his amateur career. Bell's nephews Robert (also known as "Kool") and Ronald would go on to form the acclaimed rhythm and blues band Kool and the Gang.

== Boxing career ==
During his career as an amateur boxer, Bell won 22 fights and lost three. In 1942, he won the Ohio AAU Welterweight Championship. In his professional career, Bell participated in 82 fights and won 59. At one point in his career, he scored 34 wins in a row. In a five day period, he once knocked out five opponents. Bell was best known for a 15-round welterweight title loss to Sugar Ray Robinson, on December 20, 1946. Bell scored a knockdown, but the decision was given to Robinson after a close, violent fight. In the movie, The Godfather (1972), his name appears, alongside Jake LaMotta's, on a poster promoting their upcoming fight on 11 January, 1946.

== Later years ==
Bell returned to Youngstown after retiring from the ring in 1951. He was active as a coach and trainer, and in 1985, he was inducted into the community's Curbstone Coaches Hall of Fame. he died in 1994 of old age at 71
