= Earl Francis =

American baseball player (1935–2002)

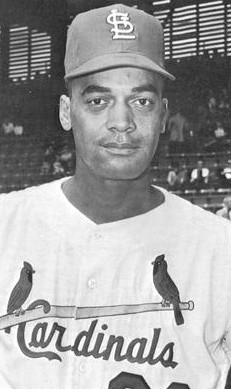
- Francis in 1965
- Pitcher
- Born: July 14, 1935; Slab Fork, West Virginia, U.S.
- Died: July 3, 2002 (aged 66); Pittsburgh, Pennsylvania, U.S.
- Batted: Right Threw: Right

MLB debut
- June 30, 1960, for the Pittsburgh Pirates

Last MLB appearance
- September 27, 1965, for the St. Louis Cardinals

MLB statistics
- Win–loss record: 16–23
- Earned run average: 3.77
- Strikeouts: 263
- Stats at Baseball Reference

Teams
- Pittsburgh Pirates (1960–1964); St. Louis Cardinals (1965)

Earl Coleman Francis (July 14, 1935 – July 3, 2002) was an American professional baseball player. A right-handed pitcher, he appeared in 103 games, 52 of them as a starter, in Major League Baseball between 1960 and 1965. The native of Slab Fork, West Virginia, stood 6 feet 2 inches (1.88 m) and weighed 210 pounds (95 kg).

Francis signed with the Pittsburgh Pirates in 1954, and after one season in Class D, he did a four-year hitch in the United States Air Force before returning to the Pirates' system in 1959. He pitched all or parts of three years in Triple-A, coming to the majors in 1960 for a seven-game mid-season trial for the eventual world champions. He started 1961 in Triple-A, then was recalled to Pittsburgh in June to begin a 21/2-year run in the big leagues.

His most productive season was 1962. Francis set personal bests in games pitched (36), games won (nine), earned run average (3.07) and complete games (five). He also threw his only MLB shutout, a three-hitter August 25 against the St. Louis Cardinals. He was the Pirates' Opening Day starting pitcher in 1963 in the traditional National League inaugural at Cincinnati on April 8. Francis dropped that contest, 5–2. During the course of the year, he saw his ERA climb to 4.53 and was only 2–6 in starting roles. He spent most of 1964 in Triple-A, then he was traded to the Cardinals during the off-season. In 1965, the Redbirds kept Francis in the minors except for two late-season appearances in relief. He toiled one more season at the Triple-A level in 1966 before leaving baseball.

In the majors, Francis won 16 of 39 decisions (.410) in 103 games and 4052/3 innings pitched. He allowed 398 hits and 181 bases on balls, striking out 263. After retiring from the field, he lived and worked in Pittsburgh until his death at age 66.
