= Slab Fork, West Virginia =

Slab Fork
- Unincorporated community
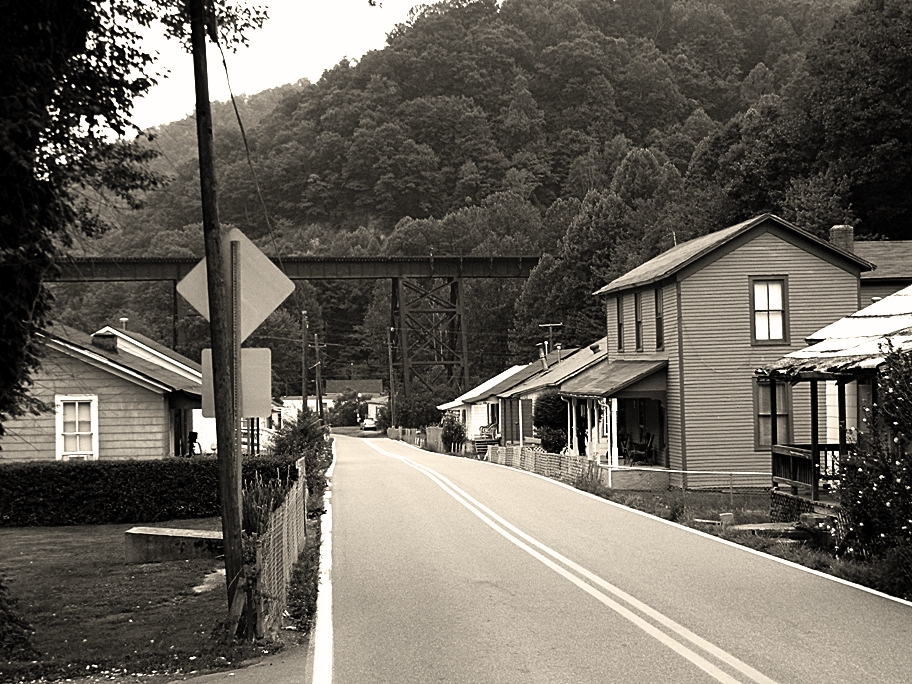
- Street view, Slab Fork, West Virginia

- Location within the state of West Virginia Slab Fork (the United States)
- Coordinates: 37°41′13″N 81°19′53″W
- Country: United States
- State: West Virginia
- County: Raleigh
- Elevation: 1,841 ft (561 m)

Population (2000)
  - Total: 202
- Time zone: UTC-5 (Eastern (EST))
  - Summer (DST): UTC-4 (EDT)
- ZIP code: 25920
- GNIS feature ID: 1555641

Slab Fork is an unincorporated community in Raleigh County, West Virginia, United States with a population of 202. Slab Fork is located along a stream of the same name and County Route 34, just east of West Virginia Route 54. The ZIP code for Slab Fork is 25920.

== Demographics ==
The community's percentage of married households is lower than the national average, but the percentage of families (households with children) is higher than the national average. The median income in Slab Fork is approximately $33,500, which is 20% lower than the national average. As of the 2000 United States Census, none of the residents had received a college degree. According to the 2000 census, 199 of the community's 202 residents were white, two were of mixed race, and one was an Alaskan native or American Indian.

== Notable people ==
- Billy Arnold, professional boxer
- Earl Francis, Major League Baseball pitcher
- Joe Goddard (baseball), Major League Baseball pitcher
- Doris Payne, noted jewel thief
- Bill Withers, Grammy Award-winning singer-songwriter
