= Chuck Woods =

American boxer (1912–1964)

Personal information
- Born: Charles Vutci; November 13, 1912 Peoria, Illinois, U.S.
- Died: November 15, 1964 (aged 52)
- Height: 5 ft 7 1/2 in (171 cm)
- Weight: Lightweight; Welterweight

Boxing career

Boxing record
- Total fights: 113
- Wins: 79
- Win by KO: 11
- Losses: 22
- Draws: 12

Chuck Woods (born Charles Vutci; November 13, 1912 – November 15, 1964) was an American professional boxer who competed from 1929 to 1939. During his career, he twice faced both Tony Canzoneri and Barney Ross, two of boxing's three-division world champions.

Woods, who was based in Detroit, Michigan, throughout his career, reached a career-high ranking of No. 6 in the world at welterweight by the National Boxing Association on April 1, 1936.

== Boxing career ==
Woods began his professional career on December 30, 1929, outpointing Neil Grubbs over 10 rounds. He went on to compile a 47–8–10 record over his first 65 bouts.

On February 26, 1935, Woods faced former three-division world champion Tony Canzoneri in Detroit, Michigan. Woods built an early lead and withstood a furious late-round rally from Canzoneri to earn a close decision victory. The two met in an immediate rematch on March 15 in Chicago, Illinois. Before the fight, Canzoneri laughed off reports that he would retire if he lost to Woods again, stating, "I couldn't quit boxing. And anyway, I won’t have to. I don't think I'll lose." Canzoneri went on to reverse the result of their first meeting, cruising to a unanimous decision victory over ten rounds.

By May 10, Canzoneri had regained the world lightweight championship, and was asked to defend the title against Woods in a third meeting. However, Woods suffered a technical knockout loss to Mike Barto on May 20, ending his prospects of challenging Canzoneri for the world lightweight title. Two fights later, on June 27, Woods defeated Marty Bagnato in Indianapolis, Indiana.

On May 1, 1936, Woods faced another three-division world champion, reigning world welterweight champion Barney Ross, in a non-title bout. The fight was attended by baseball legend Babe Ruth and refereed by former world heavyweight champion Jack Dempsey. Woods was stopped by Ross in the fifth round. Woods faced Ross again in a rematch on June 17, 1937, once more in a non-title bout. After being knocked down twice in the third round, Woods was dropped again in the fourth and counted out, giving Ross a fourth-round knockout victory.

Woods also faced future world welterweight champion Fritzie Zivic three times between 1936 and 1937. Woods won their first meeting by decision, before Zivic avenged the loss with a sixth-round knockout in their rematch. Zivic then won their third and final meeting by decision to take the trilogy, 2–1.

Woods retired from boxing in 1939 with a professional record of 79–22–12, including 11 knockout victories.

== Professional boxing record ==
| 113 fights | 79 wins | 22 losses |
|---|---|---|
| By knockout | 11 | 6 |
| By decision | 68 | 16 |
| Draws | 12 | |

| No. | Result | Record | Opponent | Type | Round, time | Date | Location | Notes |
|---|---|---|---|---|---|---|---|---|
| 113 | Win | 79–22–12 | Ted Barnes | PTS | 6 | Aug 29, 1939 | Arena Gardens Bowl, Detroit, Michigan, U.S. | |
| 112 | Win | 78–22–12 | Toots Bernstein | PTS | 6 | Apr 26, 1938 | Auditorium, Milwaukee, Wisconsin, U.S. | |
| 111 | Loss | 77–22–12 | Paulie Walker | PTS | 8 | Jan 3, 1938 | St. Nicholas Arena, New York City, New York, U.S. | |
| 110 | Win | 77–21–12 | Gordon Wallace | SD | 8 | Dec 28, 1937 | Maple Leaf Gardens, Toronto, Ontario, Canada | |
| 109 | Loss | 76–21–12 | George Salvadore | PTS | 10 | Oct 20, 1937 | Park Casino, Chicago, Illinois, U.S. | |
| 108 | Loss | 76–20–12 | Milt Aron | TKO | 5 (10) | Oct 4, 1937 | Marigold Gardens Outdoor Arena, Chicago, Illinois, U.S. | |
| 107 | Loss | 76–19–12 | Barney Ross | KO | 4 (10) | Jun 17, 1937 | Perry Stadium, Indianapolis, Indiana, U.S. | |
| 106 | Loss | 76–18–12 | Fritzie Zivic | PTS | 10 | Apr 6, 1937 | Arena Gardens, Detroit, Michigan, U.S. | |
| 105 | Win | 76–17–12 | Al Manfredo | PTS | 10 | Mar 16, 1937 | Arena Gardens, Detroit, Michigan, U.S. | |
| 104 | Win | 75–17–12 | Eddie Carroll | TKO | 7 (10) | Jan 20, 1937 | Naval Armory, Detroit, Michigan, U.S. | |
| 103 | Draw | 74–17–12 | Dominic Mancini | PTS | 10 | Jan 4, 1937 | Columbia Gymnasium Arena, Louisville, Kentucky, U.S. | |
| 102 | Win | 74–17–11 | Tony Herrera | PTS | 10 | Dec 9, 1936 | I.M.A. Auditorium, Flint, Michigan, U.S. | |
| 101 | Loss | 73–17–11 | Eddie Carroll | KO | 2 (10) | Nov 2, 1936 | Marigold Gardens, Chicago, Illinois, U.S. | |
| 100 | Win | 73–16–11 | Don Lemanski | PTS | 8 | Oct 26, 1936 | Eagles Club, Milwaukee, Wisconsin, U.S. | |
| 99 | Loss | 72–16–11 | Fritzie Zivic | KO | 6 (10) | Oct 16, 1936 | Municipal Auditorium, St. Louis, Missouri, U.S. | |
| 98 | Win | 72–15–11 | Laddie Tonielli | PTS | 10 | Oct 6, 1936 | Detroit, Michigan, U.S. | |
| 97 | Loss | 71–15–11 | Wildcat O'Connor | UD | 10 | Sep 14, 1936 | Erie Stadium, Erie, Pennsylvania, U.S. | |
| 96 | Win | 71–14–11 | Maxie Strub | PTS | 10 | Aug 21, 1936 | Erie, Pennsylvania, U.S. | |
| 95 | Win | 70–14–11 | Pat Murphy | PTS | 10 | Aug 14, 1936 | Navin Field, Detroit, Michigan, U.S. | |
| 94 | Win | 69–14–11 | Sammy Chivas | PTS | 10 | Aug 7, 1936 | Navin Field, Detroit, Michigan, U.S. | |
| 93 | Win | 68–14–11 | Milt Aron | UD | 10 | Aug 3, 1936 | Marigold Gardens Outdoor Arena, Chicago, Illinois, U.S. | |
| 92 | Win | 67–14–11 | Joe Sutka | TKO | 2 (10) | Jul 29, 1936 | Navin Field, Detroit, Michigan, U.S. | |
| 91 | Loss | 66–14–11 | Barney Ross | TKO | 5 (10) | May 1, 1936 | Jefferson County Armory, Louisville, Kentucky, U.S. | |
| 90 | Loss | 66–13–11 | Laddie Tonielli | PTS | 8 | Mar 25, 1936 | Eagles Club, Milwaukee, Wisconsin, U.S. | |
| 89 | Win | 66–12–11 | Jimmy Salvadore | KO | 3 (10) | Mar 18, 1936 | Armory, Muncie, Indiana, U.S. | |
| 88 | Win | 65–12–11 | Billy Celebron | PTS | 8 | Mar 4, 1936 | Eagles Club, Milwaukee, Wisconsin, U.S. | |
| 87 | Win | 64–12–11 | Fritzie Zivic | PTS | 10 | Feb 24, 1936 | Northside Arena, Pittsburgh, Pennsylvania, U.S. | |
| 86 | Win | 63–12–11 | Pat Murphy | PTS | 10 | Feb 17, 1936 | Marigold Gardens, Chicago, Illinois, U.S. | |
| 85 | Win | 62–12–11 | Laddie Tonielli | PTS | 10 | Feb 10, 1936 | Marigold Gardens, Chicago, Illinois, U.S. | |
| 84 | Win | 61–12–11 | Willard Brown | UD | 10 | Jan 15, 1936 | Armory, Muncie, Indiana, U.S. | |
| 83 | Win | 60–12–11 | Tony Herrera | PTS | 10 | Nov 25, 1935 | Armory, Saginaw, Michigan, U.S. | |
| 82 | Win | 59–12–11 | Mike Barto | PTS | 10 | Oct 21, 1935 | Northside Arena, Pittsburgh, Pennsylvania, U.S. | |
| 81 | Win | 58–12–11 | Pete Petroskey | PTS | 10 | Oct 18, 1935 | Armory, Saginaw, Michigan, U.S. | |
| 80 | Win | 57–12–11 | Jimmy Cholak | PTS | 10 | Oct 11, 1935 | Armory, Saginaw, Michigan, U.S. | |
| 79 | Loss | 56–12–11 | Holman Williams | PTS | 10 | Oct 2, 1935 | Olympia Stadium, Detroit, Michigan, U.S. | |
| 78 | Loss | 56–11–11 | Wesley Ramey | PTS | 10 | Sep 13, 1935 | Civic Auditorium, Grand Rapids, Michigan, U.S. | |
| 77 | Win | 56–10–11 | Tracy Cox | PTS | 10 | Aug 8, 1935 | Outdoor Sports Arena, Indianapolis, Indiana, U.S. | |
| 76 | Win | 55–10–11 | Maxie Strub | PTS | 10 | Jul 19, 1935 | Arena Gardens, Detroit, Michigan, U.S. | |
| 75 | Win | 54–10–11 | Matty Bagnato | PTS | 10 | Jun 27, 1935 | Outdoor Sports Arena, Indianapolis, Indiana, U.S. | |
| 74 | Win | 53–10–11 | Vincent Reed | UD | 10 | Jun 10, 1935 | Hickey Park, Millvale, Pennsylvania, U.S. | |
| 73 | Loss | 52–10–11 | Mike Barto | TKO | 5 (8) | May 20, 1935 | Hickey Park, Millvale, Pennsylvania, U.S. | |
| 72 | Draw | 52–9–11 | Tracy Cox | PTS | 10 | May 10, 1935 | Armory, Indianapolis, Indiana, U.S. | |
| 71 | Win | 52–9–10 | Dominic Mancini | PTS | 10 | May 3, 1935 | Armory, Jeffersonville, Indiana, U.S. | |
| 70 | Win | 51–9–10 | Mike Barto | SD | 8 | Apr 25, 1935 | Motor Square Garden, Pittsburgh, Pennsylvania, U.S. | |
| 69 | Win | 50–9–10 | Lou Vine | PTS | 10 | Apr 18, 1935 | National Guard Armory, Kalamazoo, Michigan, U.S. | |
| 68 | Win | 49–9–10 | Charlie Bochio | TKO | 7 (10) | Apr 1, 1935 | Armory, Kalamazoo, Michigan, U.S. | |
| 67 | Loss | 48–9–10 | Tony Canzoneri | UD | 10 | Mar 15, 1935 | Chicago Stadium, Chicago, Illinois, U.S. | |
| 66 | Win | 48–8–10 | Tony Canzoneri | PTS | 10 | Feb 26, 1935 | Olympia Stadium, Detroit, Michigan, U.S. | |
| 65 | Win | 47–8–10 | Young Joe Gans | KO | 6 (10) | Feb 13, 1935 | Detroit, Michigan, U.S. | |
| 64 | Draw | 46–8–10 | Young Joe Gans | PTS | 10 | Jan 23, 1935 | Arena Gardens, Detroit, Michigan, U.S. | |
| 63 | Win | 46–8–9 | Thurston McKinney | PTS | 10 | Dec 19, 1934 | Arena Gardens, Detroit, Michigan, U.S. | |
| 62 | Win | 45–8–9 | Billy Miller | UD | 10 | Dec 6, 1934 | Auditorium, Milwaukee, Wisconsin, U.S. | |
| 61 | Loss | 44–8–9 | Billy Miller | PTS | 10 | Nov 9, 1934 | Auditorium, Milwaukee, Wisconsin, U.S. | |
| 60 | Win | 44–7–9 | Mickey McAllister | TKO | 2 (8) | Oct 26, 1934 | Arena, Hazel Park, Michigan, U.S. | |
| 59 | Win | 43–7–9 | Eddie Koppy | PTS | 10 | Sep 28, 1934 | Detroit, Michigan, U.S. | |
| 58 | Win | 42–7–9 | Charlie Bochio | PTS | 8 | Aug 17, 1934 | Dearborn, Michigan, U.S. | |
| 57 | Win | 41–7–9 | Steve Shea | PTS | 8 | Aug 3, 1934 | Hazel Park, Michigan, U.S. | |
| 56 | Loss | 40–7–9 | Ritchie Mack | PTS | 10 | Jan 8, 1934 | Coliseum Arena, New Orleans, Louisiana, U.S. | |
| 55 | Win | 40–6–9 | Paul Quartararo | PTS | 6 | Dec 18, 1933 | Coliseum Arena, New Orleans, Louisiana, U.S. | |
| 54 | Win | 39–6–9 | George Clausen | NWS | 8 | Dec 11, 1933 | Mobile, Alabama, U.S. | |
| 53 | Win | 38–6–9 | Paul Quartararo | PTS | 4 | Nov 27, 1933 | Coliseum Arena, New Orleans, Louisiana, U.S. | |
| 52 | Win | 37–6–9 | Boomer Brooker | PTS | 4 | Nov 20, 1933 | Coliseum Arena, New Orleans, Louisiana, U.S. | |
| 51 | Win | 36–6–9 | Marty Gornick | PTS | 6 | Oct 11, 1933 | Armory, Detroit, Michigan, U.S. | |
| 50 | Win | 35–6–9 | Iowa Joe Rivers | UD | 10 | Sep 22, 1933 | Windsor Arena, Windsor, Ontario, Canada | |
| 49 | Win | 34–6–9 | Lee Sheppard | NWS | 4 | Aug 7, 1933 | Swayne Field, Toledo, Ohio, U.S. | |
| 48 | Win | 33–6–9 | Johnny Stroppa | PTS | 10 | Jun 23, 1933 | Arena Gardens, Detroit, Michigan, U.S. | |
| 47 | Win | 32–6–9 | Steve Shea | NWS | 6 | Jun 5, 1933 | Coliseum, Toledo, Ohio, U.S. | |
| 46 | Win | 31–6–9 | Young Kid McCoy | TKO | 5 (10) | Jun 1, 1933 | Naval Armory, Detroit, Michigan, U.S. | |
| 45 | Win | 30–6–9 | Holman Williams | PTS | 10 | May 4, 1933 | Naval Armory, Detroit, Michigan, U.S. | |
| 44 | Draw | 29–6–9 | Gideon Gowatch | NWS | 6 | Mar 10, 1933 | Olympia Stadium, Detroit, Michigan, U.S. | |
| 43 | Win | 29–6–8 | Bud Jones | PTS | 5 | Jan 12, 1933 | Grand Rapids, Michigan, U.S. | |
| 42 | Draw | 28–6–8 | Orrie Mosher | PTS | 6 | Nov 17, 1932 | Grand Rapids, Michigan, U.S. | |
| 41 | Win | 28–6–7 | Stanley Krannenberg | PTS | 6 | Oct 26, 1932 | Grand Rapids, Michigan, U.S. | |
| 40 | Win | 27–6–7 | Billy Gladstone | PTS | 10 | Oct 20, 1932 | Arena Gardens, Detroit, Michigan, U.S. | |
| 39 | Win | 26–6–7 | Holman Williams | PTS | 8 | Oct 12, 1932 | Arena Gardens, Detroit, Michigan, U.S. | |
| 38 | Loss | 25–6–7 | Eddie Koppy | PTS | 10 | Aug 26, 1932 | Arena Gardens, Detroit, Michigan, U.S. | |
| 37 | Win | 25–5–7 | Walter McTaglen | PTS | 4 | Aug 11, 1932 | Dearborn, Michigan, U.S. | |
| 36 | Draw | 24–5–7 | Press Johnson | PTS | 10 | Jul 25, 1932 | Columbus, Ohio, U.S. | |
| 35 | Win | 24–5–6 | Don McLeod | PTS | 8 | Jul 22, 1932 | Dearborn, Michigan, U.S. | |
| 34 | Win | 23–5–6 | Mike Flaherty | NWS | 8 | Jun 28, 1932 | Shea Gymnasium, Toledo, Ohio, U.S. | |
| 33 | Win | 22–5–6 | Charlie Crocker | TKO | 5 | Jun 24, 1932 | Flint, Michigan, U.S. | |
| 32 | Draw | 21–5–6 | Jimmy Collins | NWS | 10 | Jun 14, 1932 | Shea Gymnasium, Toledo, Ohio, U.S. | |
| 31 | Win | 21–5–5 | Leo Knopp | NWS | 8 | May 31, 1932 | Shea Gymnasium, Toledo, Ohio, U.S. | |
| 30 | Win | 20–5–5 | Connie Delmont | NWS | 8 | May 24, 1932 | Shea Gymnasium, Toledo, Ohio, U.S. | |
| 29 | Draw | 19–5–5 | Don McLeod | PTS | 8 | May 17, 1932 | Arena A.C., Mount Clemens, Michigan, U.S. | |
| 28 | Win | 19–5–4 | Eddie Felton | PTS | 6 | May 13, 1932 | Olympia Stadium, Detroit, Michigan, U.S. | |
| 27 | Win | 18–5–4 | Claude Kidd | KO | 1 (6) | Apr 26, 1932 | Shea Gymnasium, Toledo, Ohio, U.S. | |
| 26 | Win | 17–5–4 | Benny McArthur | PTS | 8 | Apr 23, 1932 | Saginaw, Michigan, U.S. | |
| 25 | Draw | 16–5–4 | Johnny Conley | NWS | 8 | Apr 5, 1932 | Shea Gymnasium, Toledo, Ohio, U.S. | |
| 24 | Draw | 16–5–3 | Jackie Elverrillo | PTS | 8 | Mar 16, 1932 | Arena Gardens, Detroit, Michigan, U.S. | |
| 23 | Win | 16–5–2 | Eddie Barnowski | PTS | 4 | Feb 19, 1932 | Olympia Stadium, Detroit, Michigan, U.S. | |
| 22 | Win | 15–5–2 | Carl Adams | TKO | 5 | Feb 16, 1932 | Mount Clemens, Michigan, U.S. | |
| 21 | Win | 14–5–2 | Eddie Heinz | PTS | 8 | Feb 1, 1932 | Saginaw, Michigan, U.S. | |
| 20 | Win | 13–5–2 | Mickey Morris | PTS | 6 | Jan 15, 1932 | Saginaw, Michigan, U.S. | |
| 19 | Loss | 12–5–2 | Gideon Gowatch | PTS | 6 | Dec 9, 1931 | Detroit, Michigan, U.S. | |
| 18 | Draw | 12–4–2 | Tony Manini | PTS | 6 | Sep 28, 1931 | Courthouse Arena, New Orleans, Louisiana, U.S. | |
| 17 | Loss | 12–4–1 | Euclid Decker | PTS | 6 | Aug 25, 1931 | Coliseum Arena, New Orleans, Louisiana, U.S. | |
| 16 | Loss | 12–3–1 | Benny Picataci | PTS | 6 | Aug 17, 1931 | Courthouse Arena, New Orleans, Louisiana, U.S. | |
| 15 | Loss | 12–2–1 | Sammy Moss | PTS | 4 | Jul 9, 1931 | Pasadena Arena, Pasadena, California, U.S. | |
| 14 | Win | 12–1–1 | Frankie Cebrat | PTS | 6 | Apr 8, 1931 | Armory, Benton Harbor, Michigan, U.S. | |
| 13 | Win | 11–1–1 | Guy Muldoon | PTS | 4 | Jan 27, 1931 | Mount Clemens, Michigan, U.S. | |
| 12 | Win | 10–1–1 | Lew Harris | PTS | 6 | Jan 13, 1931 | Arena A.C., Mount Clemens, Michigan, U.S. | |
| 11 | Win | 9–1–1 | Armand Pringle | PTS | 3 | Dec 23, 1930 | Arena A.C., Mount Clemens, Michigan, U.S. | |
| 10 | Win | 8–1–1 | Jimmy Thomas | MD | 6 | Oct 17, 1930 | Moose Lodge, Pittsburgh, Pennsylvania, U.S. | |
| 9 | Win | 7–1–1 | Don McLeod | PTS | 6 | Sep 17, 1930 | Mount Clemens, Michigan, U.S. | |
| 8 | Loss | 6–1–1 | Joey Katkish | PTS | 6 | Aug 12, 1930 | Mount Clemens, Michigan, U.S. | |
| 7 | Draw | 6–0–1 | Bobby Crothers | PTS | 6 | Jul 24, 1930 | Port Huron, Michigan, U.S. | |
| 6 | Win | 6–0 | Honey Boy Markham | KO | 2 (4) | Jul 2, 1930 | Windsor Arena, Windsor, Ontario, Canada | |
| 5 | Win | 5–0 | Mickey Horton | PTS | 6 | May 22, 1930 | Armory, Pontiac, Michigan, U.S. | |
| 4 | Win | 4–0 | Alex Helzer | PTS | 6 | Apr 24, 1930 | Port Huron, Michigan, U.S. | |
| 3 | Win | 3–0 | Tommy DeRezzi | PTS | 4 | Apr 15, 1930 | Fairview A.C., Detroit, Michigan, U.S. | |
| 2 | Win | 2–0 | Sammy Reed | PTS | 6 | Mar 28, 1930 | Battle Creek, Michigan, U.S. | |
| 1 | Win | 1–0 | Neil Grubbs | PTS | 10 | Dec 30, 1929 | Tucumcari, New Mexico, U.S. | |

== See also ==
- List of male boxers
