= Doris Payne =

American convicted jewel thief (born 1930)

- Born: Doris Marie Payne; October 10, 1930 (age 96); Slab Fork, West Virginia, U.S.
- Occupation: Jewel thief
- Conviction: Theft (January 2011)
- Penalty: 5 years imprisonment

Doris Marie Payne (born October 10, 1930) is an American convicted jewel thief.

== Early life ==
Payne was born in Slab Fork, West Virginia to a coal miner named David Payne and his wife Clemmie Gilbert Payne. She was one of six Payne siblings. She had four brothers, Albert, Clarence, David Jr., and Johnny, as well as one sister, Louise.

== Crimes ==
Payne's crimes have spanned six decades. She has been arrested many times; she is a career criminal. Payne is noted for stealing a 10-carat diamond ring, valued at $500,000 (US), from Monte Carlo in the 1970s. She fled to France, but was detained in Nice and later extradited back to Monte Carlo, where she was held for nine months before being released, as the Monégasque authorities were unable to locate the stolen gem. Payne was arrested in Ohio in the 1980s after she escaped from federal custody during a hospital visit.

On Friday, January 22, 2010, Payne was arrested in Costa Mesa, California for removing the tags from a $1,300 Burberry trench coat from a Saks Fifth Avenue store and subsequently leaving the store with the coat. On October 29, 2013, Payne, age 83, was arrested on felony larceny charges for stealing a $22,500 diamond-encrusted ring in Palm Desert, California. Payne pled guilty. On April 30, 2014, she was sentenced to two years in prison, followed by two years on parole, and was ordered to stay away from jewelry stores. She was released three months later, however, due to prison overcrowding. In July 2015 she was reportedly stealing again and was believed to have stolen a $33,000 (US) ring, although this has not been proven. On October 23, 2015 she was caught on security cameras putting Christian Dior earrings valued at $690.00 in her pocket at an Atlanta, Georgia Saks Fifth Avenue store. She was arrested and charged with shoplifting by Officers from the Atlanta Police Department.

Payne has openly spoken about her crimes and has used at least 20 aliases, at least ten social security numbers and at least nine dates of birth. It is alleged in Charlotte, North Carolina, that on July 11, 2015, Payne visited a jewelry store at SouthPark Mall. After she left, store employees realized a diamond ring valued at $33,000 was missing from a showcase. Charlotte-Mecklenburg Police Department did not issue an official statement or APB, but local ABC affiliate WSOC-TV obtained a copy of an email sent to all area jewelers regarding the alleged crime and alerting them to be on the lookout. An arrest warrant was issued for Payne in August 2015, by the Charlotte-Mecklenburg sheriff's department.

In Atlanta, Georgia, on December 13, 2016 she was again arrested on larceny charges. On July 17, 2017 she was arrested for stealing $86.22 worth of merchandise from an Atlanta area Wal-Mart, while wearing the ankle bracelet from her previous arrest.

== In popular culture ==
There is a documentary film about her life, entitled The Life and Crimes of Doris Payne (2013), in which Payne describes in detail many of her crimes, from the earliest thefts in her youth, up to her arrest in 2011, at age 80, for stealing a diamond ring from a Macy's department store. The trial for this crime is chronicled in the documentary, and her last interview in the film takes place in prison, as she was convicted of the crime. Updates during the credits, however, inform the audience that she had since been released, only to commit, and be convicted of, another jewelry theft soon after at age 83.

In 2016, a hidden-camera scenario on the show What Would You Do? had a character based on Payne.

As of 2018, a film of Payne's life is being developed by Codeblack Films. Actress Tessa Thompson is set to portray Payne in the film.

== Other sources ==
- "International Jewelry Thief Talks To 10News". 10News.com. January 22, 2011.
- 80-year-old jewel thief convicted - World - NZ Herald News
- "80-year-old jewel thief faces 5 years in prison". Los Angeles Times. January 15, 2011.
