= Laddie Tonielli =

American boxer (1912–1992)

Personal information
- Born: Ernesto Dominic Tonielli (Note: Also spelled Ernest.); January 19, 1912 Torino, Illinois, U.S.
- Died: June 7, 1992 (aged 80) Marseilles, Illinois, U.S.
- Height: 5 ft 9 1/2 in (177 cm)
- Weight: Welterweight

Boxing career
- Stance: Orthodox

Boxing record
- Total fights: 62
- Wins: 41
- Win by KO: 15
- Losses: 14
- Draws: 7

Laddie Tonielli (born Ernesto Dominic Tonielli; January 19, 1912 – June 7, 1992) was an American professional boxer who competed from 1932 to 1936. Tonielli was the first of only four boxers to knock out former world welterweight champion Fritzie Zivic, who later claimed that Tonielli was the only opponent to have legitimately knocked him out for the full ten-count.

In July 2018, the Seattle Sutton Marseilles Museum in Marseilles, Illinois, honored Tonielli with an exhibition dedicated to his life and boxing career. His son, Terry Tonielli, also gave a presentation about his father's life as part of the tribute. As of 2026, Tonielli and his wife, Minnie, are still commemorated through the Minnie and Laddie Tonielli Memorial Scholarship, awarded at Ottawa Township High School in Ottawa, Illinois.

== Early life ==
Ernesto Dominic "Laddie" Tonielli was born on January 19, 1912, in Torino, Illinois, a small coal-mining village in Will County. Incorporated in 1905, Torino had a population of 514 according to the 1910 United States census. Following the closure of its coal mine in 1918, the village experienced a sharp decline, with its population falling to just 105 by the 1920 United States census. Its post office closed that same year, and the village was completely abandoned by 1928.

== Boxing career ==
Fighting out of Marseilles, Illinois, Tonielli compiled a record of 28–1–2 in his first 31 professional bouts before suffering his second career defeat in an eight-round decision loss to Sherald Kennard on June 6, 1934.

On October 26, 1934, Tonielli faced future world welterweight champion Fritzie Zivic in the first of their three career meetings, knocking him out in the second round. (Note: Contemporary reports indicate that the knockout occurred in the third round.) Zivic later claimed that Tonielli was the only opponent to have legitimately knocked him out for the full ten-count.

On February 10, 1936, Tonielli faced Chuck Woods in the first of their three meetings, losing by decision over ten rounds. The two met in a rematch on March 25 in Milwaukee, Wisconsin, with Tonielli avenging his earlier defeat by outpointing Woods over eight rounds.

On June 10, 1936, Tonielli faced three-division world champion and reigning world welterweight champion Barney Ross in a non-title bout. Ross bloodied Tonielli's nose in the second round before knocking him out with a right to the jaw in the fifth.

After Cleto Locatelli, Fritzie Zivic's originally scheduled opponent, suffered an injury during training, Tonielli stepped in as a last-minute replacement. The bout was subsequently postponed twice before taking place on July 6, 1936. The first three rounds of the rematch were action-packed, but in the third, after a hook from Tonielli sent Zivic into the ropes, Zivic emerged with his head down and collided with Tonielli, opening a deep gash on Tonielli's forehead that began bleeding profusely. At the end of the round, referee Red Robinson stopped the bout due to the severity of the cut, awarding Zivic a fourth-round technical knockout victory. Tonielli immediately protested the stoppage from his corner.

Tonielli and Zivic agreed to a ten-round rubber match at Forbes Field in Pittsburgh on July 30, 1936. Zivic once again prevailed by technical knockout, with the bout stopped 35 seconds into the sixth round after Tonielli began bleeding heavily from the same cut sustained in their previous meeting just weeks earlier.

On October 6, 1936, Tonielli faced Chuck Woods in a rubber match in what would be his penultimate professional bout, losing by decision over ten rounds.

Tonielli retired from professional boxing in 1936 with a record of 41–14–7, including 15 victories by knockout. Throughout his career, he was managed by Felix Kolk.

== Personal life ==
Tonielli married Minnie A. Gotta on September 15, 1934. The couple resided in Marseilles, Illinois, and had two sons, Ernest Robert and Terry John.

== Professional boxing record ==
62 fights	41 wins	14 losses
By knockout	15	6
By decision	26	8
Draws	7	

No.	Result	Record	Opponent	Type	Round, time	Date	Location	Notes
62	Loss	41–14–7	Milt Aron	KO	5 (10)	Dec 12, 1936	124th Field Artillery Armory, Chicago, Illinois, U.S.	
61	Loss	41–13–7	Chuck Woods	PTS	10	Oct 6, 1936	Detroit, Michigan, U.S.	
60	Loss	41–12–7	Fritzie Zivic	TKO	6 (10)	Jul 30, 1936	Forbes Field, Pittsburgh, Pennsylvania, U.S.	
59	Loss	41–11–7	Fritzie Zivic	TKO	4 (10)	Jul 6, 1936	Hickey Park, Millvale, Pennsylvania, U.S.	
58	Loss	41–10–7	Barney Ross	TKO	5 (10)	Jun 10, 1936	State Fair Park, Milwaukee, Wisconsin, U.S.	
57	Win	41–9–7	Don Lemanski	PTS	8	Apr 22, 1936	Eagles Club, Milwaukee, Wisconsin, U.S.	
56	Win	40–9–7	Chuck Woods	PTS	8	Mar 25, 1936	Eagles Club, Milwaukee, Wisconsin, U.S.	
55	Loss	39–9–7	Don Lemanski	PTS	8	Mar 16, 1936	Eagles Club, Milwaukee, Wisconsin, U.S.	
54	Draw	39–8–7	Tracy Cox	SD	10	Feb 21, 1936	Armory, Indianapolis, Indiana, U.S.	
53	Loss	39–8–6	Chuck Woods	PTS	10	Feb 10, 1936	Marigold Gardens, Chicago, Illinois, U.S.	
52	Loss	39–7–6	Don Lemanski	PTS	8	Jan 27, 1936	Auditorium, Milwaukee, Wisconsin, U.S.	
51	Win	39–6–6	Billy Miller	PTS	10	Jan 11, 1936	Cicero Stadium, Cicero, Illinois, U.S.	
50	Loss	38–6–6	Billy Celebron	TKO	1 (10)	Oct 28, 1935	Marigold Gardens, Chicago, Illinois, U.S.	
49	Win	38–5–6	Puggy Weinert	PTS	10	Sep 16, 1935	Marigold Gardens Outdoor Arena, Chicago, Illinois, U.S.	
48	Win	37–5–6	Billy Celebron	SD	10	Sep 3, 1935	Western Stadium, Chicago, Illinois, U.S.	
47	Draw	36–5–6	Jackie Elverrillo	NWS	10/10x2	Aug 12, 1935	Riverview Park, Sioux City, Iowa, U.S.	
46	Draw	36–5–5	Petey Mike	PTS	10	Aug 6, 1935	Western Stadium, Chicago, Illinois, U.S.	
45	Loss	36–5–4	Sammy Brown	PTS	10	Jul 12, 1935	Frank Chance Field, Fresno, California, U.S.	
44	Win	36–4–4	Ray Acosta	PTS	4	May 10, 1935	Legion Stadium, Hollywood, California, U.S.	
43	Draw	35–4–4	Angus Smith	PTS	4	May 10, 1935	Ventura A.C., Ventura, California, U.S.	
42	Win	35–4–3	Tony Larue	PTS	4	Apr 18, 1935	Legion Stadium, Hollywood, California, U.S.	
41	Draw	34–4–3	Sammy O'Dell	PTS	6	Apr 9, 1935	Olympic Auditorium, Los Angeles, California, U.S.	
40	Win	34–4–2	Nestor Bruggeman	PTS	8	Feb 11, 1935	Midway Arena, Chicago, Illinois, U.S.	
39	Win	33–4–2	Puggy Weinert	PTS	10	Jan 21, 1935	Marigold Gardens, Chicago, Illinois, U.S.	
38	Loss	32–4–2	Billy Miller	PTS	8	Jan 7, 1935	Marigold Gardens, Chicago, Illinois, U.S.	
37	Win	32–3–2	Toots Bernstein	PTS	6	Jan 1, 1935	Auditorium, Milwaukee, Wisconsin, U.S.	
36	Loss	31–3–2	Billy Miller	TKO	4 (8)	Nov 30, 1934	Coliseum, Chicago, Illinois, U.S.	
35	Win	31–2–2	Toots Bernstein	PTS	8	Nov 16, 1934	Cicero Stadium, Cicero, Illinois, U.S.	
34	Win	30–2–2	Fritzie Zivic	KO	2 (8)	Oct 26, 1934	Coliseum, Chicago, Illinois, U.S.	
33	Win	29–2–2	Puggy Weinert	PTS	8	Aug 14, 1934	Western Stadium, Chicago, Illinois, U.S.	
32	Loss	28–2–2	Sherald Kennard	PTS	8	Jun 6, 1934	Eagles Club, Milwaukee, Wisconsin, U.S.	
31	Loss	28–1–2	Henry Rothier	PTS	8	May 22, 1934	Western Stadium, Chicago, Illinois, U.S.	
30	Win	28–0–2	Jackie Ausborn	KO	3 (8)	Mar 19, 1934	Marigold Gardens, Chicago, Illinois, U.S.	
29	Win	27–0–2	Curtis Mills	TKO	4 (6)	Mar 16, 1934	Rainbo Fronton, Chicago, Illinois, U.S.	
28	Win	26–0–2	Eddie Chinski	PTS	6	Feb 26, 1934	Midway Arena, Chicago, Illinois, U.S.	
27	Win	25–0–2	Johnny Owens	PTS	10	Jan 26, 1934	International Arena, Kansas City, Missouri, U.S.	
26	Win	24–0–2	Johnny Terry	PTS	6	Dec 20, 1933	Arcadia Gardens, Chicago, Illinois, U.S.	
25	Win	23–0–2	Mickey O'Shea	KO	5 (6)	Dec 6, 1933	Arcadia Gardens, Chicago, Illinois, U.S.	
24	Win	22–0–2	Honey Boy Brown	KO	2 (6)	Nov 27, 1933	La Salle, Illinois, U.S.	
23	Draw	21–0–2	Johnny Liston	PTS	6	Nov 6, 1933	White City Arena, Chicago, Illinois, U.S.	
22	Win	21–0–1	Nick Broglio	KO	1 (6)	Oct 2, 1933	Marigold Gardens, Chicago, Illinois, U.S.	
21	Win	20–0–1	Solly Dukelsky	PTS	6	Sep 19, 1933	Western Stadium, Chicago, Illinois, U.S.	
20	Win	19–0–1	Honey Boy Brown	PTS	6	Sep 12, 1933	Western Stadium, Chicago, Illinois, U.S.	
19	Win	18–0–1	Andy DiVodi	PTS	6	Aug 15, 1933	Western Stadium, Chicago, Illinois, U.S.	
18	Win	17–0–1	Carlos Herrera	PTS	8	Aug 8, 1933	Western Stadium, Chicago, Illinois, U.S.	
17	Win	16–0–1	Jack Ripp	KO	1 (5)	Jul 18, 1933	Western Stadium, Chicago, Illinois, U.S.	
16	Win	15–0–1	Joe Veney	TKO	3 (6)	Jul 11, 1933	Western Stadium, Chicago, Illinois, U.S.	
15	Win	14–0–1	George Taylor	KO	6 (6)	Jun 27, 1933	Western Stadium, Chicago, Illinois, U.S.	
14	Win	13–0–1	Nick Serandos	KO	6 (6)	Jun 20, 1933	Western Stadium, Chicago, Illinois, U.S.	
13	Win	12–0–1	Norman Brown	PTS	4	Jun 16, 1933	Sparta Stadium, Chicago, Illinois, U.S.	
12	Win	11–0–1	Roy Moore	PTS	6	Apr 17, 1933	White City Arena, Chicago, Illinois, U.S.	
11	Win	10–0–1	Einar Hedquist	PTS	5	Apr 14, 1933	Rainbo Fronton, Chicago, Illinois, U.S.	
10	Win	9–0–1	Chuck Reed	KO	4 (5)	Apr 7, 1933	Rainbo Fronton, Chicago, Illinois, U.S.	
9	Win	8–0–1	Nate Hassen	KO	4 (4)	Apr 3, 1933	White City Arena, Chicago, Illinois, U.S.	
8	Draw	7–0–1	Mickey O'Shea	PTS	4	Mar 13, 1933	White City Arena, Chicago, Illinois, U.S.	
7	Win	7–0–0	Einar Hedquist	PTS	4	Feb 28, 1933	Midway Arena, Chicago, Illinois, U.S.	
6	Win	6–0–0	Jack O'Brien	TKO	4 (4)	Feb 14, 1933	Midway Arena, Chicago, Illinois, U.S.	
5	Win	5–0–0	Einar Hedquist	PTS	4	Jan 31, 1933	Midway Arena, Chicago, Illinois, U.S.	
4	Win	4–0–0	Walter Statkus	PTS	4	Jan 24, 1933	Kid Howard's Gym, Chicago, Illinois, U.S.	
3	Win	3–0–0	Jack O'Brien	KO	2 (4)	Jan 16, 1933	Midway Gardens, Chicago, Illinois, U.S.	
2	Win	2–0–0	Johnny Terry	PTS	4	Jan 10, 1933	Midway Gardens, Chicago, Illinois, U.S.	
1	Win	1–0–0	Joe Matthews	KO	4 (4)	Dec 14, 1932	La Salle, Illinois, U.S.	

== See also ==
- List of male boxers
