= Billy Arnold (boxer) =

American boxer

Billy Arnold in locker room with trainer "Young Joe" Walcott

Billy Arnold (William Marshall Arnold) (September 21, 1926 – May 18, 1995) was a highly touted welterweight/middleweight prospect of the 1940s.

Born in Slab Fork, West Virginia, Arnold turned pro November 1, 1943, while still in high school. He became an overnight sensation by racking up an impressive string of 16 straight knockout victories.

Arnold's style was similar to Sugar Ray Robinson; he was a slick boxer with lightning-fast combinations, and a knockout punch. The Ring Magazine and various newspapers across the United States touted Arnold as the next Joe Louis or Sugar Ray Robinson. Arnold was a heavy favorite to defeat Rocky Graziano, and then to go on to fight for the world title. In a brutal battle staged in March 1945, Arnold battered the rough and tough Graziano for the first few rounds. It seemed only a matter of moments when the fight would be stopped. However, Graziano absorbed the beating and went on to batter and knockout Arnold in one of the major upsets in boxing.
