= Mozo =

Mozo or El Mozo may refer to:

== People ==
- Mozo (surname)
- El Mozo, Diego de Almagro II, the son of Spanish conquistador Diego de Almagro
- El Mozo, Alonso de León, an explorer and governor who led expeditions in southern North America
- El Mozo, Francisco de Montejo the Younger, a Spanish conquistador
- El Mozo, Francisco Herrera the Younger, a Spanish painter and architect

== Arts and entertainment ==
- Mozo, a film idea that led to the creation of Red Rain (song)
- Mozo, a fictional character in Doraemon: Nobita's Chronicle of the Moon Exploration

== See also ==
- Moso (disambiguation)
- Moza (disambiguation)
