= Mouzo =

Mouzo is a surname. Notable people with the surname include:

- Roberto Mouzo (born 1953), Argentine footballer
- Federico Fattori Mouzo (born 1992), Argentine footballer

== See also ==
- Mozo (surname)
- Mouzon (disambiguation)
