= Sonny West =

Sonny West may refer to:

- Sonny Boy West (1929–1950), American boxer
- Sonny West (musician) (1937–2022), American songwriter
- Sonny West (actor) (1938–2017), American actor and stuntman, friend and bodyguard of Elvis Presley
