= Moso =

Moso or MoSo can refer to:

- MoSo, a music and technology festival in Saskatoon, Canada
- Moso (island), an island in Vanuatu
- Moso (sword), a traditional sword from Indonesia
- Missouri Southern State University, sometimes nicknamed "MoSo"
- Phyllostachys edulis, a species of bamboo also called "moso bamboo"
- Mosuo, an ethnic minority in the People's Republic of China also spelled "Moso"
- Moos in Passeier, a town in Italy known in Italian as "Moso in Passiria"
