= Ike Williams =

American boxer (1923–1994)

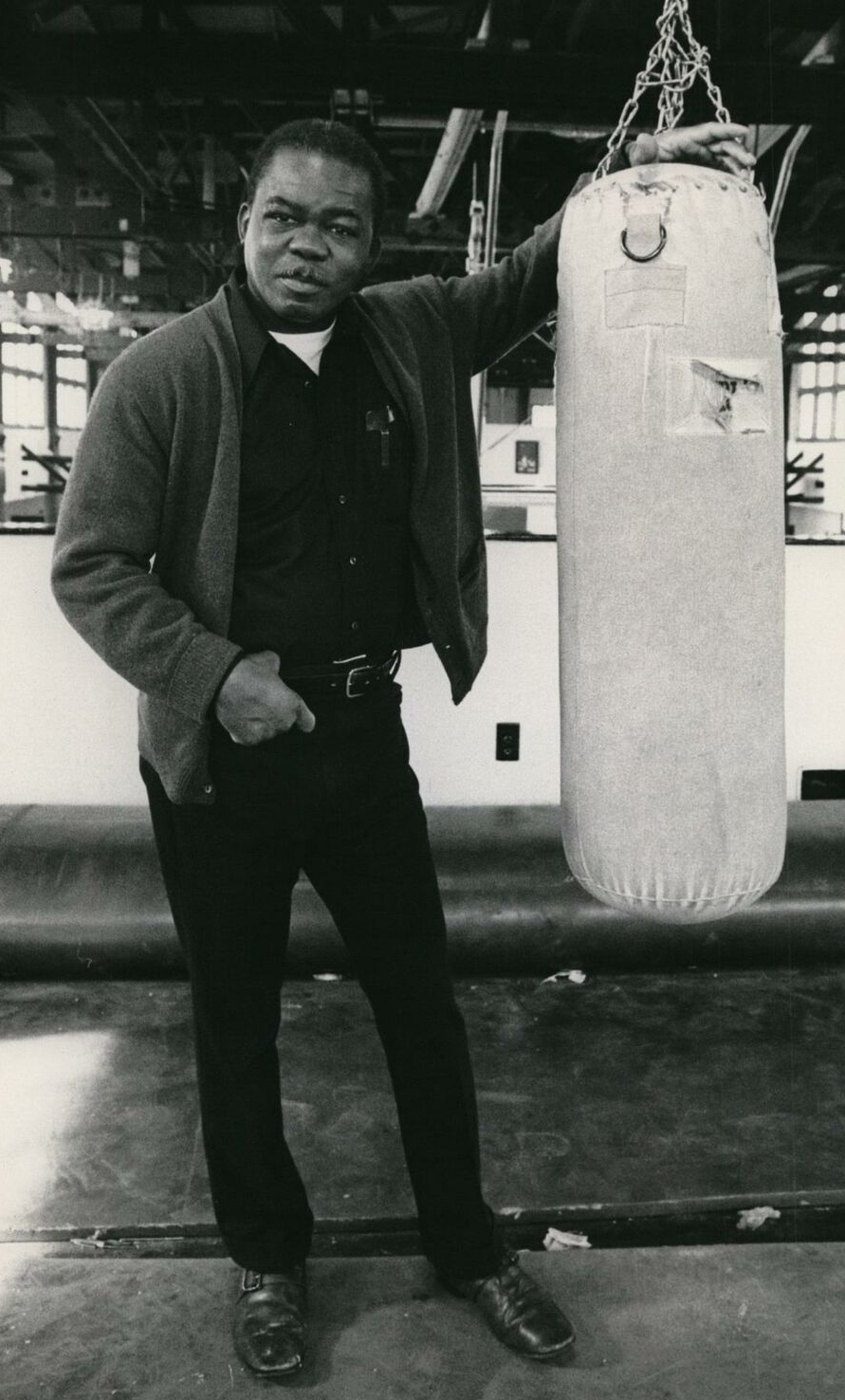
- Williams in 1972

Personal information
- Born: Isiah Williams; August 2, 1923 Brunswick, Georgia, U.S.
- Died: September 5, 1994 (aged 71) Los Angeles, California, U.S.
- Height: 5 ft 9 in (175 cm)
- Weight: Lightweight

Boxing career
- Reach: 68 in (173 cm)
- Stance: Orthodox

Boxing record
- Total fights: 157; With the inclusion of newspaper decisions
- Wins: 128
- Win by KO: 61
- Losses: 24
- Draws: 5

Isiah "Ike" Williams (August 2, 1923 – September 5, 1994) was an American professional boxer known as the Trenton Tornado. He was a lightweight world boxing champion. He took the World Lightweight Championship in April 1945 and made eight successful defenses of the title against six different fighters prior to losing the championship to Jimmy Carter in 1951. Williams was known for his great right hand, and was named to The Ring magazine's list of 100 greatest punchers of all time as well as The Ring magazine Fighter of the Year for 1948. Williams was also the Boxing Writers Association of America Fighter of the Year for 1948, was inducted into The Ring Boxing Hall of Fame (disbanded in 1987), and was an inaugural 1990 inductee to the International Boxing Hall of Fame.

== Early life ==
Williams was born in Brunswick, Georgia, on August 2, 1923. He did not turn professional until 1940 when he began boxing in Trenton, New Jersey. According to boxing lore, Williams worked as a newsboy after his family's move to Trenton, and first began boxing using his fists to defend the corner where he sold his papers.

== Professional career ==
During his career, Williams faced and defeated former lightweight champions Sammy Angott, Bob Montgomery, and Beau Jack.

=== Taking the NBA World Lightweight Championship, April 1945 ===
Williams was inducted into the U.S. Army after a close non-title win against the great lightweight Sammy Angott by ten-round decision at Shibe Park in Philadelphia on September 6, 1944, though he continued regular professional boxing during his service.

Williams won the NBA World Lightweight Championship before a crowd of 35,000 by a second-round knockout of Juan Zurita in Mexico City on April 18, 1945. Their first planned meeting in Philadelphia had been cancelled by the Pennsylvania Boxing Commission who recognized Bob Montgomery as the lightweight champion. Williams made a two fisted attack to the head of Zurita in the second which Zurita could not hold off, though he had made an effective defense in the first round. It was Zurita's first title defense. Shortly after Zurita was counted out, Williams' corner was crowded by fans, and several policeman were required to clear the ring before Williams could return to his dressing room.

==== World Lightweight Title defense against Bob Montgomery, August 1947 ====
In one of his most important title defenses, he achieved a knockout of black boxer Bob Montgomery, NYSAC Lightweight Champion, at Municipal Stadium in Philadelphia in six rounds on August 4, 1947, to become the undisputed World Lightweight Champion. Montgomery was down for a count of nine in the sixth before the bout was stopped. The victory also avenged a twelfth-round knockout loss to Montgomery from January 25, 1944. At least one source had Williams with an edge in three of the rounds, with one to Montgomery, and one too close to call. The blow that sent Montgomery to the mat in the sixth was a right to the chin by the hard punching Williams. Montgomery rose after nine but continued to take punches and was up against the ropes, and sinking to the mat on his knees before the referee stopped the bout.

==== World Lightweight Title defense against Jesse Flores, September 1948 ====
On September 23, 1948, Williams successfully defended his Lightweight title against Jesse Flores winning in a tenth-round technical knockout at Yankee Stadium in New York's Bronx. Flores had been on the mat five times during the fight, down twice in the fifth and twice in the eighth. The final blows were a left hook and then a right that sent Flores to the mat 2:07 into the tenth round.

==== World Lightweight Title defense against Enrique Bolanos, July 1949 ====
On July 21, 1949, Williams defended his title against Enrique Bolanos winning in a fourth-round technical knockout before a crowd of near 19,000 at Wrigley Field in Los Angeles. Bolanos had been sent to the canvas twice before referee Jack Dempsey decided to end the bout 2:40 into the fourth round. Bolanos was knocked to the mat for a count of eight early in the fourth, and then after rising received a series of left and right hooks that sent him to his knees near William's corner. Bolanos' manager George Parnassus threw in the towel and referee Dempsey abruptly ended the bout causing the fight to be recorded as a technical knock out.

==== World Lightweight Title defense against Freddy Dawson, December 1949 ====
On December 5, 1949, Williams defeated Freddy Dawson in a close fifteen-round decision before 10,389 fans at Convention Hall in Philadelphia. He had defeated Dawson twice in previous meetings and led in the early betting. In the post-fight decision, the two judges gave him the decision by only one round, ruling that 8 rounds were won by him and 7 by Dawson. The referee, who was closer to the action, gave him 9 rounds to 6 for Dawson. There were no knockdowns in the bout, and according to one source only one hard solid punch, a hard left to Dawson's head in the fifth. Boxing reporters already were concerned about Williams' ability to make the lightweight limit prior to his bout with Dawson, an issue that would arise again in his bout with Jimmy Carter. There were several newspaper reports that wrote of Williams' fine for informing the press of a potential bribe of the judges he claimed he had heard about in a phone call. He was fined by the boxing commission for informing the press of the possible bribe before he had first informed the commission.

On January 17, 1949, Williams first defeated Johhny Bratton by a comfortable margin in the Arena in Philadelphia, Pennsylvania in a ten-round decision before a satisfied crowd of 8,000 fans. Williams had taken a two-month lay-off from his fight schedule to help heal a broken hand. The judges scored 6-2 and 7-3 for Bratton, while the referee scored a closer 5-4-1 decision. Bratton put up a defense, and even stunned Williams momentarily in the eighth with a blow to the jaw, but lacked the skills at 21 to defeat Williams. On January 20, 1950, before a crowd of 12,000 at Chicago Stadium, Williams won an eighth-round technical knockout against Bratton who was forced to leave the ring with a broken jaw. Bratton later claimed the injury took place in round three. Williams hammered his opponent particularly hard in the second and seventh rounds, and was comfortably ahead on points, losing only one of the eight rounds fought to Bratton. Bratton ended the bout by turning his back and signalling the referee to end the fight. After returning to boxing, Bratton would briefly take the NBA World Welterweight Championship in March 1951, holding it only two months.

==== Loss of World Lightweight Title against Jimmy Carter, May 1951 ====
He held on to the crown until May 25, 1951, when he was stopped by Jimmy Carter in a fourteenth-round technical knockout at New York's Madison Square Garden. Williams had been sent to the canvas four times before the fight was called. Williams was down for a count of five and eight in the fifth. He was down for a count of four and then six in the fourteenth before the referee ended the fight. Williams believed that his trouble making weight had weakened him for the fight.

Williams, for part of his career, was managed by Frank "Blinky" Palermo, who later was suspected of having ties to organized crime. According to Williams, he was blackballed by the boxing managers guild when he sought to manage himself. Palermo informed him he could resolve his problems with the guild, and Williams agreed to let Palermo manage him. Williams testified before the Kefauver Commission that Palermo did not arrange for him to throw any fights, but that he shorted him his share of his purses. Nevertheless, Williams did claim to have taken a dive against Chuck Davey, a much hyped contender for the welterweight crown.

== Testifying before Congress, 1961 ==
In 1961 Williams testified before Congress on antitrust in boxing. In his testimony, Williams stated that all boxers are asked to take bribes and that he was boycotted as a result of trying to manage himself. He explained that he could not get a fight because he did not use a manager and that he could not book a fight until he found a manager from the manager's guild. He explained that he did not receive his share of his purse in two fights which included Jesse Flores in Yankee Stadium, for the lightweight title on September 23, 1948, and Beau Jack at Shibe Park in Philadelphia, on July 12, 1948, and September 23, 1948. In those fights the money owed him was $32,500 and $32,400. He testified he told the boxing association to temporarily hold on to the money for these two fights for tax purposes. Later when he asked for his money, he discovered that his shares of the profits had been taken by his manager, who claimed to have fallen on hard times and spent it. Williams still had to pay the taxes on his share of the profits, though he never received them.

He further testified that his manager was offered $30,000 for him to throw a championship fight against Freddy Dawson in Philadelphia on December 5, 1949, though he declined. He testified that ten minutes before the fight he heard the judges being told if he did not win by a knock out that the fight would go to Dawson. Williams won the fight and told the media afterwards that he had heard a rumor that the fight would be fixed to go to Dawson by decision of the judges if he did not win by a knockout. Williams believed that the Judges upon hearing that he called the media decided to not fix the fight by giving an unfair decision to Dawson. Nonetheless, Williams was fined $500 for his comments to the media.

Williams also recalled a fight against Kid Gavilán on January 28, 1949, at Madison Square Garden, in which he was offered $100,000 to throw the fight. Again, Ike Williams did not take the money, an action he regretted because he lost the fight even though a plurality of reporters in subsequent news stories that cover the fight believed he had won. This made Williams conclude that the judges may have also been influenced in this fight to vote for his opponent in the case of a points decision.

Williams also believed he lost his lightweight title in a bout with the boxer Jimmy Carter on May 25, 1951, in a bout where the judges were also influenced. He testified he was again offered to throw the fight, for a sum of $50,000. Again, Williams said he regretted not taking the money as he lost the fight in a similar fashion as before.

Williams testified he never took the money offered to him to fix fights because too many people were counting on him and that too many of his friends had bet their hard earned money on him.

== Death ==
Williams died on September 5, 1994, at his home in the Wilshire District of Los Angeles of natural causes.

== Professional boxing record ==
All information in this section is derived from BoxRec, unless otherwise stated.

=== Official record ===
157 fights	126 wins	24 losses
By knockout	61	6
By decision	65	18
Draws	4	
Newspaper decisions/draws	3	

All newspaper decisions are officially regarded as “no decision” bouts and are not counted in the win/loss/draw column

No.	Result	Record	Opponent	Type	Round	Date	Age	Location	Notes
157	Win	126–24–4 (3)	Beau Jack	RTD	8 (10)	Aug 12, 1955	32 years, 10 days	Bell Auditorium, Augusta, Georgia, U.S.	
156	Draw	125–24–4 (3)	Beau Jack	PTS	10	Apr 9, 1955	31 years, 250 days	Bell Auditorium, Augusta, Georgia, U.S.	
155	Loss	125–24–3 (3)	Rafael Lastre	UD	10	Jul 2, 1954	30 years, 334 days	Estadio Tropical, Havana, Cuba	
154	Loss	125–23–3 (3)	Jed Black	UD	10	Nov 9, 1953	30 years, 99 days	Coliseum, Fort Wayne, Indiana, U.S.	
153	Win	125–22–3 (3)	Dom Zimbardo	TKO	2 (8)	Sep 17, 1953	30 years, 46 days	Meadowbrook Bowl, Newark, New Jersey, U.S.	
152	Loss	124–22–3 (3)	Georgie Johnson	TKO	8 (10)	Jun 8, 1953	29 years, 310 days	Arena, Trenton, New Jersey, U.S.	
151	Win	124–21–3 (3)	Billy Andy	UD	10	May 9, 1953	29 years, 280 days	Erie, Pennsylvania, U.S.	
150	Win	123–21–3 (3)	Billy Andy	PTS	10	Apr 20, 1953	29 years, 261 days	Arena, Trenton, New Jersey, U.S.	
149	Win	122–21–3 (3)	Vic Cardell	UD	10	Mar 28, 1953	29 years, 238 days	Metropolitan Opera House, Philadelphia, Pennsylvania, U.S.	
148	Win	121–21–3 (3)	Claude Hammond	PTS	10	Mar 9, 1953	29 years, 219 days	Arena, Trenton, New Jersey, U.S.	
147	Loss	120–21–3 (3)	Carmen Basilio	UD	10	Jan 12, 1953	29 years, 163 days	War Memorial Auditorium, Syracuse, New York, U.S.	
146	Win	120–20–3 (3)	Pat Manzi	TKO	7 (10)	Nov 24, 1952	29 years, 114 days	War Memorial Auditorium, Syracuse, New York, U.S.	
145	Loss	119–20–3 (3)	Chuck Davey	TKO	5 (10)	Mar 26, 1952	28 years, 237 days	Chicago Stadium, Chicago, U.S.	
144	Win	119–19–3 (3)	Johnny Cunningham	KO	5 (10)	Mar 17, 1952	28 years, 228 days	Coliseum, Baltimore, Maryland, U.S.	
143	Loss	118–19–3 (3)	Gil Turner	TKO	10 (10)	Sep 10, 1951	28 years, 39 days	Shibe Park, Philadelphia, Pennsylvania, U.S.	
142	Loss	118–18–3 (3)	Don Williams	PTS	10	Aug 2, 1951	28 years, 0 days	Worcester, Massachusetts, U.S.	
141	Loss	118–17–3 (3)	Jimmy Carter	TKO	14 (15)	May 25, 1951	27 years, 296 days	Madison Square Garden, New York City, New York, U.S.	Lost NYSAC, NBA, and The Ring lightweight titles
140	Win	118–16–3 (3)	Fitzie Pruden	UD	10	Apr 11, 1951	27 years, 252 days	Chicago Stadium, Chicago, Illinois, U.S.	
139	Win	117–16–3 (3)	Beau Jack	SD	10	Mar 5, 1951	27 years, 215 days	Rhode Island Auditorium, Providence, Rhode Island, U.S.	
138	Loss	116–16–3 (3)	Joe Miceli	UD	10	Feb 19, 1951	27 years, 201 days	Arena, Philadelphia, Pennsylvania, U.S.	
137	Win	116–15–3 (3)	Vic Cardell	RTD	8 (10)	Jan 31, 1951	27 years, 182 days	Olympia Stadium, Detroit, Michigan, U.S.	
136	Win	115–15–3 (3)	Ralph Zannelli	KO	5 (10)	Jan 22, 1951	27 years, 173 days	Rhode Island Auditorium, Providence, Rhode Island, U.S.	
135	Win	114–15–3 (3)	José María Gatica	KO	1 (10)	Jan 5, 1951	27 years, 156 days	Madison Square Garden, New York City, New York, U.S.	
134	Win	113–15–3 (3)	Rudy Cruz	UD	10	Dec 18, 1950	27 years, 138 days	Arena, Philadelphia, Pennsylvania, U.S.	
133	Win	112–15–3 (3)	Dave Marsh	RTD	8 (10)	Dec 12, 1950	27 years, 132 days	Armory, Akron, Ohio, U.S.	
132	Win	111–15–3 (3)	Joe Miceli	SD	10	Nov 23, 1950	27 years, 113 days	Arena, Milwaukee, Wisconsin, U.S.	
131	Loss	110–15–3 (3)	Joe Miceli	UD	10	Oct 2, 1950	27 years, 61 days	Arena, Milwaukee, Wisconsin, U.S.	
130	Win	110–14–3 (3)	Charley Salas	SD	10	Sep 26, 1950	27 years, 55 days	Griffith Stadium, Washington, District of Columbia, U.S.	
129	Loss	109–14–3 (3)	Charley Salas	UD	10	Aug 7, 1950	27 years, 5 days	Griffith Stadium, Washington, District of Columbia, U.S.	
128	Loss	109–13–3 (3)	George Costner	UD	10	Jul 12, 1950	26 years, 344 days	Shibe Park, Philadelphia, Pennsylvania, U.S.	
127	Win	109–12–3 (3)	Lester Felton	UD	10	Jun 2, 1950	26 years, 304 days	Olympia Stadium, Detroit, Michigan, U.S.	
126	Win	108–12–3 (3)	John L Davis	SD	10	Feb 27, 1950	26 years, 209 days	Civic Auditorium, Seattle, Washington, U.S.	
125	Win	107–12–3 (3)	Sonny Boy West	KO	8 (10)	Feb 17, 1950	26 years, 199 days	Madison Square Garden, New York City, New York, U.S.	
124	Win	106–12–3 (3)	Johnny Bratton	TKO	8 (10)	Jan 20, 1950	26 years, 171 days	Valley Forge General Hospital, Phoenixville, Pennsylvania, U.S.	
123	Win	105–12–3 (3)	Jimmy Taylor	UD	6	Dec 20, 1949	26 years, 140 days	Valley Forge General Hospital, Phoenixville, Pennsylvania, U.S.	
122	Win	104–12–3 (3)	Freddie Dawson	UD	15	Dec 5, 1949	26 years, 125 days	Convention Hall, Philadelphia, Pennsylvania, U.S.	Retained NYSAC, NBA, and The Ring lightweight titles
121	Win	103–12–3 (3)	Jean Walzack	UD	10	Nov 14, 1949	26 years, 104 days	Arena, Philadelphia, Pennsylvania, U.S.	
120	Win	102–12–3 (3)	Al Mobley	PTS	10	Oct 24, 1949	26 years, 83 days	Arena, Trenton, New Jersey, U.S.	
119	Win	101–12–3 (3)	Doug Ratford	UD	10	Sep 30, 1949	26 years, 59 days	Arena, Philadelphia, Pennsylvania, U.S.	
118	Win	100–12–3 (3)	Benny Walker	UD	10	Aug 3, 1949	26 years, 1 day	Auditorium, Oakland, California, U.S.	
117	Win	99–12–3 (3)	Enrique Bolanos	TKO	4 (15)	Jul 21, 1949	25 years, 353 days	Wrigley Field, Los Angeles, California, U.S.	Retained NYSAC, NBA, and The Ring lightweight titles
116	Win	98–12–3 (3)	Irvin Steen	UD	10	Jun 21, 1949	25 years, 323 days	Olympic Auditorium, Los Angeles, California, U.S.	
115	Win	97–12–3 (3)	Vince Turpin	TKO	6 (10)	Apr 22, 1949	25 years, 263 days	Arena, Cleveland, Ohio, U.S.	
114	Loss	96–12–3 (3)	Kid Gavilán	UD	10	Apr 1, 1949	25 years, 242 days	Madison Square Garden, New York City, New York, U.S.	
113	Loss	96–11–3 (3)	Kid Gavilán	MD	10	Jan 28, 1949	25 years, 210 days	Madison Square Garden, New York City, New York, U.S.	
112	Win	96–10–3 (3)	Johnny Bratton	UD	10	Jan 17, 1949	25 years, 168 days	Arena, Philadelphia, Pennsylvania, U.S.	
111	Win	95–10–3 (3)	Billy Nixon	TKO	4 (8)	Nov 18, 1948	25 years, 108 days	Metropolitan Opera House, Philadelphia, Pennsylvania, U.S.	
110	Win	94–10–3 (3)	Buddy Garcia	TKO	1 (10)	Nov 8, 1948	25 years, 98 days	Arena, Philadelphia, Pennsylvania, U.S.	
109	Win	93–10–3 (3)	Jesse Flores	TKO	10 (15)	Sep 23, 1948	25 years, 52 days	Yankee Stadium, New York City, New York, U.S.	Retained NYSAC, NBA, and The Ring lightweight titles
108	Win	92–10–3 (3)	Beau Jack	TKO	6 (15)	Jul 12, 1948	24 years, 345 days	Shibe Park, Philadelphia, Pennsylvania, U.S.	Retained NYSAC, NBA, and The Ring lightweight titles
107	Win	91–10–3 (3)	Enrique Bolanos	SD	15	May 25, 1948	24 years, 297 days	Wrigley Field, Los Angeles, California, U.S.	Retained NYSAC, NBA, and The Ring lightweight titles
106	Win	90–10–3 (3)	Rudy Cruz	UD	10	May 5, 1948	24 years, 277 days	Auditorium, Oakland, California, U.S.	
105	Win	89–10–3 (3)	Kid Gavilán	UD	10	Feb 27, 1948	24 years, 209 days	Madison Square Garden, New York City, New York, U.S.	
104	Win	88–10–3 (3)	Livio Minelli	UD	10	Feb 9, 1948	24 years, 191 days	Arena, Philadelphia, Pennsylvania, U.S.	
103	Win	87–10–3 (3)	Freddie Dawson	MD	10	Jan 26, 1948	24 years, 177 days	Arena, Philadelphia, Pennsylvania, U.S.	
102	Win	86–10–3 (3)	Doug Carter	PTS	10	Jan 13, 1948	24 years, 164 days	114th Infantry Armory, Camden, New Jersey, U.S.	
101	Win	85–10–3 (3)	Tony Pellone	UD	10	Dec 12, 1947	24 years, 132 days	Madison Square Garden, New York City, New York, U.S.	
100	Win	84–10–3 (3)	Talmadge Bussey	TKO	9 (10)	Oct 10, 1947	24 years, 69 days	Olympia Stadium, Detroit, Michigan, U.S.	
99	Win	83–10–3 (3)	Doll Rafferty	KO	4 (10)	Sep 29, 1947	24 years, 58 days	Convention Hall, Philadelphia, Pennsylvania, U.S.	
98	Win	82–10–3 (3)	Bob Montgomery	TKO	6 (15)	Aug 4, 1947	24 years, 2 days	Municipal Stadium, Philadelphia, Pennsylvania, U.S.	Retained NBA lightweight title; Won NYSAC and vacant The Ring lightweight titles
97	Win	81–10–3 (3)	Tippy Larkin	KO	4 (10)	Jun 20, 1947	23 years, 322 days	Madison Square Garden, New York City, New York, U.S.	
96	Win	80–10–3 (3)	Juste Fontaine	TKO	4 (10)	May 26, 1947	23 years, 267 days	Arena, Philadelphia, Pennsylvania, U.S.	
95	Win	79–10–3 (3)	Ralph Zannelli	UD	10	May 9, 1947	23 years, 280 days	Boston Garden, Boston, Massachusetts, U.S.	
94	Win	78–10–3 (3)	Willie Russell	UD	10	Apr 25, 1947	23 years, 266 days	Fairgrounds Coliseum, Columbus, Ohio, U.S.	
93	Win	77–10–3 (3)	Frankie Conti	TKO	7 (10)	Apr 14, 1947	23 years, 255 days	Little Palestra, Allentown, Pennsylvania, U.S.	
92	Loss	76–10–3 (3)	Gene Burton	UD	10	Jan 27, 1947	23 years, 178 days	Coliseum, Chicago, Illinois, U.S.	
91	Win	76–9–3 (3)	Ronnie James	KO	9 (15)	Sep 4, 1946	23 years, 33 days	Ninian Park, Cardiff, Wales	Retained NBA lightweight title
90	Win	75–9–3 (3)	Ivan Christie	KO	2 (10)	Aug 6, 1946	23 years, 4 days	Crystal Arena, Norwalk, Connecticut, U.S.	
89	Win	74–9–3 (3)	Bobby Ruffin	TKO	5 (10)	Jun 12, 1946	22 years, 314 days	Ebbets Field, New York City, New York, U.S.	
88	Win	73–9–3 (3)	Enrique Bolanos	TKO	8 (15)	Apr 30, 1946	22 years, 271 days	Wrigley Field, Los Angeles, California, U.S.	Retained NBA lightweight title
87	Win	72–9–3 (3)	Eddie Giosa	RTD	1 (10)	Apr 8, 1946	22 years, 249 days	Arena, Philadelphia, Pennsylvania, U.S.	
86	Win	71–9–3 (3)	Eddie Giosa	RTD	4 (10)	Mar 11, 1946	22 years, 221 days	Arena, Philadelphia, Pennsylvania, U.S.	
85	Win	70–9–3 (3)	Ace Miller	UD	10	Feb 22, 1946	22 years, 204 days	Olympia Stadium, Detroit, Michigan, U.S.	
84	Win	69–9–3 (3)	Cleo Shans	PTS	10	Feb 14, 1946	22 years, 196 days	Armory, Orange, New Jersey, U.S.	
83	Draw	68–9–3 (3)	Freddie Dawson	MD	10	Jan 28, 1946	22 years, 179 days	Arena, Philadelphia, Pennsylvania, U.S.	
82	Win	68–9–2 (3)	Johnny Bratton	PTS	10	Jan 20, 1946	22 years, 171 days	Coliseum Arena, New Orleans, Louisiana, U.S.	
81	Win	67–9–2 (3)	Charlie "Petey" Smith	PTS	10	Jan 8, 1946	22 years, 159 days	Arena, Trenton, New Jersey, U.S.	
80	Draw	66–9–2 (3)	Wesley Mouzon	MD	10	Nov 26, 1945	22 years, 116 days	Arena, Philadelphia, Pennsylvania, U.S.	
79	Loss	66–9–1 (3)	Sammy Angott	TKO	6 (10)	Sep 19, 1945	22 years, 48 days	Forbes Field, Pittsburgh, Pennsylvania, U.S.	
78	Win	66–8–1 (3)	Nick Moran	UD	10	Sep 7, 1945	22 years, 36 days	Madison Square Garden, New York City, New York, U.S.	
77	Win	65–8–1 (3)	Gene Burton	UD	10	Aug 28, 1945	22 years, 26 days	Arena Stadium, Philadelphia, Pennsylvania, U.S.	
76	Win	64–8–1 (3)	Charlie "Petey" Smith	PTS	10	Aug 14, 1945	22 years, 12 days	Roosevelt Stadium, Union City, New Jersey, U.S.	
75	Loss	63–8–1 (3)	Willie Joyce	SD	10	Jun 8, 1945	21 years, 310 days	Madison Square Garden, New York City, New York, U.S.	
74	Win	63–7–1 (3)	Juan Zurita	TKO	2 (15)	Apr 18, 1945	21 years, 259 days	El Toreo de Cuatro Caminos, Mexico City, Distrito Federal, Mexico	Won NBA lightweight title
73	Win	62–7–1 (3)	Dorsey Lay	KO	3 (10)	Mar 26, 1945	21 years, 236 days	Arena, Philadelphia, Pennsylvania, U.S.	
72	Loss	61–7–1 (3)	Willie Joyce	UD	12	Mar 2, 1945	21 years, 212 days	Madison Square Garden, New York City, New York, U.S.	
71	Win	61–6–1 (3)	Maxie Berger	KO	4 (10)	Jan 22, 1945	21 years, 173 days	Arena, Philadelphia, Pennsylvania, U.S.	
70	Win	60–6–1 (3)	Willie Joyce	UD	12	Jan 8, 1945	21 years, 159 days	Convention Hall, Philadelphia, Pennsylvania, U.S.	
69	Win	59–6–1 (3)	Dave Castilloux	TKO	5 (10)	Dec 11, 1944	21 years, 131 days	Memorial Auditorium, Buffalo, New York, U.S.	
68	Win	58–6–1 (3)	Lulu Costantino	UD	10	Dec 5, 1944	21 years, 125 days	Arena, Cleveland, Ohio, U.S.	
67	Loss	57–6–1 (3)	Willie Joyce	SD	10	Nov 13, 1944	21 years, 103 days	Arena, Philadelphia, Pennsylvania, U.S.	
66	Win	57–5–1 (3)	Ruby Garcia	TKO	7 (10)	Nov 2, 1944	21 years, 92 days	Carlin's Park, Baltimore, Maryland, U.S.	
65	Win	56–5–1 (3)	Johnny Green	KO	2 (10)	Oct 18, 1944	21 years, 77 days	Memorial Auditorium, Buffalo, New York, U.S.	
64	Win	55–5–1 (3)	Freddie Dawson	KO	4 (10)	Sep 19, 1944	21 years, 48 days	Arena, Pennsylvania, U.S.	
63	Win	54–5–1 (3)	Sammy Angott	SD	10	Sep 6, 1944	21 years, 35 days	Shibe Park, Philadelphia, Pennsylvania, U.S.	
62	Win	53–5–1 (3)	Jimmy Hatcher	UD	10	Aug 29, 1944	21 years, 27 days	Griffith Stadium, Washington, District of Columbia, U.S.	
61	Win	52–5–1 (3)	Julie Kogon	UD	10	Jul 20, 1944	20 years, 353 days	Madison Square Garden, New York City, New York, U.S.	
60	Win	51–5–1 (3)	Joey Pirrone	KO	1 (10)	Jul 10, 1944	20 years, 343 days	Arena Stadium, Philadelphia, Pennsylvania, U.S.	
59	Win	50–5–1 (3)	Cleo Shans	TKO	10 (10)	Jun 23, 1944	20 years, 326 days	Madison Square Garden, New York City, New York, U.S.	
58	Win	49–5–1 (3)	Sammy Angott	SD	10	Jun 6, 1944	20 years, 309 days	Shibe Park, Philadelphia, Pennsylvania, U.S.	
57	Win	48–5–1 (3)	Slugger White	UD	10	May 16, 1944	20 years, 288 days	Convention Hall, Philadelphia, Pennsylvania, U.S.	
56	Win	47–5–1 (3)	Mike Delia	KO	1 (10)	Apr 17, 1944	20 years, 259 days	Arena, Philadelphia, Pennsylvania, U.S.	
55	Win	46–5–1 (3)	Leroy Saunders	KO	5 (10)	Apr 10, 1944	20 years, 282 days	Valley Arena, Holyoke, Massachusetts, U.S.	
54	Win	45–5–1 (3)	Joey Peralta	TKO	9 (10)	Mar 27, 1944	20 years, 238 days	Arena, Philadelphia, Pennsylvania, U.S.	
53	Win	44–5–1 (3)	Leo Francis	PTS	8	Mar 13, 1944	20 years, 224 days	Arena, Trenton, New Jersey, U.S.	
52	Win	43–5–1 (3)	Ellis Phillips	KO	1 (10)	Feb 28, 1944	20 years, 210 days	Arena, Philadelphia, Pennsylvania, U.S.	
51	Loss	42–5–1 (3)	Bob Montgomery	KO	12 (12)	Jan 25, 1944	20 years, 176 days	Convention Hall, Philadelphia, Pennsylvania, U.S.	
50	Win	42–4–1 (3)	Mayon Padlo	UD	10	Dec 13, 1943	20 years, 133 days	Arena, Philadelphia, Pennsylvania, U.S.	
49	Win	41–4–1 (3)	Willie Cheatum	PTS	8	Nov 29, 1943	20 years, 119 days	Stanley Arena, New Britain, Connecticut, U.S.	
48	Win	40–4–1 (3)	Johnny Hutchinson	KO	3 (10)	Nov 8, 1943	20 years, 98 days	Arena, Philadelphia, Pennsylvania, U.S.	
47	Win	39–4–1 (3)	Gene Johnson	PTS	10	Oct 29, 1943	20 years, 88 days	Coliseum Arena, New Orleans, Louisiana, U.S.	
46	Win	38–4–1 (3)	Eddie Perry	KO	2 (10)	Oct 22, 1943	20 years, 81 days	Coliseum Arena, New Orleans, Louisiana, U.S.	
45	Win	37–4–1 (3)	Lefty LaChance	KO	4 (10)	Oct 1, 1943	20 years, 60 days	Mechanics Building, Boston, Massachusetts, U.S.	
44	Win	36–4–1 (3)	Jerry Moore	PTS	10	Sep 13, 1943	20 years, 42 days	Century Stadium, West Springfield, Massachusetts, U.S.	
43	Win	35–4–1 (3)	Johnny Bellus	PTS	10	Aug 31, 1943	20 years, 29 days	Auditorium Outdoor Arena, Hartford, Connecticut, U.S.	
42	Win	34–4–1 (3)	Tommy Jessup	TKO	5 (10)	Aug 24, 1943	20 years, 22 days	Auditorium Outdoor Arena, Hartford, Connecticut, U.S.	
41	Win	33–4–1 (3)	Jimmy Hatcher	TKO	6 (10)	Jul 19, 1943	19 years, 351 days	Shibe Park, Philadelphia, Pennsylvania, U.S.	
40	Win	32–4–1 (3)	Ray Brown	PTS	10	May 17, 1943	19 years, 288 days	Arena, Philadelphia, Pennsylvania, U.S.	
39	Win	31–4–1 (3)	Lefty LaChance	UD	8	May 7, 1943	19 years, 278 days	Boston Garden, Boston, Massachusetts, U.S.	
38	Win	30–4–1 (3)	Joe Genovese	TKO	4 (8)	Apr 21, 1943	19 years, 262 days	Arena, Cleveland, Ohio, U.S.	
37	Win	29–4–1 (3)	Ruby Garcia	UD	8	Apr 5, 1943	19 years, 246 days	Arena, Philadelphia, Pennsylvania, U.S.	
36	Win	28–4–1 (3)	Rudy Giscombe	TKO	3 (6)	Apr 2, 1943	19 years, 243 days	Madison Square Garden, New York City, New York, U.S.	
35	Win	27–4–1 (3)	Bill Speary	TKO	2 (10)	Mar 8, 1943	19 years, 218 days	Arena, Philadelphia, Pennsylvania, U.S.	
34	Win	26–4–1 (3)	Bobby McQuillar	KO	3 (6)	Feb 23, 1943	19 years, 205 days	Arena, Cleveland, Ohio, U.S.	
33	Win	25–4–1 (3)	Sammy Daniels	KO	2 (6)	Feb 22, 1943	19 years, 204 days	Convention Hall, Philadelphia, Pennsylvania, U.S.	
32	Win	24–4–1 (3)	Jerry Moore	PTS	6	Jan 29, 1943	19 years, 180 days	Madison Square Garden, New York City, New York, U.S.	
31	Win	23–4–1 (3)	Sammy Daniels	PTS	6	Dec 21, 1942	19 years, 141 days	Coliseum, Baltimore, Maryland, U.S.	
30	Win	22–4–1 (3)	Bobby Gunther	PTS	8	Dec 7, 1942	19 years, 127 days	Arena, Trenton, New Jersey, U.S.	
29	Win	21–4–1 (3)	Gene Burton	KO	4 (6)	Oct 10, 1942	19 years, 69 days	Westchester County Center, White Plains, New York, U.S.	
28	Win	20–4–1 (3)	Charley "Dixie" Davis	PTS	8	Sep 10, 1942	19 years, 39 days	Twin City Bowl, Elizabeth, New Jersey, U.S.	
27	Win	19–4–1 (3)	Ruby Garcia	PTS	8	Aug 13, 1942	19 years, 11 days	Waltz Dream Arena, Atlantic City, New Jersey, U.S.	
26	Win	18–4–1 (3)	Tony Maglione	KO	3 (10)	Jul 29, 1942	18 years, 361 days	Dunn Field, Trenton, New Jersey, U.S.	
25	Win	17–4–1 (3)	Ivan Christie	KO	5 (6)	Jun 29, 1942	18 years, 331 days	Meadowbrook Bowl, Newark, New Jersey, U.S.	
24	Win	16–4–1 (3)	George "Dusty" Brown	TKO	3 (6)	Jun 15, 1942	18 years, 317 days	St. Ann's Open Air Arena, Bristol, Pennsylvania, U.S.	
23	Win	15–4–1 (3)	Abie Kaufman	PTS	8	May 7, 1942	18 years, 278 days	Waltz Dream Arena, Atlantic City, New Jersey, U.S.	
22	Win	14–4–1 (3)	Willie Roache	PTS	8	Apr 24, 1942	18 years, 265 days	Raritan Auditorium, Perth Amboy, New Jersey, U.S.	
21	Win	13–4–1 (3)	Angelo Pantellas	TKO	5 (8)	Apr 9, 1942	18 years, 250 days	Waltz Dream Arena, Atlantic City, New Jersey, U.S.	
20	Win	12–4–1 (3)	Pedro Firpo	PTS	8	Mar 26, 1942	18 years, 236 days	Waltz Dream Arena, Atlantic City, New Jersey, U.S.	
19	Win	11–4–1 (3)	Eddie Dowl	PTS	6	Jan 16, 1942	18 years, 167 days	Arena, Trenton, New Jersey, U.S.	
18	Win	10–4–1 (3)	Eddie Dowl	PTS	6	Dec 16, 1941	18 years, 136 days	Raritan Auditorium, Perth Amboy, New Jersey, U.S.	
17	Win	9–4–1 (3)	Vince Delia	PTS	6	Nov 3, 1941	18 years, 93 days	Arena, Trenton, New Jersey, U.S.	
16	Draw	8–4–1 (3)	Benny Williams	NWS	6	Oct 27, 1941	18 years, 86 days	Laurel Garden, Newark, New Jersey, U.S.	
15	Loss	8–4–1 (2)	Freddie Archer	PTS	8	Oct 1, 1941	18 years, 60 days	Raritan Auditorium, Perth Amboy, New Jersey, U.S.	
14	Win	8–3–1 (2)	Hugh Civatte	TKO	3 (6)	Apr 14, 1941	17 years, 255 days	Arena, Trenton, New Jersey, U.S.	
13	Win	7–3–1 (2)	Johnny Rudolph	PTS	6	Apr 9, 1941	17 years, 250 days	Raritan Auditorium, Perth Amboy, New Jersey, U.S.	
12	Win	6–3–1 (2)	Joe Genovese	PTS	5	Mar 19, 1941	17 years, 229 days	Raritan Auditorium, Perth Amboy, New Jersey, U.S.	
11	Loss	5–3–1 (2)	Joey Zodda	PTS	6	Mar 5, 1941	17 years, 215 days	Raritan Auditorium, Perth Amboy, New Jersey, U.S.	
10	Win	5–2–1 (2)	Carl Zullo	TKO	2 (6)	Feb 19, 1941	17 years, 201 days	Raritan Auditorium, Perth Amboy, New Jersey, U.S.	
9	Win	4–2–1 (2)	Tommy Fontana	PTS	8	Jan 6, 1941	17 years, 157 days	Arena, Trenton, New Jersey, U.S.	
8	Loss	3–2–1 (2)	Tony Maglione	PTS	8	Nov 11, 1940	17 years, 101 days	Arena, Trenton, New Jersey, U.S.	
7	Win	3–1–1 (2)	Pete Kelly	KO	2 (6)	Sep 30, 1940	17 years, 59 days	Arena, Trenton, New Jersey, U.S.	
6	Win	2–1–1 (2)	Joe Romero	TKO	2 (8)	Jul 19, 1940	16 years, 352 days	Morris County Arena, Mount Freedom, New Jersey, U.S.	
5	Win	1–1–1 (2)	Billy Hildebrand	TKO	6 (8)	Jun 14, 1940	16 years, 317 days	Morris County Arena, Mount Freedom, New Jersey, U.S.	
4	Loss	0–1–1 (2)	Billy Hildebrand	PTS	6	May 10, 1940	16 years, 282 days	Morristown, New Jersey, U.S.	
3	Draw	0–0–1 (2)	Patsy Gall	PTS	6	Apr 1, 1940	16 years, 243 days	Feeley Hall, Hazleton, Pennsylvania, U.S.	
2	Win	0–0 (2)	Leroy Born	NWS	4	Mar 29, 1940	16 years, 240 days	Masonic Hall, Highland Park, New Jersey, U.S.	
1	Win	0–0 (1)	Carmine Fotti	NWS	4	Mar 15, 1940	16 years, 226 days	Masonic Hall, Highland Park, New Jersey, U.S.	

=== Unofficial record ===
156 fights	128 wins	24 losses
By knockout	61	6
By decision	67	18
Draws	4	

Record with the inclusion of newspaper decisions in the win/loss/draw column.

No.	Result	Record	Opponent	Type	Round	Date	Age	Location	Notes
157	Win	128–24–5	Beau Jack	RTD	8 (10)	Aug 12, 1955	32 years, 10 days	Bell Auditorium, Augusta, Georgia, U.S.	
156	Draw	127–24–5	Beau Jack	PTS	10	Apr 9, 1955	31 years, 250 days	Bell Auditorium, Augusta, Georgia, U.S.	
155	Loss	127–24–4	Rafael Lastre	UD	10	Jul 2, 1954	30 years, 334 days	Estadio Tropical, Havana, Cuba	
154	Loss	127–23–4	Jed Black	UD	10	Nov 9, 1953	30 years, 99 days	Coliseum, Fort Wayne, Indiana, U.S.	
153	Win	127–22–4	Dom Zimbardo	TKO	2 (8)	Sep 17, 1953	30 years, 46 days	Meadowbrook Bowl, Newark, New Jersey, U.S.	
152	Loss	126–22–4	Georgie Johnson	TKO	8 (10)	Jun 8, 1953	29 years, 310 days	Arena, Trenton, New Jersey, U.S.	
151	Win	126–21–4	Billy Andy	UD	10	May 9, 1953	29 years, 280 days	Erie, Pennsylvania, U.S.	
150	Win	125–21–4	Billy Andy	PTS	10	Apr 20, 1953	29 years, 261 days	Arena, Trenton, New Jersey, U.S.	
149	Win	124–21–4	Vic Cardell	UD	10	Mar 28, 1953	29 years, 238 days	Metropolitan Opera House, Philadelphia, Pennsylvania, U.S.	
148	Win	123–21–4	Claude Hammond	PTS	10	Mar 9, 1953	29 years, 219 days	Arena, Trenton, New Jersey, U.S.	
147	Loss	122–21–4	Carmen Basilio	UD	10	Jan 12, 1953	29 years, 163 days	War Memorial Auditorium, Syracuse, New York, U.S.	
146	Win	122–20–4	Pat Manzi	TKO	7 (10)	Nov 24, 1952	29 years, 114 days	War Memorial Auditorium, Syracuse, New York, U.S.	
145	Loss	121–20–4	Chuck Davey	TKO	5 (10)	Mar 26, 1952	28 years, 237 days	Chicago Stadium, Chicago, U.S.	
144	Win	121–19–4	Johnny Cunningham	KO	5 (10)	Mar 17, 1952	28 years, 228 days	Coliseum, Baltimore, Maryland, U.S.	
143	Loss	120–19–4	Gil Turner	TKO	10 (10)	Sep 10, 1951	28 years, 39 days	Shibe Park, Philadelphia, Pennsylvania, U.S.	
142	Loss	120–18–4	Don Williams	PTS	10	Aug 2, 1951	28 years, 0 days	Worcester, Massachusetts, U.S.	
141	Loss	120–17–4	Jimmy Carter	TKO	14 (15)	May 25, 1951	27 years, 296 days	Madison Square Garden, New York City, New York, U.S.	Lost NYSAC, NBA, and The Ring lightweight titles
140	Win	120–16–4	Fitzie Pruden	UD	10	Apr 11, 1951	27 years, 252 days	Chicago Stadium, Chicago, Illinois, U.S.	
139	Win	119–16–4	Beau Jack	SD	10	Mar 5, 1951	27 years, 215 days	Rhode Island Auditorium, Providence, Rhode Island, U.S.	
138	Loss	118–16–4	Joe Miceli	UD	10	Feb 19, 1951	27 years, 201 days	Arena, Philadelphia, Pennsylvania, U.S.	
137	Win	118–15–4	Vic Cardell	RTD	8 (10)	Jan 31, 1951	27 years, 182 days	Olympia Stadium, Detroit, Michigan, U.S.	
136	Win	117–15–4	Ralph Zannelli	KO	5 (10)	Jan 22, 1951	27 years, 173 days	Rhode Island Auditorium, Providence, Rhode Island, U.S.	
135	Win	116–15–4	José María Gatica	KO	1 (10)	Jan 5, 1951	27 years, 156 days	Madison Square Garden, New York City, New York, U.S.	
134	Win	115–15–4	Rudy Cruz	UD	10	Dec 18, 1950	27 years, 138 days	Arena, Philadelphia, Pennsylvania, U.S.	
133	Win	114–15–4	Dave Marsh	RTD	8 (10)	Dec 12, 1950	27 years, 132 days	Armory, Akron, Ohio, U.S.	
132	Win	113–15–4	Joe Miceli	SD	10	Nov 23, 1950	27 years, 113 days	Arena, Milwaukee, Wisconsin, U.S.	
131	Loss	112–15–4	Joe Miceli	UD	10	Oct 2, 1950	27 years, 61 days	Arena, Milwaukee, Wisconsin, U.S.	
130	Win	112–14–4	Charley Salas	SD	10	Sep 26, 1950	27 years, 55 days	Griffith Stadium, Washington, District of Columbia, U.S.	
129	Loss	111–14–4	Charley Salas	UD	10	Aug 7, 1950	27 years, 5 days	Griffith Stadium, Washington, District of Columbia, U.S.	
128	Loss	111–13–4	George Costner	UD	10	Jul 12, 1950	26 years, 344 days	Shibe Park, Philadelphia, Pennsylvania, U.S.	
127	Win	111–12–4	Lester Felton	UD	10	Jun 2, 1950	26 years, 304 days	Olympia Stadium, Detroit, Michigan, U.S.	
126	Win	110–12–4	John L Davis	SD	10	Feb 27, 1950	26 years, 209 days	Civic Auditorium, Seattle, Washington, U.S.	
125	Win	109–12–4	Sonny Boy West	KO	8 (10)	Feb 17, 1950	26 years, 199 days	Madison Square Garden, New York City, New York, U.S.	
124	Win	108–12–4	Johnny Bratton	TKO	8 (10)	Jan 20, 1950	26 years, 171 days	Valley Forge General Hospital, Phoenixville, Pennsylvania, U.S.	
123	Win	107–12–4	Jimmy Taylor	UD	6	Dec 20, 1949	26 years, 140 days	Valley Forge General Hospital, Phoenixville, Pennsylvania, U.S.	
122	Win	106–12–4	Freddie Dawson	UD	15	Dec 5, 1949	26 years, 125 days	Convention Hall, Philadelphia, Pennsylvania, U.S.	Retained NYSAC, NBA, and The Ring lightweight titles
121	Win	105–12–4	Jean Walzack	UD	10	Nov 14, 1949	26 years, 104 days	Arena, Philadelphia, Pennsylvania, U.S.	
120	Win	104–12–4	Al Mobley	PTS	10	Oct 24, 1949	26 years, 83 days	Arena, Trenton, New Jersey, U.S.	
119	Win	103–12–4	Doug Ratford	UD	10	Sep 30, 1949	26 years, 59 days	Arena, Philadelphia, Pennsylvania, U.S.	
118	Win	102–12–4	Benny Walker	UD	10	Aug 3, 1949	26 years, 1 day	Auditorium, Oakland, California, U.S.	
117	Win	101–12–4	Enrique Bolanos	TKO	4 (15)	Jul 21, 1949	25 years, 353 days	Wrigley Field, Los Angeles, California, U.S.	Retained NYSAC, NBA, and The Ring lightweight titles
116	Win	100–12–4	Irvin Steen	UD	10	Jun 21, 1949	25 years, 323 days	Olympic Auditorium, Los Angeles, California, U.S.	
115	Win	99–12–4	Vince Turpin	TKO	6 (10)	Apr 22, 1949	25 years, 263 days	Arena, Cleveland, Ohio, U.S.	
114	Loss	98–12–4	Kid Gavilán	UD	10	Apr 1, 1949	25 years, 242 days	Madison Square Garden, New York City, New York, U.S.	
113	Loss	98–11–4	Kid Gavilán	MD	10	Jan 28, 1949	25 years, 210 days	Madison Square Garden, New York City, New York, U.S.	
112	Win	98–10–4	Johnny Bratton	UD	10	Jan 17, 1949	25 years, 168 days	Arena, Philadelphia, Pennsylvania, U.S.	
111	Win	97–10–4	Billy Nixon	TKO	4 (8)	Nov 18, 1948	25 years, 108 days	Metropolitan Opera House, Philadelphia, Pennsylvania, U.S.	
110	Win	96–10–4	Buddy Garcia	TKO	1 (10)	Nov 8, 1948	25 years, 98 days	Arena, Philadelphia, Pennsylvania, U.S.	
109	Win	95–10–4	Jesse Flores	TKO	10 (15)	Sep 23, 1948	25 years, 52 days	Yankee Stadium, New York City, New York, U.S.	Retained NYSAC, NBA, and The Ring lightweight titles
108	Win	94–10–4	Beau Jack	TKO	6 (15)	Jul 12, 1948	24 years, 345 days	Shibe Park, Philadelphia, Pennsylvania, U.S.	Retained NYSAC, NBA, and The Ring lightweight titles
107	Win	93–10–4	Enrique Bolanos	SD	15	May 25, 1948	24 years, 297 days	Wrigley Field, Los Angeles, California, U.S.	Retained NYSAC, NBA, and The Ring lightweight titles
106	Win	92–10–4	Rudy Cruz	UD	10	May 5, 1948	24 years, 277 days	Auditorium, Oakland, California, U.S.	
105	Win	91–10–4	Kid Gavilán	UD	10	Feb 27, 1948	24 years, 209 days	Madison Square Garden, New York City, New York, U.S.	
104	Win	90–10–4	Livio Minelli	UD	10	Feb 9, 1948	24 years, 191 days	Arena, Philadelphia, Pennsylvania, U.S.	
103	Win	89–10–4	Freddie Dawson	MD	10	Jan 26, 1948	24 years, 177 days	Arena, Philadelphia, Pennsylvania, U.S.	
102	Win	88–10–4	Doug Carter	PTS	10	Jan 13, 1948	24 years, 164 days	114th Infantry Armory, Camden, New Jersey, U.S.	
101	Win	87–10–4	Tony Pellone	UD	10	Dec 12, 1947	24 years, 132 days	Madison Square Garden, New York City, New York, U.S.	
100	Win	86–10–4	Talmadge Bussey	TKO	9 (10)	Oct 10, 1947	24 years, 69 days	Olympia Stadium, Detroit, Michigan, U.S.	
99	Win	85–10–4	Doll Rafferty	KO	4 (10)	Sep 29, 1947	24 years, 58 days	Convention Hall, Philadelphia, Pennsylvania, U.S.	
98	Win	84–10–4	Bob Montgomery	TKO	6 (15)	Aug 4, 1947	24 years, 2 days	Municipal Stadium, Philadelphia, Pennsylvania, U.S.	Retained NBA lightweight title; Won NYSAC and vacant The Ring lightweight titles
97	Win	83–10–4	Tippy Larkin	KO	4 (10)	Jun 20, 1947	23 years, 322 days	Madison Square Garden, New York City, New York, U.S.	
96	Win	82–10–4	Juste Fontaine	TKO	4 (10)	May 26, 1947	23 years, 267 days	Arena, Philadelphia, Pennsylvania, U.S.	
95	Win	81–10–4	Ralph Zannelli	UD	10	May 9, 1947	23 years, 280 days	Boston Garden, Boston, Massachusetts, U.S.	
94	Win	80–10–4	Willie Russell	UD	10	Apr 25, 1947	23 years, 266 days	Fairgrounds Coliseum, Columbus, Ohio, U.S.	
93	Win	79–10–4	Frankie Conti	TKO	7 (10)	Apr 14, 1947	23 years, 255 days	Little Palestra, Allentown, Pennsylvania, U.S.	
92	Loss	78–10–4	Gene Burton	UD	10	Jan 27, 1947	23 years, 178 days	Coliseum, Chicago, Illinois, U.S.	
91	Win	78–9–4	Ronnie James	KO	9 (15)	Sep 4, 1946	23 years, 33 days	Ninian Park, Cardiff, Wales	Retained NBA lightweight title
90	Win	77–9–4	Ivan Christie	KO	2 (10)	Aug 6, 1946	23 years, 4 days	Crystal Arena, Norwalk, Connecticut, U.S.	
89	Win	76–9–4	Bobby Ruffin	TKO	5 (10)	Jun 12, 1946	22 years, 314 days	Ebbets Field, New York City, New York, U.S.	
88	Win	75–9–4	Enrique Bolanos	TKO	8 (15)	Apr 30, 1946	22 years, 271 days	Wrigley Field, Los Angeles, California, U.S.	Retained NBA lightweight title
87	Win	74–9–4	Eddie Giosa	RTD	1 (10)	Apr 8, 1946	22 years, 249 days	Arena, Philadelphia, Pennsylvania, U.S.	
86	Win	73–9–4	Eddie Giosa	RTD	4 (10)	Mar 11, 1946	22 years, 221 days	Arena, Philadelphia, Pennsylvania, U.S.	
85	Win	72–9–4	Ace Miller	UD	10	Feb 22, 1946	22 years, 204 days	Olympia Stadium, Detroit, Michigan, U.S.	
84	Win	71–9–4	Cleo Shans	PTS	10	Feb 14, 1946	22 years, 196 days	Armory, Orange, New Jersey, U.S.	
83	Draw	70–9–4	Freddie Dawson	MD	10	Jan 28, 1946	22 years, 179 days	Arena, Philadelphia, Pennsylvania, U.S.	
82	Win	70–9–3	Johnny Bratton	PTS	10	Jan 20, 1946	22 years, 171 days	Coliseum Arena, New Orleans, Louisiana, U.S.	
81	Win	69–9–3	Charlie "Petey" Smith	PTS	10	Jan 8, 1946	22 years, 159 days	Arena, Trenton, New Jersey, U.S.	
80	Draw	68–9–3	Wesley Mouzon	MD	10	Nov 26, 1945	22 years, 116 days	Arena, Philadelphia, Pennsylvania, U.S.	
79	Loss	68–9–2	Sammy Angott	TKO	6 (10)	Sep 19, 1945	22 years, 48 days	Forbes Field, Pittsburgh, Pennsylvania, U.S.	
78	Win	68–8–2	Nick Moran	UD	10	Sep 7, 1945	22 years, 36 days	Madison Square Garden, New York City, New York, U.S.	
77	Win	67–8–2	Gene Burton	UD	10	Aug 28, 1945	22 years, 26 days	Arena Stadium, Philadelphia, Pennsylvania, U.S.	
76	Win	66–8–2	Charlie "Petey" Smith	PTS	10	Aug 14, 1945	22 years, 12 days	Roosevelt Stadium, Union City, New Jersey, U.S.	
75	Loss	65–8–2	Willie Joyce	SD	10	Jun 8, 1945	21 years, 310 days	Madison Square Garden, New York City, New York, U.S.	
74	Win	65–7–2	Juan Zurita	TKO	2 (15)	Apr 18, 1945	21 years, 259 days	El Toreo de Cuatro Caminos, Mexico City, Distrito Federal, Mexico	Won NBA lightweight title
73	Win	64–7–2	Dorsey Lay	KO	3 (10)	Mar 26, 1945	21 years, 236 days	Arena, Philadelphia, Pennsylvania, U.S.	
72	Loss	63–7–2	Willie Joyce	UD	12	Mar 2, 1945	21 years, 212 days	Madison Square Garden, New York City, New York, U.S.	
71	Win	63–6–2	Maxie Berger	KO	4 (10)	Jan 22, 1945	21 years, 173 days	Arena, Philadelphia, Pennsylvania, U.S.	
70	Win	62–6–2	Willie Joyce	UD	12	Jan 8, 1945	21 years, 159 days	Convention Hall, Philadelphia, Pennsylvania, U.S.	
69	Win	61–6–2	Dave Castilloux	TKO	5 (10)	Dec 11, 1944	21 years, 131 days	Memorial Auditorium, Buffalo, New York, U.S.	
68	Win	60–6–2	Lulu Costantino	UD	10	Dec 5, 1944	21 years, 125 days	Arena, Cleveland, Ohio, U.S.	
67	Loss	59–6–2	Willie Joyce	SD	10	Nov 13, 1944	21 years, 103 days	Arena, Philadelphia, Pennsylvania, U.S.	
66	Win	59–5–2	Ruby Garcia	TKO	7 (10)	Nov 2, 1944	21 years, 92 days	Carlin's Park, Baltimore, Maryland, U.S.	
65	Win	58–5–2	Johnny Green	KO	2 (10)	Oct 18, 1944	21 years, 77 days	Memorial Auditorium, Buffalo, New York, U.S.	
64	Win	57–5–2	Freddie Dawson	KO	4 (10)	Sep 19, 1944	21 years, 48 days	Arena, Pennsylvania, U.S.	
63	Win	56–5–2	Sammy Angott	SD	10	Sep 6, 1944	21 years, 35 days	Shibe Park, Philadelphia, Pennsylvania, U.S.	
62	Win	55–5–2	Jimmy Hatcher	UD	10	Aug 29, 1944	21 years, 27 days	Griffith Stadium, Washington, District of Columbia, U.S.	
61	Win	54–5–2	Julie Kogon	UD	10	Jul 20, 1944	20 years, 353 days	Madison Square Garden, New York City, New York, U.S.	
60	Win	53–5–2	Joey Pirrone	KO	1 (10)	Jul 10, 1944	20 years, 343 days	Arena Stadium, Philadelphia, Pennsylvania, U.S.	
59	Win	52–5–2	Cleo Shans	TKO	10 (10)	Jun 23, 1944	20 years, 326 days	Madison Square Garden, New York City, New York, U.S.	
58	Win	51–5–2	Sammy Angott	SD	10	Jun 6, 1944	20 years, 309 days	Shibe Park, Philadelphia, Pennsylvania, U.S.	
57	Win	50–5–2	Slugger White	UD	10	May 16, 1944	20 years, 288 days	Convention Hall, Philadelphia, Pennsylvania, U.S.	
56	Win	49–5–2	Mike Delia	KO	1 (10)	Apr 17, 1944	20 years, 259 days	Arena, Philadelphia, Pennsylvania, U.S.	
55	Win	48–5–2	Leroy Saunders	KO	5 (10)	Apr 10, 1944	20 years, 282 days	Valley Arena, Holyoke, Massachusetts, U.S.	
54	Win	47–5–2	Joey Peralta	TKO	9 (10)	Mar 27, 1944	20 years, 238 days	Arena, Philadelphia, Pennsylvania, U.S.	
53	Win	46–5–2	Leo Francis	PTS	8	Mar 13, 1944	20 years, 224 days	Arena, Trenton, New Jersey, U.S.	
52	Win	45–5–2	Ellis Phillips	KO	1 (10)	Feb 28, 1944	20 years, 210 days	Arena, Philadelphia, Pennsylvania, U.S.	
51	Loss	44–5–2	Bob Montgomery	KO	12 (12)	Jan 25, 1944	20 years, 176 days	Convention Hall, Philadelphia, Pennsylvania, U.S.	
50	Win	44–4–2	Mayon Padlo	UD	10	Dec 13, 1943	20 years, 133 days	Arena, Philadelphia, Pennsylvania, U.S.	
49	Win	43–4–2	Willie Cheatum	PTS	8	Nov 29, 1943	20 years, 119 days	Stanley Arena, New Britain, Connecticut, U.S.	
48	Win	42–4–2	Johnny Hutchinson	KO	3 (10)	Nov 8, 1943	20 years, 98 days	Arena, Philadelphia, Pennsylvania, U.S.	
47	Win	41–4–2	Gene Johnson	PTS	10	Oct 29, 1943	20 years, 88 days	Coliseum Arena, New Orleans, Louisiana, U.S.	
46	Win	40–4–2	Eddie Perry	KO	2 (10)	Oct 22, 1943	20 years, 81 days	Coliseum Arena, New Orleans, Louisiana, U.S.	
45	Win	39–4–2	Lefty LaChance	KO	4 (10)	Oct 1, 1943	20 years, 60 days	Mechanics Building, Boston, Massachusetts, U.S.	
44	Win	38–4–2	Jerry Moore	PTS	10	Sep 13, 1943	20 years, 42 days	Century Stadium, West Springfield, Massachusetts, U.S.	
43	Win	37–4–2	Johnny Bellus	PTS	10	Aug 31, 1943	20 years, 29 days	Auditorium Outdoor Arena, Hartford, Connecticut, U.S.	
42	Win	36–4–2	Tommy Jessup	TKO	5 (10)	Aug 24, 1943	20 years, 22 days	Auditorium Outdoor Arena, Hartford, Connecticut, U.S.	
41	Win	35–4–2	Jimmy Hatcher	TKO	6 (10)	Jul 19, 1943	19 years, 351 days	Shibe Park, Philadelphia, Pennsylvania, U.S.	
40	Win	34–4–2	Ray Brown	PTS	10	May 17, 1943	19 years, 288 days	Arena, Philadelphia, Pennsylvania, U.S.	
39	Win	33–4–2	Lefty LaChance	UD	8	May 7, 1943	19 years, 278 days	Boston Garden, Boston, Massachusetts, U.S.	
38	Win	32–4–2	Joe Genovese	TKO	4 (8)	Apr 21, 1943	19 years, 262 days	Arena, Cleveland, Ohio, U.S.	
37	Win	31–4–2	Ruby Garcia	UD	8	Apr 5, 1943	19 years, 246 days	Arena, Philadelphia, Pennsylvania, U.S.	
36	Win	30–4–2	Rudy Giscombe	TKO	3 (6)	Apr 2, 1943	19 years, 243 days	Madison Square Garden, New York City, New York, U.S.	
35	Win	29–4–2	Bill Speary	TKO	2 (10)	Mar 8, 1943	19 years, 218 days	Arena, Philadelphia, Pennsylvania, U.S.	
34	Win	28–4–2	Bobby McQuillar	KO	3 (6)	Feb 23, 1943	19 years, 205 days	Arena, Cleveland, Ohio, U.S.	
33	Win	27–4–2	Sammy Daniels	KO	2 (6)	Feb 22, 1943	19 years, 204 days	Convention Hall, Philadelphia, Pennsylvania, U.S.	
32	Win	26–4–2	Jerry Moore	PTS	6	Jan 29, 1943	19 years, 180 days	Madison Square Garden, New York City, New York, U.S.	
31	Win	25–4–2	Sammy Daniels	PTS	6	Dec 21, 1942	19 years, 141 days	Coliseum, Baltimore, Maryland, U.S.	
30	Win	24–4–2	Bobby Gunther	PTS	8	Dec 7, 1942	19 years, 127 days	Arena, Trenton, New Jersey, U.S.	
29	Win	23–4–2	Gene Burton	KO	4 (6)	Oct 10, 1942	19 years, 69 days	Westchester County Center, White Plains, New York, U.S.	
28	Win	22–4–2	Charley "Dixie" Davis	PTS	8	Sep 10, 1942	19 years, 39 days	Twin City Bowl, Elizabeth, New Jersey, U.S.	
27	Win	21–4–2	Ruby Garcia	PTS	8	Aug 13, 1942	19 years, 11 days	Waltz Dream Arena, Atlantic City, New Jersey, U.S.	
26	Win	20–4–2	Tony Maglione	KO	3 (10)	Jul 29, 1942	18 years, 361 days	Dunn Field, Trenton, New Jersey, U.S.	
25	Win	19–4–2	Ivan Christie	KO	5 (6)	Jun 29, 1942	18 years, 331 days	Meadowbrook Bowl, Newark, New Jersey, U.S.	
24	Win	18–4–2	George "Dusty" Brown	TKO	3 (6)	Jun 15, 1942	18 years, 317 days	St. Ann's Open Air Arena, Bristol, Pennsylvania, U.S.	
23	Win	17–4–2	Abie Kaufman	PTS	8	May 7, 1942	18 years, 278 days	Waltz Dream Arena, Atlantic City, New Jersey, U.S.	
22	Win	16–4–2	Willie Roache	PTS	8	Apr 24, 1942	18 years, 265 days	Raritan Auditorium, Perth Amboy, New Jersey, U.S.	
21	Win	15–4–2	Angelo Pantellas	TKO	5 (8)	Apr 9, 1942	18 years, 250 days	Waltz Dream Arena, Atlantic City, New Jersey, U.S.	
20	Win	14–4–2	Pedro Firpo	PTS	8	Mar 26, 1942	18 years, 236 days	Waltz Dream Arena, Atlantic City, New Jersey, U.S.	
19	Win	13–4–2	Eddie Dowl	PTS	6	Jan 16, 1942	18 years, 167 days	Arena, Trenton, New Jersey, U.S.	
18	Win	12–4–2	Eddie Dowl	PTS	6	Dec 16, 1941	18 years, 136 days	Raritan Auditorium, Perth Amboy, New Jersey, U.S.	
17	Win	11–4–2	Vince Delia	PTS	6	Nov 3, 1941	18 years, 93 days	Arena, Trenton, New Jersey, U.S.	
16	Draw	10–4–2	Benny Williams	NWS	6	Oct 27, 1941	18 years, 86 days	Laurel Garden, Newark, New Jersey, U.S.	
15	Loss	10–4–1	Freddie Archer	PTS	8	Oct 1, 1941	18 years, 60 days	Raritan Auditorium, Perth Amboy, New Jersey, U.S.	
14	Win	10–3–1	Hugh Civatte	TKO	3 (6)	Apr 14, 1941	17 years, 255 days	Arena, Trenton, New Jersey, U.S.	
13	Win	9–3–1	Johnny Rudolph	PTS	6	Apr 9, 1941	17 years, 250 days	Raritan Auditorium, Perth Amboy, New Jersey, U.S.	
12	Win	8–3–1	Joe Genovese	PTS	5	Mar 19, 1941	17 years, 229 days	Raritan Auditorium, Perth Amboy, New Jersey, U.S.	
11	Loss	7–3–1	Joey Zodda	PTS	6	Mar 5, 1941	17 years, 215 days	Raritan Auditorium, Perth Amboy, New Jersey, U.S.	
10	Win	7–2–1	Carl Zullo	TKO	2 (6)	Feb 19, 1941	17 years, 201 days	Raritan Auditorium, Perth Amboy, New Jersey, U.S.	
9	Win	6–2–1	Tommy Fontana	PTS	8	Jan 6, 1941	17 years, 157 days	Arena, Trenton, New Jersey, U.S.	
8	Loss	5–2–1	Tony Maglione	PTS	8	Nov 11, 1940	17 years, 101 days	Arena, Trenton, New Jersey, U.S.	
7	Win	5–1–1	Pete Kelly	KO	2 (6)	Sep 30, 1940	17 years, 59 days	Arena, Trenton, New Jersey, U.S.	
6	Win	4–1–1	Joe Romero	TKO	2 (8)	Jul 19, 1940	16 years, 352 days	Morris County Arena, Mount Freedom, New Jersey, U.S.	
5	Win	3–1–1	Billy Hildebrand	TKO	6 (8)	Jun 14, 1940	16 years, 317 days	Morris County Arena, Mount Freedom, New Jersey, U.S.	
4	Loss	2–1–1	Billy Hildebrand	PTS	6	May 10, 1940	16 years, 282 days	Morristown, New Jersey, U.S.	
3	Draw	2–0–1	Patsy Gall	PTS	6	Apr 1, 1940	16 years, 243 days	Feeley Hall, Hazleton, Pennsylvania, U.S.	
2	Win	2–0	Leroy Born	NWS	4	Mar 29, 1940	16 years, 240 days	Masonic Hall, Highland Park, New Jersey, U.S.	
1	Win	1–0	Carmine Fotti	NWS	4	Mar 15, 1940	16 years, 226 days	Masonic Hall, Highland Park, New Jersey, U.S.	

== Titles in boxing ==
=== Major world titles ===
- NYSAC lightweight champion (135 lbs)
- NBA (WBA) lightweight champion (135 lbs)

=== The Ring magazine titles ===
- The Ring lightweight champion (135 lbs)

=== Undisputed titles ===
- Undisputed lightweight champion

== See also ==
- Lineal championship
- List of lightweight boxing champions

Achievements
Preceded by Juan Zurita	NBA lightweight champion April 18, 1945 - May 25, 1951	Succeeded by Jimmy Carter
Preceded by Bob Montgomery	NYSAC lightweight champion August 04, 1947 - May 25, 1951	Succeeded by Jimmy Carter
Vacant Title last held by Sammy Angott	The Ring lightweight champion August 04, 1947 - May 25, 1951	Succeeded by Jimmy Carter
