= Bob Montgomery (boxer) =

American boxer (1919–1998)

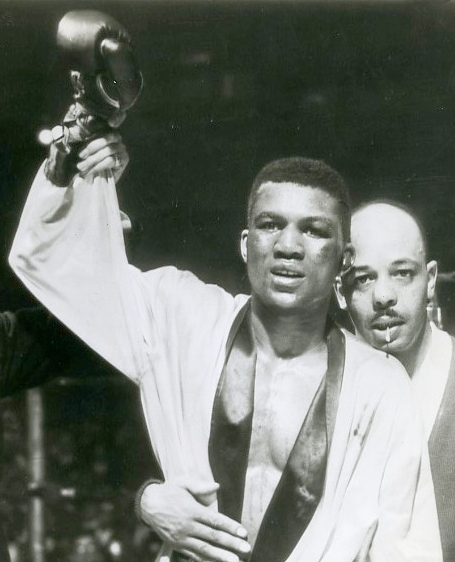
- Montgomery winning the world title in 1943

Personal information
- Nickname: The Philadelphia Bobcat Bobcat
- Born: Bob Montgomery; February 10, 1919 Sumter, South Carolina, US
- Died: August 25, 1998 (aged 79) Philadelphia, Pennsylvania, US
- Height: 5 ft 7.5 in (1.71 m)
- Weight: Lightweight

Boxing career
- Reach: 70 in (178 cm)
- Stance: Orthodox

Boxing record
- Total fights: 97
- Wins: 75
- Win by KO: 37
- Losses: 19
- Draws: 3

Bob Montgomery (February 10, 1919 – August 25, 1998) was an American lightweight boxer who took the New York State Athletic Commission (NYSAC) World Lightweight Championship in May 1943, and again in March 1944. Known as the Philadelphia Bobcat, his managers included Frankie Thomas and Joe Gramby.

== Early life and career ==
Montgomery was born on February 10, 1919, in Sumter, South Carolina. He came to Philadelphia in 1934 during the depression and found a job as a "puller" in a laundry where he pulled clothes out of large industrial laundering machines. He began amateur boxing and training at the "Slaughterhouse", a gym on Philadelphia's Eighth Street and Girard Avenue.

He went undefeated in his first 23 fights, with a record of 22-0-1 and won the Pennsylvania State Lightweight Title in a bout against Mike Evens on October 24, 1939, in Philadelphia.

On September 16, 1940, Montgomery lost to Lew Jenkins in a ten-round unanimous decision before a crowd of 12,900 at Shibe Park in Philadelphia. Jenkins was down in the third round for a count of nine. The United Press gave Jenkins five rounds to four for Montgomery, though ring officials gave Jenkins a somewhat wider margin.

Montgomery was the uncle of Motown Records star Tammi Terrell (born Thomasina "Tommy" Montgomery).

== Boxing career ==
Montgomery beat Julie Kogon three times. Their first fight was at the Broadway Arena in Brooklyn on January 28, 1941, and Montgomery won by decision. They fought again on October 24 that year, at the Chicago Coliseum, with Montgomery again winning by decision. The two squared off for the last time on June 2, 1947, in Kogon's hometown at the New Haven Arena, and Montgomery had another decision win.

Montgomery lost to former lightweight champ Sammy Angott by split decision at Shibe Park on July 7, 1942.

In 1942 Montgomery had two battles with Maxie Shapiro. In the first fight Montgomery lost by decision in Philadelphia, but he won the rematch two months later by unanimous decision in the same arena.

=== Taking the NYSAC World Lightweight Title from Beau Jack, May 1943 ===
Montgomery won recognition by New York state as Lightweight Champion of the World after beating Beau Jack by a fifteen-round unanimous decision on May 21, 1943. Jack won the first round by a wide margin with a flurry of uppercuts and his signature free-wheeling, constant punching from many angles. But Montgomery quickly settled down and scored frequently with a strong straight right that at times had Jack close to a knockout and against which he could find no adequate defense. Jack's eyes were virtually closed during much of the bout, but Montgomery's injuries were restricted to a cut above one eye. A right to the chin briefly knocked Jack to his knees in the eleventh round and he struggled in the remaining rounds. One ringside reporter gave Montgomery eleven rounds to only four for Jack.

Montgomery beat Petey Scalzo in a sixth-round TKO in Philadelphia on October 25, 1943, in Convention Hall in Philadelphia. Montgomery knocked down Scalzo three times during the bout.

==== Losing the NYSAC World Lightweight Title to Beau Jack, November 1943 ====
Montgomery lost the NYSAC World Lightweight Title to Jack in a fifteen-round title match by decision before 17,466 fans on November 19, 1943, at the Garden. The bout was close and in the fourteenth, Montgomery may have had Jack close to a knockout. The United Press scored eight for Jack, five for Montgomery, with two even, though a few of the judges gave as many as six rounds to Montgomery. Jack excelled in both in-fighting and at long range boxing where Montgomery, with a slight advantage in height, would normally have the advantage. Jack's straight rights had Montgomery shaky in the third and fifth rounds.

On January 25, 1944, Montgomery impressively knocked out powerful Black lightweight Ike Williams in the twelfth round at Convention Hall in Philadelphia. Montgomery hammered Williams repeatedly in the first eleven rounds. As Williams walked out of his corner for the twelfth round, Mongtomery tagged him with a series of straight rights that twice floored him for eight counts. Upon rising, Montgomery floored Williams for the final count with a right to the jaw, and he went down by the ropes. Williams would take the World Lightweight Championship in April 1945, holding it for several years.

Montgomery lost to Al "Bummy" Davis at Madison Square Garden in a non-title bout before 17,654 fans in a first-round KO on February 18, 1944. Montgomery went down once, before rising and being knocked to the mat by a left hook for a full count 1:03 into the first round.

=== Re-taking the NYSAC World Lightweight Title from Beau Jack, November 1944 ===
He retook the title from Beau Jack on March 3, 1944, at Madison Square Garden in a fifteen-round split decision before 19,066 fans. Jack had led in the early betting. The fighting was fierce and close throughout and Montgomery was given no more than a two-round advantage by the judges or referee, though the Associated Press scored the bout 8 for Montgomery, 4 for Jack, and three even. After the bout, Montgomery was drafted into the US Army. He continued to box while serving in the Army and was released by June 1946, when he defeated Allie Stoltz.

On February 13, 1945, Montgomery had a fierce bout with Cecil Hudson at the Olympic Auditorium in Los Angeles, California, winning in a ten-round decision. Montgomery received a furlough from active Army duty at Luke Field Arizona, and had not appeared in a competitive match for four months. Through the first six rounds, Montgomery was perplexed by Hudson's dodges and weaves, and unable to land many solid blows. Hudson was knocked to the canvas after the bell in the fourth, and was down very briefly in the eighth and ninth rounds, once Montgomery found his range. Until the two knockdowns, Hudson was leading slightly in points, according to the United Press scoring. In the fury of fighting, one source noted that Montgomery was penalized in a few rounds for hitting after the bell.

=== Defending the NYSAC World Lightweight Title against Allie Stoltz, and Wesley Mouzon, 1946 ===
He successfully defended his second NYSAC World Lightweight Title against Allie Stoltz before 10,872 fans at Madison Square Garden in a thirteenth-round knockout on June 28, 1946. The telling blow was a right to Stolz, 2:54 into the thirteenth, but in a decisive win, Montgomery put Stoltz on the canvas as many as five times prior to the final knockout. Stoltz was down in second, sixth, and eleventh rounds. He may have lacked conditioning from his four and a half month layoff from the ring. He fought gamely and continued to take punishment, even landing a solid right to the chin of Montgomery in the sixth round.

On November 26, 1946, Montgomery defended his NYSAC World Lightweight Title against Wesley Mouzon in an eighth-round knockout at Convention Hall in Philadelphia, Pennsylvania before a substantial crowd, of 12,416. Surprisingly, he had just lost to Mouzon by knockout in a non-title bout only three months previously on August 19, 1946, at Shibe Park in Philadelphia. In their fiercely fought November title match, Mouzon took the first three rounds with speed and jabs, but Montgomery countered with body blows and rights, before ending the bout 2:18 into the eighth with a long left hook. Mouzon took a serious lacing throughout all but the first round, and had a serious injury to his right eye.

On February 7, 1947, Montgomery had a difficult loss to Tony Pellone before a crowd of 11,365 at Olympia Stadium in Detroit in a ten-round unanimous decision. The Associated Press wrote that the crowd was satisfied with the decision for Pellone even though he was the underdog in the bout. Pellone took the aggressive with hard punches to the face and head of his opponent. Montgomery slipped to the canvas in the second for a count of two.

==== Losing second World Lightweight Title, August 1947 ====
He lost the World Lightweight Title for the last time against Ike Williams in a six-round TKO on August 4, 1947, at Municipal Stadium in Philadelphia, Pennsylvania. Montgomery was first knocked for a nine count in the sixth, and eventually the referee stopped the bout after Montgomery seemed helpless against the attacks of Williams. The blow that sent Montgomery to the mat for a count of nine in the sixth was a right to the chin by the hard punching Williams. Williams was four years younger, which may have played a role in the advantage he had against the ring weary Montgomery.

== Life after boxing ==
Montgomery became a promoter at the end of his career. He was inducted into the International Boxing Hall of Fame in 1995.

He died of complications from a stroke at Veterans Affairs Medical Center in Coatsville, outside Philadelphia on August 25, 1998. He is buried at Indiantown Gap National Cemetery in Annville, Pennsylvania.

== Professional boxing record ==
97 fights	75 wins	19 losses
By knockout	37	3
By decision	38	16
Draws	3	

No.	Result	Record	Opponent	Type	Round, time	Date	Location	Notes
97	Loss	75–19–3	Eddie Giosa	UD	10	Mar 27, 1950	Arena, Philadelphia, Pennsylvania, US	
96	Loss	75–18–3	Don Williams	UD	10	Mar 9, 1950	Mechanics Hall, Worcester, Massachusetts, US	
95	Loss	75–17–3	Johnny Greco	UD	10	Feb 27, 1950	Forum, Montreal, Quebec, Canada	
94	Loss	75–16–3	Aldo Minelli	PTS	10	Feb 3, 1950	Uline Arena, Washington, D.C., US	
93	Loss	75–15–3	Joey Angelo	MD	10	Dec 22, 1947	Boston Garden, Boston, Massachusetts, US	
92	Loss	75–14–3	Livio Minelli	UD	10	Nov 24, 1947	Arena, Philadelphia, Pennsylvania, US	
91	Loss	75–13–3	Ike Williams	TKO	6 (15)	Aug 4, 1947	Municipal Stadium, Philadelphia, Pennsylvania, US	Lost NYSAC lightweight title; For NBA and vacant The Ring lightweight titles
90	Win	75–12–3	Frankie Cordino	PTS	10	Jun 9, 1947	Century Stadium, West Springfield, Massachusetts, US	
89	Win	74–12–3	Julie Kogon	PTS	10	Jun 2, 1947	Arena, New Haven, Connecticut, US	
88	Win	73–12–3	George LaRover	UD	10	May 12, 1947	Arena, Philadelphia, Pennsylvania, US	
87	Win	72–12–3	Jesse Flores	KO	3 (10)	Mar 31, 1947	Civic Auditorium, San Francisco, California, US	
86	Win	71–12–3	Joey Barnum	TKO	7 (10), 1:46	Feb 25, 1947	Olympia Stadium, Detroit, Michigan, US	
85	Loss	70–12–3	Tony Pellone	UD	10	Feb 7, 1947	Olympia Stadium, Detroit, Michigan, US	
84	Win	70–11–3	Eddie Giosa	TKO	5 (10), 2:18	Jan 20, 1947	Arena, Philadelphia, Pennsylvania, US	
83	Win	69–11–3	Wesley Mouzon	KO	8 (15), 2:18	Nov 26, 1946	Convention Hall, Philadelphia, Pennsylvania, US	Retained NYSAC lightweight title
82	Loss	68–11–3	Wesley Mouzon	KO	2 (12), 1:48	Aug 19, 1946	Shibe Park, Philadelphia, Pennsylvania, US	
81	Win	68–10–3	George LaRover	UD	10	Jul 29, 1946	Century Stadium, West Springfield, Massachusetts, US	
80	Win	67–10–3	Allie Stolz	KO	13 (15), 2:54	Jun 28, 1946	Madison Square Garden, New York City, New York, US	Retained NYSAC lightweight title
79	Win	66–10–3	Ernie Petrone	KO	4 (10)	Mar 21, 1946	Arena, New Haven, Connecticut, US	
78	Win	65–10–3	Tony Pellone	UD	10	Mar 8, 1946	Madison Square Garden, New York City, New York, US	
77	Win	64–10–3	Leo Rodak	SD	10	Feb 15, 1946	Chicago Stadium, Chicago, Illinois, US	
76	Win	63–10–3	Billy Parsons	PTS	10	Feb 3, 1946	Coliseum Arena, New Orleans, Louisiana, US	
75	Win	62–10–3	Nick Moran	SD	10	Jul 9, 1945	Shibe Park, Philadelphia, Pennsylvania, US	
74	Loss	61–10–3	Nick Moran	MD	10	May 8, 1945	Olympic Auditorium, Los Angeles, California, US	
73	Win	61–9–3	Genaro Rojo	TKO	8 (10), 1:51	Mar 20, 1945	Olympic Auditorium, Los Angeles, California, US	
72	Win	60–9–3	Cecil Hudson	UD	10	Feb 13, 1945	Olympic Auditorium, Los Angeles, California, US	
71	Loss	59–9–3	Beau Jack	MD	10	Aug 4, 1944	Madison Square Garden, New York City, New York, US	
70	Win	59–8–3	Joey Peralta	UD	10	Apr 28, 1944	Coliseum, Chicago, Illinois, US	
69	Win	58–8–3	Beau Jack	SD	15	Mar 3, 1944	Madison Square Garden, New York City, New York, US	Won NYSAC lightweight title
68	Loss	57–8–3	Al 'Bummy' Davis	TKO	1 (10), 1:03	Feb 18, 1944	Madison Square Garden, New York City, New York, US	
67	Win	57–7–3	Ike Williams	KO	12 (12), 2:49	Jan 25, 1944	Convention Hall, Philadelphia, Pennsylvania, US	
66	Win	56–7–3	Joey Peralta	UD	10	Jan 7, 1944	Olympia Stadium, Detroit, Michigan, US	
65	Loss	55–7–3	Beau Jack	UD	15	Nov 19, 1943	Madison Square Garden, New York City, New York, US	Lost NYSAC lightweight title
64	Win	55–6–3	Petey Scalzo	TKO	6 (10), 0:53	Oct 25, 1943	Convention Hall, Philadelphia, Pennsylvania, US	
63	Win	54–6–3	Fritzie Zivic	UD	10	Aug 23, 1943	Shibe Park, Philadelphia, Pennsylvania, US	
62	Win	53–6–3	Frankie Wills	UD	10	Jul 20, 1943	Griffith Stadium, Washington, D.C., US	
61	Win	52–6–3	Al Reasoner	KO	6 (10), 2:51	Jul 4, 1943	Pelican Stadium, New Orleans, Louisiana, US	
60	Win	51–6–3	Beau Jack	UD	15	May 21, 1943	Madison Square Garden, New York City, New York, US	Won NYSAC lightweight title
59	Win	50–6–3	Henry Vasquez	PTS	8	May 3, 1943	Valley Arena, Holyoke, Massachusetts, US	
58	Win	49–6–3	Gene Johnson	UD	10	Apr 30, 1943	Watres Armory, Scranton, Pennsylvania, US	
57	Win	48–6–3	Roman Alvarez	KO	4 (10), 1:27	Apr 5, 1943	Arena, Philadelphia, Pennsylvania, US	
56	Win	47–6–3	Lulu Costantino	UD	10	Feb 22, 1943	Convention Hall, Philadelphia, Pennsylvania, US	
55	Win	46–6–3	Chester Rico	TKO	7 (15)	Jan 8, 1943	Madison Square Garden, New York City, New York, US	
54	Win	45–6–3	Maxie Shapiro	UD	10	Dec 1, 1942	Arena, Philadelphia, Pennsylvania, US	
53	Loss	44–6–3	Maxie Shapiro	MD	10	Oct 6, 1942	Arena, Philadelphia, Pennsylvania, US	
52	Win	44–5–3	Bobby Ruffin	UD	10	Aug 13, 1942	Madison Square Garden, New York City, New York, US	
51	Loss	43–5–3	Sammy Angott	SD	12	Jul 7, 1942	Shibe Park, Philadelphia, Pennsylvania, US	
50	Win	43–4–3	Carmen Notch	PTS	10	May 8, 1942	Ice House, Toledo, Ohio, US	
49	Win	42–4–3	Joey Peralta	UD	10	Apr 20, 1942	Arena, Philadelphia, Pennsylvania, US	
48	Loss	41–4–3	Sammy Angott	UD	12	Mar 6, 1942	Madison Square Garden, New York City, New York, US	
47	Win	41–3–3	Mayon Padlo	KO	8 (10), 1:26	Jan 5, 1942	Arena, Philadelphia, Pennsylvania, US	
46	Win	40–3–3	Jimmy Garrison	TKO	4 (10), 3:00	Dec 8, 1941	Arena, Philadelphia, Pennsylvania, US	
45	Win	39–3–3	Frankie Wallace	TKO	5 (10)	Oct 30, 1941	Williamsport, Pennsylvania, US	
44	Win	38–3–3	Julie Kogon	UD	10	Oct 24, 1941	Coliseum, Chicago, Illinois, US	
43	Win	37–3–3	Davey Day	KO	1 (10), 2:59	Oct 10, 1941	Chicago Stadium, Chicago, Illinois, US	
42	Win	36–3–3	Mike Kaplan	UD	10	Sep 8, 1941	Shibe Park, Philadelphia, Pennsylvania, US	
41	Win	35–3–3	Slugger White	UD	10	Jul 14, 1941	Coliseum, Baltimore, Maryland, US	
40	Win	34–3–3	Frankie Wallace	KO	3 (10)	Jul 3, 1941	Garden Pier, Atlantic City, New Jersey, US	
39	Win	33–3–3	Wishy Jones	TKO	4 (10)	Jun 30, 1941	Griffith Stadium, Washington, D.C., US	
38	Win	32–3–3	Manuel Villa II	KO	1 (10), 1:50	Jun 16, 1941	Coliseum, Baltimore, Maryland, US	
37	Win	31–3–3	Lew Jenkins	UD	10	May 16, 1941	Madison Square Garden, New York City, New York, US	
36	Win	30–3–3	Nick Peters	TKO	3 (10)	Apr 28, 1941	Arena, Philadelphia, Pennsylvania, US	
35	Win	29–3–3	George Zengaras	TKO	3 (10), 1:22	Mar 3, 1941	Arena, Philadelphia, Pennsylvania, US	
34	Win	28–3–3	Al Nettlow	PTS	8	Feb 7, 1941	Madison Square Garden, New York City, New York, US	
33	Win	27–3–3	Julie Kogon	PTS	8	Jan 28, 1941	Broadway Arena, New York City, New York, US	
32	Loss	26–3–3	Sammy Angott	MD	10	Nov 25, 1940	Arena, Philadelphia, Pennsylvania, US	
31	Draw	26–2–3	Norment Quarles	PTS	10	Nov 7, 1940	Waltz Dream Arena, Atlantic City, New Jersey, US	
30	Loss	26–2–2	Lew Jenkins	UD	10	Sep 16, 1940	Shibe Park, Philadelphia, Pennsylvania, US	
29	Win	26–1–2	Jimmy Vaughn	KO	2 (10)	Jul 5, 1940	Convention Hall, Atlantic City, New Jersey, US	
28	Win	25–1–2	Al Nettlow	UD	12	Jun 3, 1940	Shibe Park, Philadelphia, Pennsylvania, US	
27	Win	24–1–2	Al Nettlow	SD	10	Mar 11, 1940	Arena, Philadelphia, Pennsylvania, US	
26	Draw	23–1–2	Al Nettlow	PTS	10	Jan 29, 1940	Arena, Philadelphia, Pennsylvania, US	
25	Win	23–1–1	Mike Evans	KO	1 (10), 2:19	Nov 27, 1939	Arena, Philadelphia, Pennsylvania, US	
24	Loss	22–1–1	Tommy Speigal	UD	10	Nov 10, 1939	Cambria A.C., Philadelphia, Pennsylvania, US	Lost USA Pennsylvania State lightweight title
23	Win	22–0–1	Mike Evans	UD	10	Oct 23, 1939	Arena, Philadelphia, Pennsylvania, US	Won USA Pennsylvania State lightweight title
22	Win	21–0–1	Charley Gilley	TKO	6 (8)	Oct 5, 1939	Waltz Dream Arena, Atlantic City, New Jersey, US	
21	Win	20–0–1	Ray Ingram	PTS	10	Aug 24, 1939	Convention Hall, Atlantic City, New Jersey, US	
20	Win	19–0–1	Jimmy Murray	TKO	3 (6), 1:17	Aug 14, 1939	Shibe Park, Philadelphia, Pennsylvania, US	
19	Win	18–0–1	Frankie Wallace	PTS	10	Jul 3, 1939	Arena Stadium, Philadelphia, Pennsylvania, US	
18	Win	17–0–1	Tommy Rawson Jr.	KO	1 (8), 2:24	Jun 21, 1939	Arena Stadium, Philadelphia, Pennsylvania, US	
17	Win	16–0–1	Charley Burns	KO	2 (8), 2:25	Jun 15, 1939	Waltz Dream Arena, Atlantic City, New Jersey, US	
16	Win	15–0–1	Norment Quarles	TKO	4 (10)	May 23, 1939	Arena, Philadelphia, Pennsylvania, US	
15	Draw	14–0–1	George Zengaras	PTS	10	May 1, 1939	Arena, Philadelphia, Pennsylvania, US	
14	Win	14–0	Eddie Guerra	PTS	8	Apr 20, 1939	Waltz Dream Arena, Atlantic City, New Jersey, US	
13	Win	13–0	Young Raspi	TKO	6 (8)	Apr 13, 1939	Waltz Dream Arena, Atlantic City, New Jersey, US	
12	Win	12–0	Benny Berman	PTS	8	Mar 30, 1939	Waltz Dream Arena, Atlantic City, New Jersey, US	
11	Win	11–0	Frankie Saia	KO	4 (8), 2:12	Mar 16, 1939	Olympia A.C., Philadelphia, Pennsylvania, US	
10	Win	10–0	Billy Miller	TKO	2 (8)	Mar 9, 1939	Waltz Dream Arena, Atlantic City, New Jersey, US	
9	Win	9–0	Jay Macedon	PTS	8	Feb 23, 1939	Waltz Dream Arena, Atlantic City, New Jersey, US	
8	Win	8–0	Charley Burns	PTS	8	Feb 2, 1939	Waltz Dream Arena, Atlantic City, New Jersey, US	
7	Win	7–0	Harvey Jacobs	KO	1 (8), 1:39	Jan 19, 1939	North Side Boxing Club, Atlantic City, New Jersey, US	
6	Win	6–0	Jackie Sheppard	PTS	8	Dec 8, 1938	Waltz Dream Arena, Atlantic City, New Jersey, US	
5	Win	5–0	Red Rossi	KO	2 (6)	Nov 17, 1938	Waltz Dream Arena, Atlantic City, New Jersey, US	
4	Win	4–0	Joe Beltrante	TKO	3 (6), 2:45	Nov 10, 1938	Waltz Dream Arena, Atlantic City, New Jersey, US	
3	Win	3–0	Eddie Stewart	TKO	2 (6)	Nov 4, 1938	Cambria A.C., Philadelphia, Pennsylvania, US	
2	Win	2–0	Pat Patucci	KO	2 (6)	Oct 27, 1938	Waltz Dream Arena, Atlantic City, New Jersey, US	
1	Win	1–0	Young Johnny Buff	KO	2 (6)	Oct 13, 1938	Waltz Dream Arena, Atlantic City, New Jersey, US	

== Boxing achievements and honors ==
Achievements
Preceded by Beau Jack	NYSAC lightweight champion May 21, 1943 – November 19, 1943	Succeeded by Beau Jack
Preceded by Beau Jack	NYSAC lightweight champion March 03, 1944 - August 04, 1947	Succeeded by Ike Williams

== See also ==
- International Boxing Hall of Fame
