= Sammy Angott =

American boxer (1915–1980)

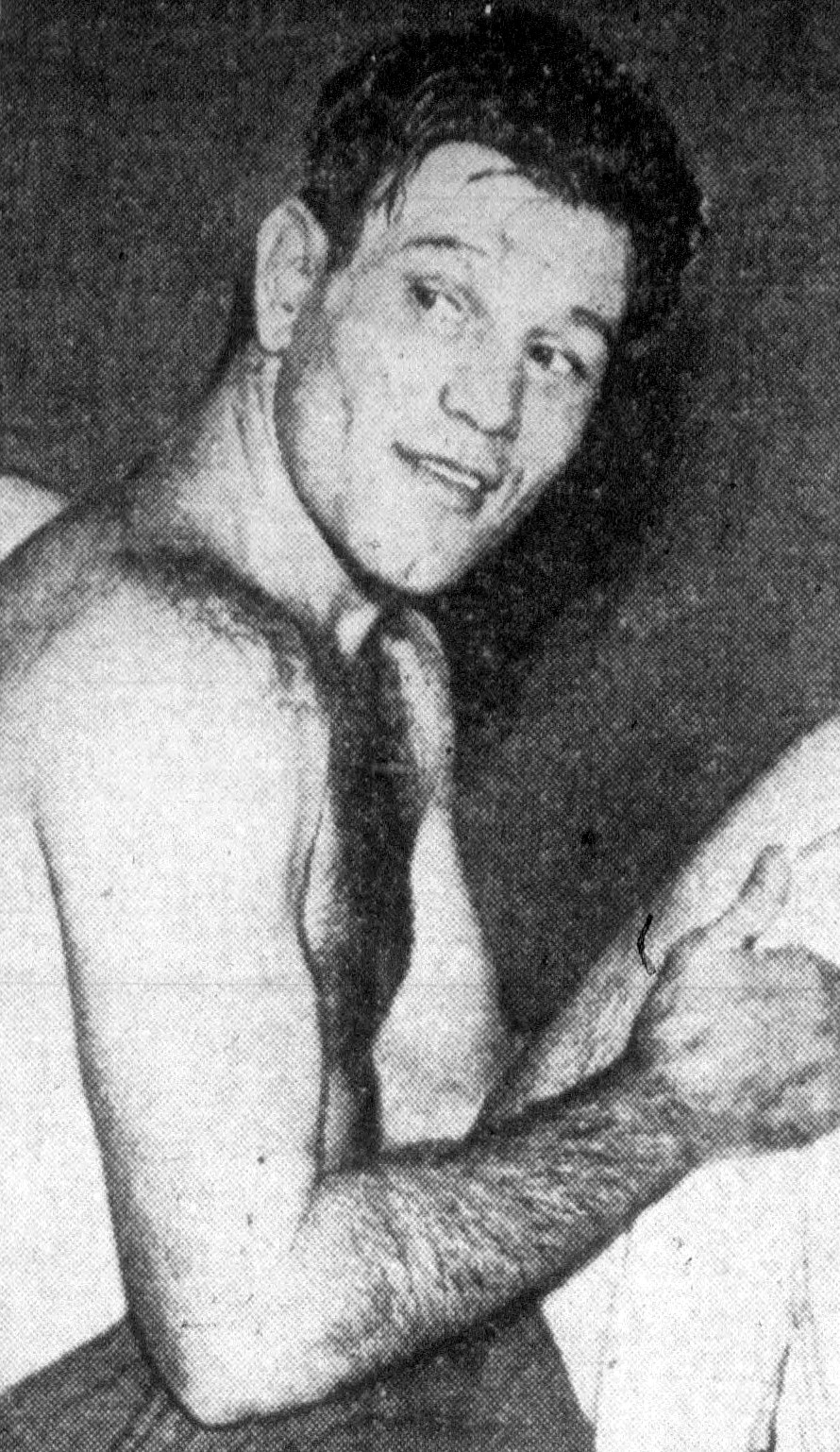

Personal information
- Nicknames: The Clutch; The Louisville Slugger; The Washington Windmill
- Nationality: American
- Born: Salvatore Engotti; January 17, 1915 Washington, Pennsylvania or California, Pennsylvania
- Died: October 22, 1980 (aged 65) Cleveland, Ohio, U.S.
- Weight: Lightweight

Boxing career
- Stance: Orthodox

Boxing record
- Total fights: 131
- Wins: 94
- Win by KO: 23
- Losses: 29
- Draws: 8

Sammy Angott (January 17, 1915 – October 22, 1980) was born Salvatore Engotti in a Pittsburgh area town in Pennsylvania. He reigned as the Undisputed Lightweight Champion from December 19, 1941 – November 14, 1942. He was known as a clever boxer who liked to follow up a clean punch by grabbing his opponent, causing him to be known as "The Clutch."

In his career, Angott met the best fighters in the welterweight and lightweight divisions. These included Sugar Ray Robinson, Bob Montgomery, Beau Jack, Fritzie Zivic, Henry Armstrong, Redtop Davis, Sonny Boy West, and Ike Williams. His manager was Charlie Jones. Angott retired with a record of 94 wins (23 KOs), 29 losses and 8 draws. He was knocked out just once in his career, by Beau Jack in 1946. Statistical boxing website BoxRec lists Angott as the #6 ranked lightweight of all-time.

== Early career ==
=== Taking the Kentucky Lightweight Championship ===
Angott defeated Lew Massey at the Columbia Gymnasium in Louisville, Kentucky in a ten-round points decision on December 6, 1937. Massey took a serious beating and may have been near a knockout in the sixth and ninth, though there were no knockdowns in the bout. The Kentucky boxing commissioner ruled that Massey did not put in enough of an effort in the bout and moved for a temporary suspension. Massey was a solid competitor who had met six world champions before meeting Angott. During his early boxing career, Angott often listed Louisville as his home. Only a month earlier, he had taken the Kentucky State Lightweight Title against Wishy Jones in a ten-round decision.

Angott first defeated Wesley Ramey on May 6, 1938, in a ten-round decision in Louisville, Kentucky. On September 16, 1938, Angott defeated Ramey again in a ten-round unanimous decision at the Sportatorium in Dallas. Ramey held the Michigan State Lightweight Title in 1931.

On May 23, 1938, Angott defeated Frankie Covelli in a ten-round unanimous decision in Chicago. According to the Chicago Tribune, though Angott won the decision, the bout was a tough battle.

On June 1, 1938, Angott defeated Irving Eldridge in a ten-round points decision at Hickey Park in Millvale, Pennsylvania. Eldridge was down for a nine count in the third from a series of rights and was lucky to escape a knockout in the bout. In the eighth and tenth, Angott caught Eldridge on the ropes and appeared to be close to winning by knockout, but Eldridge soldiered on.

On June 28, 1938, he defeated Tommy Speigal at Hickey Park in Millvale, Pennsylvania in a ten-round unanimous decision. Angott had Speigal floundering in the eighth with a flurry of lefts and rights, though there were no knockdowns in the bout. He had lost decisively to Speigal on November 2, 1936, in ten rounds in Maryland, and again on August 24, 1936, in Millvale, Pennsylvania in a closer eight round split decision. Their August 24 bout was quite close, with Angott taking the aggressive and probably landing more blows, though Speigal may have landed more solid punches.

On July 17, 1939, Angott defeated ethnic Syrian boxer Petey Sarron in a ten-round decision at Forbes Field in Pittsburgh. Sarron had previously held the NBA World Featherweight Title and the loss was one of his last fights. Sarron's strongest rounds were likely the fifth and tenth when he put Angott to the mat for a no-count, but Angott seemed to hold an advantage in points throughout the bout. Angott gained more of his lead on points in the later rounds after the thirty-one year old Sarron had tired. Sarron scored often with his left, but it did not affect the attack of the Angott, who was nine years younger.

He defeated Mexican boxer "Baby" Arizmendi on November 3, 1939, in a ten-round unanimous decision at the Chicago Stadium. Angott was down to his knees for a no count in the second round, but with a barrage of left and rights, he stacked up points in the remaining rounds. In the eighth, he opened a gash in his opponent's eyes, and gained a further advantage.

== World Lightweight Title ==
=== First taking the NBA World Lightweight Title, May 1940 ===
On May 3, 1940, the lanky fighter gained recognition from the National Boxing Association (NBA) as its world lightweight champion when he outpointed Davey Day over 15 rounds in Louisville, Kentucky. On the eve of the Kentucky Derby before a crowd of 8,000, acting referee Jack Dempsey made the decision giving six rounds to Angott, five to day, and four even. The Associated Press gave Angott nine rounds, with six to Day.

Angott first faced the great Sugar Ray Robinson on July 21, 1941, at Shibe Park in Philadelphia, losing in a ten-round decision. He lost twice more to Robinson on July 31, 1942, in a ten-round decision at Madison Square Garden and on March 4, 1946, in a ten-round decision in Pittsburgh.

=== Taking the NYSAC World Lightweight Title December 1941 ===
On December 19, 1941, Angott took the New York State Athletic Commission (NYSAC) World Lightweight Title from Lew Jenkins before a crowd of 11,343 at New York's Madison Square Garden. Angott became undisputed champion as he held both the NYSAC and NBA World Lightweight Championship. He dominated the fighting outpointing Jenkins over fifteen rounds.

==== Single defense of the Lightweight Title against Allie Stolz, May 1942 ====
Angott defended the title only once, a close 15-round points win over Allie Stolz on May 15, 1942, at New York's Madison Square Garden. Stoltz was penalized for low blows in the twelfth and fifteenth rounds, and the substantial crowd of 16,099 was displeased with the final decision for Angott. Stoltz put Angott to the mat in the third round with two fast blows to the chin, but Angott was up and ready by the count of nine. The United Press gave Angott eight rounds, Stoltz five, and two even, though the referee gave nine rounds to Stolz in the close bout. The two judges each gave Angott eight rounds.

On September 28, 1942, Angott defeated Aldo Spoldi, a former European lightweight champion, in a slow non-title ten round bout at City Park Stadium before a crowd of around 5,000 in New Orleans, and according to one source took nearly all of the rounds. The referee threatened to stop the bout in the sixth and seventh for the lack of solid blows thrown. Angott had formerly beaten Spoldi on April 14, 1939, at the Hippodrome in New York before around 2,600 fans in a ten-round points decision. Spoldi was credited with only the fifth, sixth and seventh rounds, while Angott was given the rest.

=== Vacating the World Lightweight Title due to broken hand, 1942 ===
Weary of the ring and complaining of a broken hand that had failed to heal properly even after surgery, he vacated the World Lightweight Title officially on November 13, 1942. He dug ditches and worked as an athletic instructor at Washington and Jefferson College for the five months he was away from the ring.

=== Defeating Willie Pep, March 1943 ===
Returning to professional boxing after five months on March 19, 1943, Angott defeated Willie Pep in a non-title bout at New York's Madison Square Garden by a ten-round unanimous decision. He was dominant in the first five rounds and held on to win the decision. On November 20, 1942, Pep had taken the NYSAC World Featherweight Title. Angott's win after being away from the ring was something of a surprise to the 16,834 fans present at the match. The United Press gave six rounds to Angott, three to Pep, and one even, though the official voting was a bit closer. There were no serious knockdowns, though each boxer had at least one slip to the canvas. Angott showed greater speed and connected with more blows, though the fight in most respects was close, and Pep was favored in the pre-fight betting.

On June 11, 1943, Angott lost to the great Henry Armstrong at Madison Square Garden in a close ten round unanimous decision. The referee voted six rounds for Armstrong and four for Angott, and the judges ruled close to that margin. Angott was nailed with a hard punch to the body in the eighth round that doubled him up, and started a downhill slide, that gave the eighth, ninth, and tenth to his opponent. The savage bout had Armstrong bleeding from the mouth and Angott cut on the left eye and blackened on the left eye.

== Retaking the NBA World Lightweight Title, October 1943 ==
Angott took the vacant NBA World Lightweight crown by outpointing Black Baltimore boxer Slugger White in a title bout on October 27, 1943, at Los Angeles' Gilmore Stadium in 15 rounds. At the opening of the fourth round, a generator failure plunged the stadium into darkness, before it could be repaired an hour later. Angott showed dominance in the bout. In the fifteenth, he unleashed a right that briefly sent White out of the ring. Angott lost the title before taking the NYSAC World Lightweight Title, making his title not considered a "unified" World Lightweight Title.

He defeated Bobby Ruffin on December 17, 1943, in a fierce ten round split decision before 11,844 fans at New York's Madison Square Garden. Angott amassed a lead in points in the opening rounds, but Ruffin punched hard enough in the closing rounds to split the decision. The Associated Press gave Angott six rounds to three for Ruffin with one even, though Angott had taken a very brief one count knockdown to the mat in the first round when he was floored with a right from Ruffin after losing his focus dealing a wild punch. Angott used his "windmill" offense dealing flurries of blows at times during the bout.

=== Final loss of the NBA World Lightweight Title ===
He lost the NBA title for the last time to Mexican boxer Juan Zurita on March 8, 1944, in a fifteen-round unanimous decision title bout before 11,300 at Gilmore Field in Los Angeles. Zurita led in points by a wide margin by the fight's end. Angott clinched frequently and may have lacked the stamina at 30 required to compete with Zurita who punished him throughout the bout. Zurita dominated after the first round which Angott won with aggressive attacks. Angott may have had difficulty penetrating Zurita's southpaw stance, which gave him trouble landing solid blows throughout the bout. Many of Zurita's more telling blows were lefts delivered with a southpaw stance. Angott claimed he had difficulty making weight and had run five miles and taken steam baths before the weigh-in.

=== A victory and two close losses against Lightweight Champion Ike Williams, 1944–45 ===
On September 19, 1945, Angott defeated reigning lightweight champion Ike Williams in a sixth round non-title TKO at Forbes Field in Pittsburgh. The win was a bit of an upset as Williams led in the early betting by as much as 3 to 1. Williams was hospitalized that evening from a badly contused or broken rib he received in the first round from a powerful roundhouse right from Angott. The referee stopped the bout in the sixth, after observing Williams was in pain. In two previous meetings between the two on September 6, and June 7, 1944, Williams had won in a somewhat close split decisions at Shibe Park in Philadelphia. In their September 6 bout, Williams clinched the decision with a furious two handed attack in the last two of their ten-round match. Angott appeared strongest in the sixth and seventh rounds with strong blows to Williams' body. In the close bout before 7,568, most of the judges gave Angott the second, seventh, and eighth rounds, though Williams hit more cleanly and was given more rounds by the majority of judges.

=== TKO loss to former lightweight champion Beau Jack, July 1946 ===
On July 8, 1946, he fell to a seventh-round knockout by Beau Jack at Griffith Stadium in Washington, D.C. The bout was rough and Angott did not answer the bell for the seventh, later complaining of pain from kidney punches in the fifth and sixth rounds, as well as suffering from a badly cramped leg. It was Angott's only known knockout in his career. Jack held the World Lightweight Title for seven months in 1943 and through March in 1944.

On May 16, 1947, Angott defeated Black boxer Johnny Bratton in a ten-round unanimous decision at Chicago Stadium. Before 18,409 fans, Angott took control in the early rounds and gained enough of a margin in points to win the decision. Angott was down for a three count in the tenth round, but Bratton waited until the closing seconds of most rounds to stage an attack. Many in the crowd were not pleased with the verdict, as the fight was close, and believed Bratton deserved at least a draw ruling. The bout was close with one judge and the referee scoring the bout 51 to 49 for Angott. Bratton was considered a serious lightweight contender prior to the match and had won his last ten fights.

Angott defeated Mexican boxer Kid Azteca in his second to last fight on June 26, 1950, at Dudley Field in El Paso in a ten-round unanimous decision. Azteca had formerly held the Mexican Welterweight Title. The crowd of 3,500 was displeased with the frequent clinching in the bout, largely done by Angott. Handlers had difficulty separating the two boxers after the final bell, and a small riot ensued requiring a police escort to get Angott to his dressing room.

== Life after boxing ==
After retiring from boxing, he was employed by the Shipping Department at Eaton Corporation in Massillon, near Columbus, Ohio, for seventeen years before retiring in 1967 due to poor health.

He died in the Cleveland Clinic in Cleveland, Ohio on October 22, 1980, after a long illness. He left a wife Evelyn, one son, and two daughters.

== Achievements and honors ==
He was inducted into The Ring magazine Hall of Fame in 1973 and the International Boxing Hall of Fame in 1998.

== Professional boxing record ==
131 fights	94 wins	29 losses
By knockout	22	1
By decision	72	28
Draws	8	

No.	Result	Record	Opponent	Type	Round	Date	Location	Notes
131	Loss	94–29–8	Sonny Boy West	UD	10	Aug 8, 1950	Motor City Speedway, Detroit, Michigan, U.S.	
130	Win	94–28–8	Kid Azteca	UD	10	Jun 26, 1950	Dudley Field, El Paso, Texas, U.S.	
129	Win	93–28–8	Tim Dalton	PTS	10	Jun 22, 1950	Municipal Stadium, Davenport, Iowa, U.S.	
128	Loss	92–28–8	John L. Davis	UD	10	May 10, 1950	Oaks Ballpark, Emeryville, California, U.S.	
127	Loss	92–27–8	Sonny Boy West	UD	10	Mar 20, 1950	Coliseum, Baltimore, Maryland, U.S.	
126	Win	92–26–8	Ralph Zannelli	SD	10	Feb 20, 1950	Rhode Island Auditorium, Providence, Rhode Island, U.S.	
125	Win	91–26–8	Clem Custer	TKO	8 (10)	Jan 23, 1950	Coliseum, Baltimore, Maryland, U.S.	
124	Draw	90–26–8	Sonny Boy West	PTS	10	Jan 2, 1950	Coliseum, Baltimore, Maryland, U.S.	
123	Loss	90–26–7	Tony Riccio	PTS	10	Dec 12, 1949	Laurel Garden, Newark, New Jersey, U.S.	
122	Loss	90–25–7	Don Williams	SD	10	Oct 19, 1949	Mechanics Hall, Worcester, Massachusetts, U.S.	
121	Win	90–24–7	Bill Sudduth	PTS	10	Aug 5, 1949	Auditorium, Topeka, Kansas, U.S.	
120	Win	89–24–7	Johnny Bryant	KO	2 (10)	Mar 3, 1949	Clarksburg Auditorium, Clarksburg, West Virginia, U.S.	
119	Win	88–24–7	Buster Miles	PTS	10	Jun 11, 1948	Radio Center Arena, Huntington, West Virginia, U.S.	
118	Win	87–24–7	Rudy Zadell	PTS	10	Mar 15, 1948	State Armory, Cumberland, Maryland, U.S.	
117	Win	86–24–7	Eddie Pusey	KO	2 (8)	Feb 17, 1948	Jefferson County Armory, Louisville, Kentucky, U.S.	
116	Win	85–24–7	Johnny Bratton	UD	10	May 16, 1947	Chicago Stadium, Chicago, Illinois, U.S.	
115	Win	84–24–7	Cal Elefante	KO	3 (10)	Apr 9, 1947	Auditorium, Zanesville, Ohio, U.S.	
114	Win	83–24–7	Teddy Davis	TKO	3 (10)	Mar 24, 1947	Auditorium, Wheeling, West Virginia, U.S.	
113	Win	82–24–7	Nick Castiglione	KO	4 (10)	Mar 14, 1947	Chicago Stadium, Chicago, Illinois, U.S.	
112	Win	81–24–7	Jackie McFarland	TKO	2 (10)	Feb 27, 1947	Armory, Mansfield, Ohio, U.S.	
111	Win	80–24–7	Johnny Bryant	TKO	5 (10)	Feb 24, 1947	Armory, Canton, Ohio, U.S.	
110	Win	79–24–7	George Dixon	KO	1 (10)	Feb 17, 1947	Auditorium, Wheeling, West Virginia, U.S.	
109	Loss	78–24–7	Beau Jack	TKO	7 (10)	Jul 8, 1946	Griffith Stadium, Washington, District of Columbia, U.S.	
108	Loss	78–23–7	Sugar Ray Robinson	UD	10	Mar 4, 1946	Duquesne Gardens, Pittsburgh, Pennsylvania, U.S.	
107	Win	78–22–7	Danny Kapilow	UD	10	Dec 10, 1945	Duquesne Gardens, Pittsburgh, Pennsylvania, U.S.	
106	Win	77–22–7	Danny Kapilow	UD	10	Oct 24, 1945	Uline Arena, Washington, District of Columbia, U.S.	
105	Win	76–22–7	Ike Williams	TKO	6 (10)	Sep 19, 1945	Forbes Field, Pittsburgh, Pennsylvania, U.S.	
104	Draw	75–22–7	Gene Burton	MD	10	Aug 20, 1945	Forbes Field, Pittsburgh, Pennsylvania, U.S.	
103	Loss	75–22–6	Jimmy McDaniels	MD	10	Nov 11, 1944	Madison Square Garden, New York City, New York, U.S.	
102	Loss	75–21–6	Ike Williams	SD	10	Sep 6, 1944	Shibe Park, Philadelphia, Pennsylvania, U.S.	
101	Win	75–20–6	Aaron Perry	UD	11	Aug 1, 1944	Griffith Stadium, Washington, District of Columbia, U.S.	
100	Loss	74–20–6	Ike Williams	SD	10	Jun 7, 1944	Shibe Park, Philadelphia, Pennsylvania, U.S.	
99	Win	74–19–6	Aaron Perry	SD	10	Apr 4, 1944	Uline Arena, Washington, District of Columbia, U.S.	
98	Loss	73–19–6	Juan Zurita	UD	15	Mar 8, 1944	Gilmore Field, Los Angeles, California, U.S.	Lost NBA lightweight title
97	Draw	73–18–6	Beau Jack	PTS	10	Jan 28, 1944	Madison Square Garden, New York City, New York, U.S.	
96	Win	73–18–5	Bobby Ruffin	SD	10	Dec 17, 1943	Madison Square Garden, New York City, New York, U.S.	
95	Win	72–18–5	Slugger White	UD	15	Oct 27, 1943	Gilmore Stadium, Los Angeles, California, U.S.	Won vacant NBA lightweight title
94	Win	71–18–5	Joey Peralta	UD	10	Oct 1, 1943	Olympia Stadium, Detroit, Michigan, U.S.	
93	Loss	70–18–5	Henry Armstrong	UD	10	Jun 11, 1943	Madison Square Garden, New York City, New York, U.S.	
92	Win	70–17–5	Willie Pep	UD	10	Mar 19, 1943	Madison Square Garden, New York City, New York, U.S.	
91	Win	69–17–5	Aldo Spoldi	PTS	10	Sep 28, 1942	City Park Stadium, New Orleans, Louisiana, U.S.	
90	Loss	68–17–5	Sugar Ray Robinson	UD	10	Jul 31, 1942	Madison Square Garden, New York City, New York, U.S.	
89	Win	68–16–5	Bob Montgomery	SD	10	Jul 7, 1942	Shibe Park, Philadelphia, Pennsylvania, U.S.	
88	Win	67–16–5	Allie Stolz	SD	15	May 15, 1942	Madison Square Garden, New York City, New York, U.S.	Retained NBA, NYSAC, and The Ring lightweight titles
87	Win	66–16–5	Bob Montgomery	UD	12	Mar 6, 1942	Madison Square Garden, New York City, New York, U.S.	
86	Win	65–16–5	Lew Jenkins	UD	15	Dec 19, 1941	Madison Square Garden, New York City, New York, U.S.	Retained NBA lightweight title; Won NYSAC and The Ring lightweight titles
85	Win	64–16–5	Battling Chino	TKO	6 (10)	Oct 30, 1941	Aragon Gardens, Pittsburgh, Pennsylvania, U.S.	
84	Win	63–16–5	Lee Sheppard	KO	1 (10)	Sep 19, 1941	Armory, Akron, Ohio, U.S.	
83	Win	62–16–5	Pete Galiano	TKO	6 (10)	Sep 8, 1941	Washington, Pennsylvania, U.S.	
82	Win	61–16–5	Jimmy Tygh	TKO	3 (10)	Aug 12, 1941	Forbes Field, Pittsburgh, Pennsylvania, U.S.	
81	Loss	60–16–5	Sugar Ray Robinson	UD	10	Jul 21, 1941	Shibe Park, Philadelphia, Pennsylvania, U.S.	
80	Win	60–15–5	Harry Hurst	MD	10	Jun 24, 1941	Maple Leaf Gardens, Toronto, Ontario, Canada	
79	Win	59–15–5	Lenny Mancini	MD	10	May 19, 1941	Public Hall, Cleveland, Ohio, U.S.	
78	Win	58–15–5	Dave Castilloux	PTS	12	May 2, 1941	Jefferson County Armory, Louisville, Kentucky, U.S.	
77	Win	57–15–5	Don Eddy	UD	10	Dec 18, 1940	Miami Field, Miami, Florida, U.S.	
76	Win	56–15–5	Bob Montgomery	MD	10	Nov 25, 1940	Arena, Philadelphia, Pennsylvania, U.S.	
75	Draw	55–15–5	George Latka	UD	10	Nov 4, 1940	Civic Auditorium, San Francisco, California, U.S.	
74	Loss	55–15–4	Fritzie Zivic	UD	10	Aug 29, 1940	Forbes Field, Pittsburgh, Pennsylvania, U.S.	
73	Win	55–14–4	Nick Castiglione	UD	10	Jul 24, 1940	Mills Stadium, Chicago, Illinois, U.S.	
72	Draw	54–14–4	Baby Arizmendi	PTS	10	Jun 25, 1940	Olympic Auditorium, Los Angeles, California, U.S.	
71	Win	54–14–3	Davey Day	PTS	15	May 5, 1940	Jefferson County Armory, Louisville, Kentucky, U.S.	Won vacant NBA lightweight title
70	Win	53–14–3	Quentin Breese	PTS	10	Mar 1, 1940	Madison Square Garden, New York City, New York, U.S.	
69	Draw	52–14–3	Pete Lello	PTS	10	Feb 2, 1940	Madison Square Garden, New York City, New York, U.S.	
68	Loss	52–14–2	Davey Day	MD	12	Dec 8, 1939	Chicago Stadium, Chicago, Illinois, U.S.	The Chicago Tribune called it an "unpopular decision"
67	Win	52–13–2	Baby Arizmendi	UD	10	Nov 3, 1939	Chicago Stadium, Chicago, Illinois, U.S.	
66	Win	51–13–2	Davey Day	SD	10	Oct 6, 1939	Chicago Stadium, Chicago, Illinois, U.S.	
65	Win	50–13–2	William Marquart	UD	10	Aug 28, 1939	Forbes Field, Pittsburgh, Pennsylvania, U.S.	
64	Win	49–13–2	Petey Sarron	PTS	10	Jul 17, 1939	Forbes Field, Pittsburgh, Pennsylvania, U.S.	
63	Win	48–13–2	Howard Scott	UD	10	Jun 26, 1939	Swiss Park Open Air Arena, Louisville, Kentucky, U.S.	
62	Win	47–13–2	Milt Aron	PTS	10	May 3, 1939	Coliseum, Chicago, Illinois, U.S.	
61	Win	46–13–2	Aldo Spoldi	PTS	10	Apr 14, 1939	Hippodrome, New York City, New York, U.S.	
60	Win	45–13–2	Eddie Brink	TKO	5 (10)	Jan 31, 1939	Motor Square Garden, Pittsburgh, Pennsylvania, U.S.	
59	Win	44–13–2	Joey Ferrando	TKO	10 (10)	Jan 23, 1939	Motor Square Garden, Pittsburgh, Pennsylvania, U.S.	
58	Win	43–13–2	Freddie Miller	UD	10	Dec 5, 1938	Columbia Gymnasium Arena, Louisville, Kentucky, U.S.	
57	Win	42–13–2	Norment Quarles	PTS	10	Nov 14, 1938	Municipal Auditorium, New Orleans, Louisiana, U.S.	
56	Win	41–13–2	Leo Rodak	UD	10	Sep 27, 1938	Motor Square Garden, Pittsburgh, Pennsylvania, U.S.	
55	Win	40–13–2	Wesley Ramey	UD	10	Sep 16, 1938	Sportatorium, Dallas, Texas, U.S.	
54	Win	39–13–2	Leo Rodak	TKO	1 (10)	Aug 15, 1938	Hickey Park, Millvale, Pennsylvania, U.S.	
53	Win	38–13–2	Nick Camarata	PTS	10	Aug 8, 1938	Marigold Gardens Outdoor Arena, Chicago, Illinois, U.S.	
52	Loss	37–13–2	Leo Rodak	SD	10	Jul 25, 1938	Forbes Field, Pittsburgh, Pennsylvania, U.S.	
51	Win	37–12–2	Tommy Speigal	UD	10	Jun 28, 1938	Hickey Park, Millvale, Pennsylvania, U.S.	
50	Win	36–12–2	Irving Eldridge	PTS	10	Jun 1, 1938	Hickey Park, Millvale, Pennsylvania, U.S.	
49	Win	35–12–2	Frankie Covelli	UD	10	May 23, 1938	Marigold Gardens, Chicago, Illinois, U.S.	
48	Win	34–12–2	Wesley Ramey	UD	10	May 6, 1938	Jefferson County Armory, Louisville, Kentucky, U.S.	
47	Win	33–12–2	Jackie Wilson	PTS	10	Mar 22, 1938	Auditorium, Milwaukee, Wisconsin, U.S.	
46	Win	32–12–2	Everett Simington	PTS	8	Feb 25, 1938	International Amphitheatre, Chicago, Illinois, U.S.	
45	Win	31–12–2	Harvey Woods	PTS	8	Feb 7, 1938	Marigold Gardens, Chicago, Illinois, U.S.	
44	Win	30–12–2	Lew Massey	PTS	10	Dec 6, 1937	Columbia Gymnasium Arena, Louisville, Kentucky, U.S.	
43	Loss	29–12–2	William Marquart	PTS	8	Nov 16, 1937	Chicago Stadium, Chicago, Illinois, U.S.	
42	Win	29–11–2	Wishy Jones	UD	10	Nov 8, 1937	Columbia Gymnasium Arena, Louisville, Kentucky, U.S.	Won USA Kentucky State lightweight title
41	Win	28–11–2	Jimmy Vaughn	MD	10	Oct 25, 1937	Columbia Gymnasium Arena, Louisville, Kentucky, U.S.	
40	Win	27–11–2	Johnny Pena	PTS	10	Oct 18, 1937	Marigold Gardens, Chicago, Illinois, U.S.	
39	Loss	26–11–2	William Marquart	SD	8	Sep 20, 1937	Marigold Gardens Outdoor Arena, Chicago, Illinois, U.S.	
38	Win	26–10–2	Jimmy Christy	PTS	10	Aug 23, 1937	Marigold Gardens Outdoor Arena, Chicago, Illinois, U.S.	
37	Win	25–10–2	Everette Rightmire	PTS	10	Aug 12, 1937	Riverview Rink, Milwaukee, Wisconsin, U.S.	
36	Win	24–10–2	Jimmy Christy	PTS	10	Jul 12, 1937	Marigold Gardens Outdoor Arena, Chicago, Illinois, U.S.	
35	Win	23–10–2	Roger Bernard	PTS	10	Jun 18, 1937	Riverview Rink, Milwaukee, Wisconsin, U.S.	
34	Win	22–10–2	Lloyd Pine	PTS	10	Jun 14, 1937	Marigold Gardens Outdoor Arena, Chicago, Illinois, U.S.	
33	Win	21–10–2	Pete Lello	TKO	5 (8)	Jun 2, 1937	Marigold Gardens Outdoor Arena, Chicago, Illinois, U.S.	
32	Win	20–10–2	George Fiest	PTS	6	May 17, 1937	Marigold Gardens Outdoor Arena, Chicago, Illinois, U.S.	
31	Win	19–10–2	Louis Gallup	TKO	4 (8)	May 10, 1937	Marigold Gardens Outdoor Arena, Chicago, Illinois, U.S.	
30	Win	18–10–2	Jimmy Buckler	PTS	10	Apr 19, 1937	Columbia Gymnasium Arena, Louisville, Kentucky, U.S.	
29	Win	17–10–2	Dave Barry	PTS	10	Mar 22, 1937	Columbia Gymnasium Arena, Louisville, Kentucky, U.S.	
28	Draw	16–10–2	Lloyd Pine	PTS	10	Mar 8, 1937	Columbia Gymnasium Arena, Louisville, Kentucky, U.S.	
27	Loss	16–10–1	Johnny Hutchinson	PTS	8	Feb 22, 1937	Motor Square Garden, Pittsburgh, Pennsylvania, U.S.	
26	Win	16–9–1	Lloyd Pine	SD	10	Dec 7, 1936	Columbia Gymnasium Arena, Louisville, Kentucky, U.S.	
25	Loss	15–9–1	Harry Krause	UD	8	Nov 23, 1936	Islam Grotto, Pittsburgh, Pennsylvania, U.S.	
24	Loss	15–8–1	Tommy Speigal	PTS	10	Nov 2, 1936	State Armory, Cumberland, Maryland, U.S.	
23	Loss	15–7–1	Lee Sheppard	SD	10	Oct 12, 1936	Islam Grotto, Pittsburgh, Pennsylvania, U.S.	
22	Loss	15–6–1	Lee Sheppard	MD	10	Sep 29, 1936	Moose Temple, Pittsburgh, Pennsylvania, U.S.	
21	Win	15–5–1	Lee Sheppard	TKO	4 (8)	Sep 14, 1936	Hickey Park, Millvale, Pennsylvania, U.S.	
20	Win	14–5–1	Harry Krause	SD	10	Sep 8, 1936	Hickey Park, Millvale, Pennsylvania, U.S.	
19	Loss	13–5–1	Tommy Speigal	SD	8	Aug 24, 1936	Hickey Park Bowl, Millvale, Pennsylvania, U.S.	
18	Win	13–4–1	Harry Krause	UD	8	Aug 10, 1936	Hickey Park, Millvale, Pennsylvania, U.S.	
17	Win	12–4–1	Billy Miller	MD	6	Jul 30, 1936	Forbes Field, Pittsburgh, Pennsylvania, U.S.	
16	Win	11–4–1	Victor Vallee	PTS	6	Jul 14, 1936	New York Coliseum, Bronx, New York City, New York, U.S.	
15	Loss	10–4–1	Eddie McGeever	PTS	8	Jun 22, 1936	Dyckman Oval, Manhattan, New York City, New York, U.S.	
14	Win	10–3–1	Joe Boscarino	PTS	10	Jun 2, 1936	Queensboro Arena, Long Island City, Queens, New York City, New York, U.S.	
13	Loss	9–3–1	Bobby Dean	PTS	6	May 11, 1936	Griffith Stadium, Washington, District of Columbia, U.S.	
12	Draw	9–2–1	Johnny Morro	PTS	8	May 5, 1936	New York Coliseum, Bronx, New York City, New York, U.S.	
11	Loss	9–2	Leonard Del Genio	PTS	8	Mar 25, 1936	Star Casino, New York City, New York, U.S.	
10	Win	9–1	Solly Ambrosio	PTS	6	Mar 11, 1936	Star Casino, New York City, New York, U.S.	
9	Win	8–1	Eddie Hannon	PTS	6	Jan 14, 1936	New York Coliseum, Bronx, New York City, New York, U.S.	
8	Win	7–1	Dick Cabello	PTS	6	Dec 31, 1935	New York Coliseum, Bronx, New York City, New York, U.S.	
7	Win	6–1	Al Farone	PTS	6	Nov 25, 1935	Northside Arena, Pittsburgh, Pennsylvania, U.S.	
6	Loss	5–1	Jackie Wilson	UD	6	Jul 22, 1935	Hickey Park, Millvale, Pennsylvania, U.S.	
5	Win	5–0	Jimmy Ferry	KO	1 (10)	Jun 26, 1935	Washington, Pennsylvania, U.S.	
4	Win	4–0	Al Gillette	PTS	6	May 14, 1935	New York Coliseum, Bronx, New York City, New York, U.S.	
3	Win	3–0	Charley Vaughn	PTS	6	Apr 30, 1935	New York Coliseum, Bronx, New York City, New York, U.S.	
2	Win	2–0	Long Sing Que	KO	2 (2)	Apr 23, 1935	New York Coliseum, Bronx, New York City, New York, U.S.	
1	Win	1–0	Tony Marengo	PTS	4	Mar 9, 1935	Ridgewood Grove, Brooklyn, New York City, New York, U.S.	

== Titles in boxing ==
=== Major world titles ===
- NYSAC lightweight champion (135 lbs)
- NBA (WBA) lightweight champion (135 lbs) (2×)

=== The Ring magazine titles ===
- The Ring lightweight champion (135 lbs)

=== Regional/International titles ===
- Kentucky State lightweight champion (135 lbs)

=== Undisputed titles ===
- Undisputed lightweight champion

== See also ==
- Lineal championship
- List of lightweight boxing champions

Achievements
Preceded by Lew Jenkins	NBA World Lightweight Champion; December 19, 1941 – November 1942; Vacated	Vacant Title next held by Ike Williams
Preceded by Vacant	NBA World Lightweight Champion; October 27, 1943 – March 8, 1944	Succeeded by Juan Zurita
