= Charles Pierce Davey =

American boxer

Charles Davey
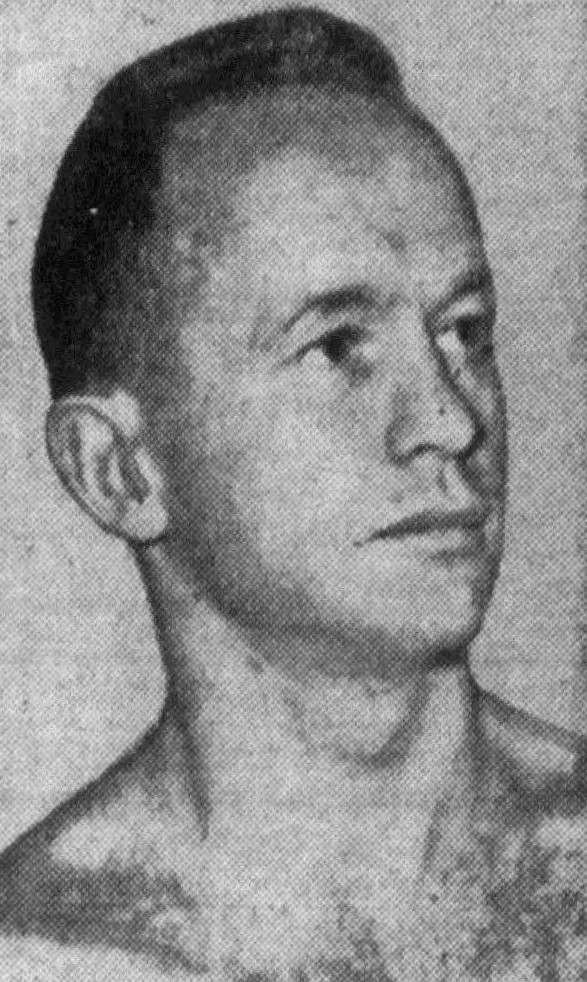
- Davey, circa 1954

Personal information
- Nickname: Chuck Davey
- Born: Charles Pierce Davey; May 3, 1925 Michigan, United States
- Died: December 4, 2002 (aged 77) Michigan, United States
- Weight: Welterweight

Boxing career
- Stance: Southpaw

Boxing record
- Total fights: 49
- Wins: 42
- Win by KO: 26
- Losses: 5
- Draws: 2

Charles Pierce "Chuck" Davey (May 3, 1925 – December 4, 2002) was an American welterweight boxer and boxing commissioner for the state of Michigan. Davey earned both a Bachelors and Masters degree from Michigan State University.He has been inducted into both the Michigan State University and the State of Michigan Sports Hall of Fames.

== Career ==
Davey's official record contains 42 winning bouts (including 26 knockouts), 5 losses (2 knockouts), and 2 draws. Some of his more notable opponents included Rocky Graziano, Ike Williams, and Carmen Basilio. He originally boxed for the Michigan State University team, was the only four time NCAA champion, and was a member of Team USA for boxing in the 1948 Summer Olympics.

Davey's style was considered unorthodox at the time because he was left-handed and often referred to as a southpaw. This initial upstart resulted in 39 straight wins until he met with Kid Gavilán (often written "Kid Gavilan" at the time) in 1953. The shadow of his first loss followed Davey for a long time:

Davey, a southpaw powderpuff puncher with fancy-Dan footwork, stayed on even terms with Gavilan for the first two rounds. In Round 3, Gavilan opened up with one of his famed flurries, pummeling with lefts, rights and his own uppercutting bolo punch. Davey, bewildered by the barrage, was dumped to the canvas for a nine count, the first time he had ever been knocked down. From then on it was just a matter of time, and Gavilan took his time. In Rounds 5 and 6, Gavilan switched styles and fought southpaw too, "just for the fun of it.

Shortly after the loss to Gavilan, Davey retired and spent some time as a sports announcer and was appointed Boxing Commissioner of Michigan by Governor George Romney. He was also active in the WBA and was the first President of the USBA. Davey developed a successful insurance agency, often employing retired Detroit celebrity athletes. He spent much of his time traveling and raising his family.

== Family ==
Davey was born to parents John Leo and Virginia. His mother's side of the family, her maiden name being Pierce, owned a large portion of land in Oscoda, Michigan on Lake Van Etten, which is located beside Wurtsmith Air Force Base. The Pierce family built cottages on a point of land jutting into the waters of Lake Van Etten, giving it the name "Pierce's Point." Davey was one of four siblings— older brother John Leo II, younger brother Berten Edward, and sister Margaret.

While Davey spent most of his youth and adulthood in the metro-Detroit area, he summered in Oscoda with his parents and brothers, his wife Patricia, and his nine children: Maureen, Charles Pierce II, Patrick, Cathleen, Colleen, Kerry, Laurie, Michael, and Joseph. In his spare time he traveled much of the world and maintained an active lifestyle, sometimes running marathons into his mid sixties and early seventies. He had 26 grandchildren.

== Accident and death ==
In 1998, while bodysurfing in the ocean, he was picked up by a wave and slammed onto the shore line. He broke a vertebra in his neck, leaving him paralyzed from the neck down. Davey died on December 4, 2002, at the age of 77, of complications resulting from his paralysis.
