= Mouzon =

Mouzon may refer to:

== Places in France ==
- Mouzon, Ardennes, a commune in the Ardennes department
- Mouzon, Charente, a commune in the Charente department
- Mouzon (river) the Mouzon river in Ardennes and Lorraine, France

== People ==
- Alphonse Mouzon (1948–2016), American jazz fusion drummer and percussionist
- Henry Mouzon (1741–1807), an important officer under Francis Marion in the South Carolina militia during the American Revolution
- Wesley Mouzon (1927–2003), professional boxer
