= Julie Kogon =

American boxer (1918–1986)

Personal information
- Nationality: American
- Born: Julius Kogon, Julius Kogan, rarely April 4, 1918 New Haven, Connecticut
- Died: December 20, 1986 (aged 68) Pompano Beach, Florida
- Height: 5 ft 7 in (1.70 m)
- Weight: Featherweight; Lightweight

Boxing career
- Stance: Orthodox

Boxing record
- Total fights: 137
- Wins: 81
- Win by KO: 36
- Losses: 38
- Draws: 17

Julie Kogon (1918–1986) was an American lightweight boxer and world title contender from New Haven, Connecticut.

Kogon was ranked by Nat Fleischer's Ring boxing magazine as the tenth best lightweight in the world for July 1944 and later won the Connecticut Lightweight Championship in January 1947. He came extremely close to becoming the New York State Boxing Commission's World Featherweight Championship when he defeated reigning champion Petey Scalzo in October 1940, placing him as one of the top ten or better contenders for two weight classes in a seven-year period. In the 1940s, he defeated both the European and Italian lightweight champion. Most exceptional was his losing only once by knockout in 142 bouts.

== Early life and early career highlights ==
Kogon was born to Jewish parents on April 4, 1918, to what would become a struggling family of five boys and five girls. He grew up on New Haven, Connecticut's Portsea Street. Earning a great deal of boxing experience as an amateur, Kogon amassed an exceptional 85-2 record. Beginning his professional career in 1937, he was one of several Jewish boxers to wear the six pointed Star of David on his boxing trunks below his initials throughout his career. Though religious symbols were later banned from boxer's sportswear, in the troubled world climate of the early 1940s Jewish boxers wearing the Star of David represented strength and the survival of their heritage to many of their Jewish fans. Some boxing analysts compared his vertical stance, with little crouching, to the great New York Jewish lightweight champion Benny Leonard who was also an idol of many Jewish fans. Kogon quickly earned an enthusiastic following in New Haven, and at one time appeared in 70 fights in the city, many to packed or full houses.

=== Win over World feather champ, Petey Scalzo, 1940 ===
Kogon went undefeated in his first 22 fights, with 17 wins, with 0 losses, 4 draws, and 1 no contest.

On June 6, 1939, he decisively defeated Tony Marteliano in a technical knockout in 1:10 of the fourth of an eight-round bout in Queens, New York. In Marteliano's first 37 fights, often with top competitors, Kogon was the first to achieve a knockout or even win a decision.

In a stunning upset, on October 4, 1940, he bested Petey Scalzo, reigning New York State Boxing Commission's World Featherweight Champion, in an eight-round points decision at Madison Square Garden. Scalzo was down in both the sixth and seventh rounds. Though both fighters fought under 131 pounds, very close to the featherweight range, Kogon was never recognized as a world featherweight championship, as he was a pound or two overweight.

==== Loss to European light champion, 1941 ====
On January 21, 1941, Kogon lost to the 1938 European lightweight champion, Italian boxer Aldo Spoldi, in an exciting and hard fought contest, at the arena in New Haven in a ten-round points decision. There were no knockdowns and according to the referee, Spoldi took six rounds, and Kogon three. Though Kogon performed well in the first three rounds, he tired in the fourth, fifth, and sixth, while Spoldi piled on points causing Kogon to clinch and hold. To the rising excitement of the crowd of 3000, Spoldi closed the contest in the final rounds by scoring frequently with left jabs and hooks.

In the five weeks from October 5 to November 15, of 1943, Kogon won five consecutive fights by knockout. Shortly after, the manager of the reigning New York World lightweight champion Beau Jack, Chick Wergeles, turned down an offer of 10,000 from promoter John Attell, for Jack to defend his championship against Kogon in his hometown of New London. Though Wergeles said he turned it down because he could get far more if the fight took place in New York, it seems equally likely he feared risking Jack's lightweight title after he watched Kogon complete his fifth consecutive knockout against Buster Beaupre in New Haven that December.

Before a record crowd of 7,751 on June 6, 1944, he fought the legendary featherweight Willie Pep in an extraordinary bout in Hartford, Connecticut, though he lost in an eight-round decision. Pep was given eight rounds by one of the judges.

== World light champ Ike Williams, 1944 ==
On July 20, 1944, Kogon faced the great black 1946 NBA New York world lightweight champion Ike Williams before a sizable crowd of 6,500 at Madison Square Garden, and lost in a ten-round unanimous decision. Some boxing analysts faulted Kogon for gaining an advantage over an injured Williams in the sixth and seventh but not adequately following up. When Kogon landed a right on Williams in the sixth after breaking from a clutch, he stepped back instead of following his advantage and in the seventh when he again landed some effective rights, he again stepped back. Kogon had a two-pound advantage in weight, but a two-inch disadvantage in height, which may have played a greater role in his cautious self-defense, or he may have simply appreciated the extraordinary skill of the future world lightweight champion.

In the remaining rounds, Williams did most of the punching and gained an advantage in points. In the tenth and final round, Kogon grabbed Williams by the waist after receiving a blow and moved him across the ring, finally landing on top of him as both boxers tripped on the ropes. The referee completed a count of six before the boxers were back on their feet. The judges sided more strongly with Williams giving no more than two rounds to Kogon.

== New England light champ, 1947 ==
On January 6, 1947, Kogon captured the New England lightweight title when he won a twelve-round points decision from Pat Demers at the Arena in New Haven before his loyal hometown audience who were thrilled with the decision. Both men weighed in as lightweights at 135.

In front of 5000 fans on March 17, 1947, LuLu Constantino lost decisively to Kogon at his most common venue, the Arena in New Haven in a ten-round points decision. Kogon won with effective counter-punching, giving him nine of the ten rounds according to the referee's scoring. He had an exceptional night and capped his fifth consecutive victory.

On July 9, 1947, he retained the New England lightweight title when he stopped Greek boxer Nick Stato in a 12th-round knockout at the Auditorium in Hartford, Connecticut, six months after first taking it from Demers. With little more than a minute left in the final round in the outdoor arena, Kogon dealt two crushing rights to the jaw, and Stato pitched forward to the mat and was counted out by the referee. Stato was also down for the count of nine in the second, as well as at the start of the third. The bout may have ended after the second, but Stato had a chance to rest as the bell sounded at the count of nine. Stato fought back bravely in an exciting rally in the fourth through the seventh rounds. Kogon, however, won the eight and ninth rounds with sharp, well-placed rights. With the typical blood lust of the brutal sport, fans heaped verbal abuse on Kogon as they remembered his more timid fight against Willie Pep in the same stadium three years earlier. Only 1782 fans paid to see the bout whose attendance suffered from a one-day postponement, though it was an exciting and skillfully fought display. Kogon dominated in his boxing skills, speed, endurance and punching ability, but the courage of Stato made the fight.

== World light champ Bob Montgomery, 1947 ==
On June 2, 1947, in New Haven, Kogon met the accomplished Bob Montgomery, reigning New York Boxing Commission's world lightweight champion, and fought a close, skillful, well paced match. In another slight to Kogon's boxing legacy, the bout was not a title match. In perhaps his most significant late career bouts, Kogon appeared to lead through the first eight rounds, but his championship opponent pulled ahead with a furious body attack in the last two rounds to win on points. At least five of the rounds were judged as close with Kogon taking the lead in three. Once again, Kogon performed well against the best in his weight class but failed to close at the end. He had met Montgomery twice in 1941, in Chicago and Brooklyn, losing both times on points. In their October 25, 1941, bout in Chicago before a substantial audience of 4,500, Montgomery "pressed a punishing body attack throughout the bout", for a decisive ten-round decision. Kogon fought with quality defensive skill winning three rounds in the contest.

== Win over light champ of Italy, Aldo Minelli, 1947 ==
On August 4, 1947, Kogon defeated Italian boxer Aldo Minelli, a claimant to Italy's lightweight championship in a ten-round points decision in West Haven, Connecticut. An angry group of the 4,500 fans present at the bout kicked and scratched Lou Bogash, the referee as he walked from the ring after the fight. On September 8, 1947, Kogon drew with Minelli at New Haven in 10 rounds. Two weeks later on September 22, Minelli defeated Kogan in a twelve-round points decision before a smaller crowd of 3,000 in a fight that was described as "dull".

== Loss to light champ Jimmy Carter, 1948 ==
On July 26, 1948, Kogon met future three time world lightweight champion Jimmy Carter as the main feature at Century Stadium in Springfield, Massachusetts, and lost by technical knockout in the seventh of ten rounds. It was impressively Kogon's only loss by knockout in 133 professional fights. Kogon was down briefly in the fourth, and for a count of nine in the fifth. He announced his retirement shortly after the bout, but boxed on through 1950.

Kogon's last bout and final loss came to Teddy Davis in a ten-round points decision at the Arena in New Haven, Connecticut on May 22, 1950, in a ten-round points decision. A light crowd of only 496 watched as the referee gave Davis seven rounds, Kogon two, and left one even. An aging Kogon tried to show aggressiveness in the ring, but retreated or clinched after most of his best rights or few punching flurries. The referee was former Connecticut state welterweight boxing champion, Lou Bogash.

== Life after boxing ==
Shortly before his boxing retirement, Kogon bought a New Haven lunch restaurant on Norton Street. After selling it, he worked as a salesman for a Ford dealership.

After his professional career ended, Kogon worked as an instructor of intramural boxing at Yale. Head boxing coach at the top rated University was former Jewish boxer Mosey King, Connecticut's first boxing commissioner and a one-time New England Lightweight champion himself.

He died on December 20, 1986, in Pampano Beach, Florida, at the age of 68, leaving two children and four grandchildren. Services were at the Star of David Funeral Chapel in the city of Fort Lauderdale, Florida, where he was buried in the Garden of Sinai Cemetery.

== Selected fights ==
5 Wins, 4 Losses
Result	Opponent(s)	Date	Location	Duration	Notes
Win	Tony Marteliano	Jun 6, 1939	Queens, NY	4th Round TKO	Future fly champion
Win	Petey Scalzo	Oct 4, 1940	New York	8 Rounds	Scalzo - World feather champ Non-title
Loss	Aldo Spoldi	Jan 21, 1941	New Haven, CT	10 Rounds	Former Italian Light champ
Loss	Willie Pep	Jun 6, 1944	Hartford, CT	8 Rounds	Pep- World feather champ Non-title
Loss	Ike Williams	Jul 20, 1944	New York	10 Rounds UD	Pep- Future World light champ
Win	Pat Demers	Jan 6, 1947	New Haven, CT	12 Rounds	Won New England light title
Win	LuLu Constantino	Mar 17, 1947	New Haven, CT	10 Rounds	
Win	Nick Stato	Jul 9, 1947	New Haven, CT	12 Round KO	Kept New England light title
Loss	Jimmy Carter	Jul 26, 1948	Springfield, MA	7 Round TKO(br)Kogon's only KO loss	Future World light champ

== Achievements and honors ==
Achievements
Preceded by Defeated Petey Scalzo; Kogon one pound over weight	World Featherweight Championship Contender; 4 October 1940	Succeeded by Richie Lemos
Preceded by Pat Demers, Nick Stato	Two Time; USA New England Lightweight Champion; 1 June 1947 – 22 September 1947	Succeeded by Aldo Minelli
Preceded by Aldo Minelli	Defeated Italian Lightweight Champion; Aldo Minelli; 4 June 1947	Succeeded by Unknown

Kogon was inducted into The Connecticut Boxing Hall of Fame on November 21, 2009.

== See also ==
- List of select Jewish boxers
