= MoSo =

Annual event in Saskatchewan, Canada

MoSo was a music and technology event that was held annually in Saskatoon, Saskatchewan in Canada beginning in 2011, with its final event in 2016. It was divided into two parts held concurrently: a technology conference known as MoSo Conf (the name MoSo is derived from the term "Mobile Social"), and a music festival known as MoSo Fest. Technology-related sessions took place during the day Thursday to Saturday; musical performances were held at night from Wednesday to Sunday, and a daytime outdoor stage was added in 2014 accompanied by several food carts. The event typically took place in the second or third week of June.

Artists who have performed at MoSo Fest include Timber Timbre, We Are the City, Rah Rah, Ladyhawk and Astronautalis.

After the 2016 event, it was announced that MoSo would not be continuing, due to its financial situation.
