= Mozo (surname) =

Mozo is a Spanish surname. Notable people with the name include:

- Alan Mozo (born 1997), Mexican association football player
- Alejandro Gutiérrez Mozo (born 1995), Spanish association football player
- Belén Mozo (born 1988), Spanish professional golfer
- Nicolás de Vergara el Mozo (1540–1606), Spanish sculptor, architect, ironworker and glazier

== See also ==
- Mouzo, surname
