= Wesley Mouzon =

American boxer

Wesley Mouzon (August 15, 1927 – July 1, 2003) was a professional boxer.

Born in Kingstree, South Carolina, Mouzon moved as a child to Philadelphia, long considered one of the best boxing school cities in the United States. In Philadelphia, he learned how to box.

Mouzon is better known in the boxing world for his results against two former world champions: Ike Williams and Bob Montgomery. He drew with Williams, and beat Montgomery by knockout. His career had a sudden finish, however, when rematched with Montgomery: He lost by knockout in their second bout, and suffered a detached retina. At the time, detached retinas meant automatic retirement for fighters, and Mouzon had to retire at the young age of 19. He had a record of 23 wins, 3 losses and 1 draw, with 9 wins by knockout.

Mouzon went on to train some recognizable boxing figures, such as the former two time world champion Dwight Muhammad Qawi (whom he also managed), Roy Jones Jr. title challenger Tony Thornton and Vinnie Burgese, the latter of whom called Mouzon the best trainer he had.

On July 1, 2003, he died from kidney cancer.
