= Sonny Boy West =

American boxer

Al West (May 13, 1929 – December 21, 1950), alias Sonny Boy, was a lightweight professional boxer from Maryland. He was a native of Washington, D.C.

== Professional career ==
West made his professional debut on November 29, 1946, a two-round knockout win against George Junior. He won his first nine professional matches before losing to Harry LaSane on August 11, 1947, a loss which he avenged just fourteen days later. West's final record was 46 wins (14 by knockout), 8 losses, and 1 draw in 55 fights. In his short career West fought such important names as Stonewall Jackson, Jimmy Carter, Redtop Davis, Sammy Angott, Ike Williams, Charley Salas, and Mario Pacheco.

== Death ==
The career and life of Sonny Boy West ended with a beating at the hands of Percy Bassett, which caused bleeding in the brain. According to boxrec.com, "West complained of double vision between the 6th and 7th rounds. After he was hurt to the body by Bassett, he was floored by a right hand. As he fell, he landed hard on his head. West died of injuries suffered in this bout on December 21st. The official cause of death was given as a 'inter-cerebral hemorrhage resulting from a cerebral concussion.'"
