= Willie Joyce =

American boxer

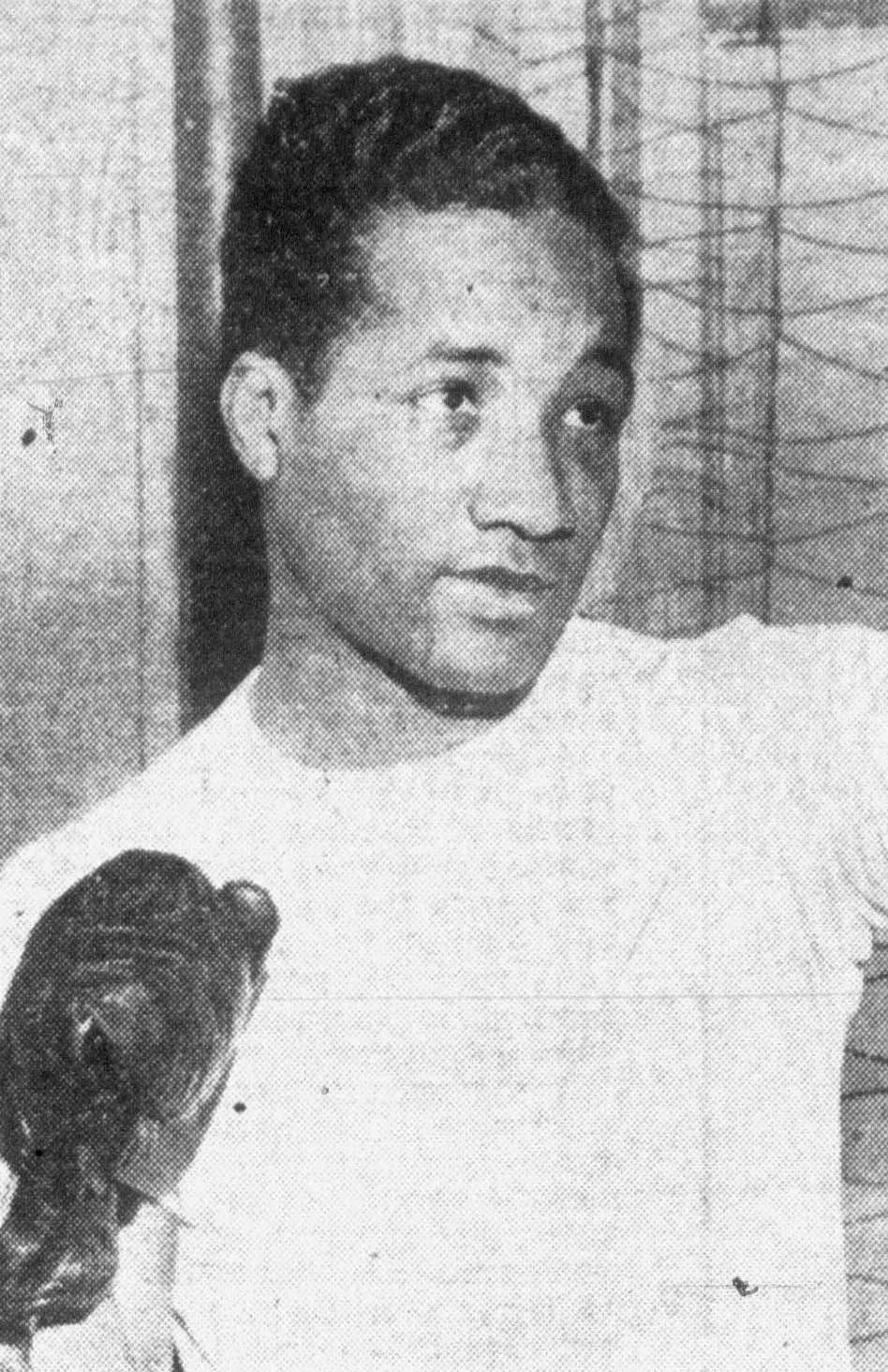

Personal information
- Nationality: American
- Born: William Joyce; September 2, 1917 Gary, Indiana, U.S.
- Died: December 5, 1996 (aged 79)
- Weight: Light Welterweight

Boxing career
- Stance: Orthodox

Boxing record
- Total fights: 103
- Wins: 71
- Win by KO: 16
- Losses: 21
- Draws: 10
- No contests: 1

Willie Joyce (September 2, 1917 – December 5, 1996) was an American boxer from Chicago. He was the 1936 National AAU Bantamweight champion, and the 1937 (126 lb) Chicago & Intercity Golden Gloves Champion.

Joyce was 24-1-4 in 1937 to 1939 only losing to Frankie Covelli. He fought Lew Jenkins at the White City Arena in Chicago three times in 1939, battling to a draw in their first bout and winning the next two by split decision.

He fought Henry Armstrong four times in 1943 and 1944. In the first match he beat Armstrong at the Olympic Auditoriumin Los Angeles. The second fight he lost to Armstrong at the Gilmore Stadium, also in Los Angeles. The third fight he beat Armstrong at Chicago Stadium. In their final meeting Armstrong was the victor beating Joyce at the Civic Auditorium in San Francisco.

Joyce also fought Willie Pep. Pep beat Joyce at Comiskey Park in Chicago in 1944. In 1944 and 1945, Joyce went 3–1 against Ike Williams and in 1945, split two bouts with Chalky Wright.

Joyce would go on to face Tippy Larkin in three fights, losing all three by decision. In their second fight, Larkin beat Joyce for the vacant World Jr. Welterweight Title at the Boston Garden. In their third fight, Joyce lost to Larkin for the World Jr. Welterweight Title at Madison Square Garden in New York.

Joyce also fought Johnny Bratton at the Chicago Stadium in 1946, losing in both fights.

== Professional boxing record ==
103 fights	71 wins	21 losses
By knockout	16	0
By decision	55	21
Draws	10	
No contests	1	

No.	Result	Record	Opponent	Type	Round	Date	Location	Notes
103	Loss	71–21–10 (1)	Johnny Cesario	SD	10	Mar 24, 1947	Arena, Boston, Massachusetts, U.S.	
102	Draw	71–20–10 (1)	Ernie Petrone	PTS	10	Jan 13, 1947	Arena, New Haven, Connecticut, U.S.	
101	Loss	71–20–9 (1)	Johnny Bratton	UD	10	Dec 20, 1946	Chicago Stadium, Chicago, Illinois, U.S.	
100	Win	71–19–9 (1)	Nick Castiglione	UD	10	Nov 15, 1946	Chicago Stadium, Chicago, Illinois, U.S.	
99	Loss	70–19–9 (1)	Johnny Bratton	SD	10	Oct 31, 1946	Chicago Stadium, Chicago, Illinois, U.S.	
98	Loss	70–18–9 (1)	Tippy Larkin	UD	12	Sep 13, 1946	Madison Square Garden, Manhattan, New York City, New York, U.S.	For NYSAC and NBA light-welterweight titles
97	Win	70–17–9 (1)	Danny Kapilow	UD	10	Aug 2, 1946	Madison Square Garden, Manhattan, New York City, New York, U.S.	
96	Win	69–17–9 (1)	Maxie Starr	UD	10	Jul 24, 1946	Rhode Island Auditorium, Providence, Rhode Island, U.S.	
95	Loss	68–17–9 (1)	Tippy Larkin	UD	12	Apr 29, 1946	Boston Garden, Boston, Massachusetts, U.S.	For vacant NYSAC and NBA light-welterweight titles
94	NC	68–16–9 (1)	Jimmy Hatcher	NC	6 (10)	Apr 16, 1946	Maple Leaf Gardens, Toronto, Ontario, Canada	
93	Win	68–16–9	Ruby Garcia	KO	2 (10)	Apr 9, 1946	Municipal Auditorium, Kansas City, Missouri, U.S.	
92	Win	67–16–9	Bobby Zollo	UD	10	Mar 25, 1946	Boston Garden, Boston, Massachusetts, U.S.	
91	Draw	66–16–9	Danny Kapilow	PTS	10	Mar 15, 1946	Madison Square Garden, Manhattan, New York City, New York, U.S.	
90	Win	66–16–8	Jackie Wilson	TKO	5 (10)	Mar 11, 1946	Uline Arena, Washington, D.C., U.S.	
89	Win	65–16–8	Allie Stolz	SD	10	Feb 15, 1946	Madison Square Garden, Manhattan, New York City, New York, U.S.	
88	Loss	64–16–8	Beau Jack	UD	10	Dec 14, 1945	Madison Square Garden, Manhattan, New York City, New York, U.S.	
87	Win	64–15–8	Joey Barnum	UD	10	Nov 23, 1945	Chicago Stadium, Chicago, Illinois, U.S.	
86	Loss	63–15–8	Allie Stolz	UD	10	Nov 12, 1945	Madison Square Garden, Manhattan, New York City, New York, U.S.	
85	Draw	63–14–8	Joey Barnum	PTS	10	Oct 19, 1945	Chicago Stadium, Chicago, Illinois, U.S.	
84	Win	63–14–7	Danny Bartfield	RTD	6 (10)	Sep 14, 1945	Madison Square Garden, Manhattan, New York City, New York, U.S.	
83	Win	62–14–7	Morris Reif	UD	10	Aug 20, 1945	Griffith Stadium, Washington, D.C., U.S.	
82	Loss	61–14–7	Tippy Larkin	UD	10	Aug 3, 1945	Madison Square Garden, Manhattan, New York City, New York, U.S.	
81	Win	61–13–7	Bobby Ruffin	SD	12	Jul 13, 1945	Madison Square Garden, Manhattan, New York City, New York, U.S.	
80	Win	60–13–7	Dave Freeman	UD	10	Jun 20, 1945	Arena Stadium, Philadelphia, Pennsylvania, U.S.	
79	Win	59–13–7	Ike Williams	SD	10	Jun 8, 1945	Madison Square Garden, Manhattan, New York City, New York, U.S.	
78	Win	58–13–7	Genaro Rojo	UD	10	May 1, 1945	Olympic Auditorium, Los Angeles, California, U.S.	
77	Loss	57–13–7	Chalky Wright	UD	10	Apr 17, 1945	Olympic Auditorium, Los Angeles, California, U.S.	
76	Win	57–12–7	Ike Williams	UD	12	Mar 2, 1945	Madison Square Garden, Manhattan, New York City, New York, U.S.	
75	Win	56–12–7	Chalky Wright	UD	10	Feb 5, 1945	Arena, Philadelphia, Pennsylvania, U.S.	
74	Loss	55–12–7	Ike Williams	UD	12	Jan 8, 1945	Convention Hall, Philadelphia, Pennsylvania, U.S.	
73	Win	55–11–7	Ike Williams	SD	10	Nov 13, 1944	Arena, Philadelphia, Pennsylvania, U.S.	
72	Win	54–11–7	Chester Slider	PTS	10	Sep 27, 1944	Auditorium, Oakland, California, U.S.	
71	Win	53–11–7	Chester Slider	PTS	10	Sep 6, 1944	Auditorium, Oakland, California, U.S.	
70	Loss	52–11–7	Henry Armstrong	PTS	10	Aug 21, 1944	Civic Auditorium, San Francisco, California, U.S.	
69	Loss	52–10–7	Willie Pep	UD	10	Jul 7, 1944	Comiskey Park, Chicago, Illinois, U.S.	
68	Win	52–9–7	Henry Armstrong	UD	10	Jun 2, 1944	Chicago Stadium, Chicago, Illinois, U.S.	
67	Win	51–9–7	Pete Lello	RTD	7 (10)	May 22, 1944	Civic Auditorium, San Francisco, California, U.S.	
66	Win	50–9–7	Ray Lunny	KO	8 (12)	May 2, 1944	Olympic Auditorium, Los Angeles, California, U.S.	Won USA California State lightweight title
65	Loss	49–9–7	John Thomas	UD	10	Mar 21, 1944	Olympic Auditorium, Los Angeles, California, U.S.	
64	Loss	49–8–7	Leo Rodak	UD	10	Mar 3, 1944	Legion Stadium, Hollywood, California, U.S.	
63	Win	49–7–7	Jerry Moore	PTS	10	Feb 11, 1944	Civic Auditorium, San Francisco, California, U.S.	
62	Win	48–7–7	Vic Grupico	TKO	5 (10)	Jan 17, 1944	Civic Auditorium, San Francisco, California, U.S.	
61	Loss	47–7–7	Henry Armstrong	UD	10	Jul 24, 1943	Gilmore Stadium, Los Angeles, California, U.S.	
60	Win	47–6–7	Henry Armstrong	MD	10	Mar 2, 1943	Olympic Auditorium, Los Angeles, California, U.S.	
59	Win	46–6–7	John Thomas	MD	12	Feb 9, 1943	Olympic Auditorium, Los Angeles, California, U.S.	
58	Loss	45–6–7	Slugger White	UD	15	Jan 4, 1943	Coliseum, Baltimore, Maryland, U.S.	For vacant Maryland world lightweight title
57	Win	45–5–7	Leo Rodak	TKO	4 (10)	Dec 14, 1942	Arena Gardens, Detroit, Michigan, U.S.	
56	Win	44–5–7	Carmen Notch	MD	10	Oct 26, 1942	Arena Gardens, Detroit, Michigan, U.S.	
55	Win	43–5–7	Slugger White	PTS	12	Sep 25, 1942	Victory Arena, New Orleans, Louisiana, U.S.	Won vacant 'Negro' lightweight title
54	Win	42–5–7	Joey Peralta	PTS	10	Aug 27, 1942	Comiskey Park, Chicago, Illinois, U.S.	
53	Win	41–5–7	Harvey Dubs	UD	12	Jul 27, 1942	Northside Arena, Chicago, Illinois, U.S.	
52	Win	40–5–7	Harvey Dubs	UD	10	Jul 6, 1942	Northside Arena, Chicago, Illinois, U.S.	
51	Win	39–5–7	Carmelo Fenoy	PTS	10	Jun 12, 1942	Comiskey Park, Chicago, Illinois, U.S.	
50	Win	38–5–7	Matt Dougherty	PTS	8	Jun 8, 1942	Marigold Gardens Outdoor Arena, Chicago, Illinois, U.S.	
49	Win	37–5–7	Mike Evans	PTS	10	May 18, 1942	Marigold Gardens Outdoor Arena, Chicago, Illinois, U.S.	
48	Win	36–5–7	Tony Ferrara	PTS	10	Apr 27, 1942	Marigold Gardens, Chicago, Illinois, U.S.	
47	Win	35–5–7	Sammy Secreet	PTS	10	Apr 13, 1942	Marigold Gardens, Chicago, Illinois, U.S.	
46	Win	34–5–7	Jimmy Maddox	TKO	1 (8)	Mar 23, 1942	Marigold Gardens, Chicago, Illinois, U.S.	
45	Loss	33–5–7	Tony Motisi	UD	10	Feb 9, 1942	Marigold Gardens, Chicago, Illinois, U.S.	
44	Win	33–4–7	Billy Davis	PTS	10	Jan 19, 1942	Marigold Gardens, Chicago, Illinois, U.S.	
43	Loss	32–4–7	Sammy Secreet	SD	10	Dec 15, 1941	Marigold Gardens, Chicago, Illinois, U.S.	
42	Draw	32–3–7	Aldo Spoldi	PTS	10	Nov 24, 1941	Marigold Gardens, Chicago, Illinois, U.S.	
41	Win	32–3–6	Ted Christie	KO	2 (10)	Nov 10, 1941	Marigold Gardens, Chicago, Illinois, U.S.	
40	Win	31–3–6	Quentin Breese	PTS	10	Sep 24, 1941	Chicago Stadium Outdoor Arena, Chicago, Illinois, U.S.	
39	Win	30–3–6	Leonard Bennett	PTS	10	Aug 13, 1941	Chicago Stadium Outdoor Arena, Chicago, Illinois, U.S.	
38	Win	29–3–6	Harvey Dubs	PTS	10	Jul 14, 1941	Marigold Gardens Outdoor Arena, Chicago, Illinois, U.S.	
37	Win	28–3–6	Nick Castiglione	PTS	8	Jun 16, 1941	Marigold Gardens Outdoor Arena, Chicago, Illinois, U.S.	
36	Loss	27–3–6	Joe Ghnouly	MD	10	Dec 9, 1940	Civic Center, Hammond, Indiana, U.S.	
35	Draw	27–2–6	Jorge Morelia	PTS	8	Jul 19, 1940	White City Arena, Chicago, Illinois, U.S.	
34	Win	27–2–5	Jorge Morelia	KO	1 (8)	Jul 12, 1940	White City Arena, Chicago, Illinois, U.S.	
33	Win	26–2–5	Joey Silva	TKO	8 (10)	Jun 5, 1940	Coliseum, Chicago, Illinois, U.S.	
32	Loss	25–2–5	Jorge Morelia	MD	10	May 17, 1940	White City Arena, Chicago, Illinois, U.S.	
31	Win	25–1–5	Nick Castiglione	PTS	8	Apr 5, 1940	White City Arena, Chicago, Illinois, U.S.	
30	Draw	24–1–5	Young Kid McCoy	SD	8	Jan 22, 1940	Marigold Gardens, Chicago, Illinois, U.S.	
29	Win	24–1–4	Félix Garcia	PTS	8	Dec 23, 1939	Rockland Palace, Manhattan, New York City, New York, U.S.	
28	Draw	23–1–4	Willie Cheatum	PTS	8	Dec 2, 1939	Rockland Palace, Manhattan, New York City, New York, U.S.	
27	Win	23–1–3	Herbie Gilmore	KO	2 (8)	Nov 18, 1939	Rockland Palace, Manhattan, New York City, New York, U.S.	
26	Win	22–1–3	Frankie Terranova	PTS	8	Sep 28, 1939	Fort Hamilton Arena, Brooklyn, New York City, New York, U.S.	
25	Win	21–1–3	Joe De Jesus	PTS	8	Sep 14, 1939	Fort Hamilton Arena, Brooklyn, New York City, New York, U.S.	
24	Win	20–1–3	Maxie Fisher	KO	2 (10)	Aug 2, 1939	White City Arena, Chicago, Illinois, U.S.	
23	Win	19–1–3	Earl Gibbs	PTS	8	Jul 17, 1939	Marigold Gardens Outdoor Arena, Chicago, Illinois, U.S.	
22	Win	18–1–3	Lew Jenkins	SD	8	Feb 24, 1939	White City Arena, Chicago, Illinois, U.S.	
21	Win	17–1–3	Lew Jenkins	SD	8	Feb 17, 1939	White City Arena, Chicago, Illinois, U.S.	
20	Draw	16–1–3	Lew Jenkins	SD	10	Jan 20, 1939	White City Arena, Chicago, Illinois, U.S.	
19	Win	16–1–2	Bobby McIntire	PTS	10	Jan 6, 1939	White City Arena, Chicago, Illinois, U.S.	
18	Draw	15–1–2	Bobby McIntire	PTS	10	Dec 21, 1938	Park Casino, Chicago, Illinois, U.S.	
17	Win	15–1–1	Sammy Scully	PTS	8	Nov 28, 1938	Gary, Indiana, U.S.	
16	Win	14–1–1	Armando Sicilia	PTS	10	Nov 23, 1938	Park Casino, Chicago, Illinois, U.S.	
15	Loss	13–1–1	Frankie Covelli	SD	10	Oct 28, 1938	White City Arena, Chicago, Illinois, U.S.	
14	Win	13–0–1	Frankie Covelli	UD	10	Sep 23, 1938	White City Arena, Chicago, Illinois, U.S.	
13	Win	12–0–1	Billy Miller	TKO	5 (8)	Jul 25, 1938	Marigold Gardens Outdoor Arena, Chicago, Illinois, U.S.	
12	Win	11–0–1	George van der Heyden	PTS	8	Jun 20, 1938	Marigold Gardens Outdoor Arena, Chicago, Illinois, U.S.	
11	Win	10–0–1	George van der Heyden	PTS	5	May 31, 1938	Marigold Gardens Outdoor Arena, Chicago, Illinois, U.S.	
10	Win	9–0–1	Frankie Agnes	PTS	5	May 2, 1938	Marigold Gardens, Chicago, Illinois, U.S.	
9	Win	8–0–1	Frankie Agnes	PTS	5	Apr 4, 1938	Marigold Gardens, Chicago, Illinois, U.S.	
8	Win	7–0–1	Billy Sparks	TKO	4 (5)	Mar 14, 1938	Marigold Gardens, Chicago, Illinois, U.S.	
7	Win	6–0–1	Gene Spencer	TKO	3 (5)	Feb 11, 1938	Rainbo Arena, Chicago, Illinois, U.S.	
6	Win	5–0–1	Sammy Scully	PTS	5	Jan 31, 1938	Marigold Gardens, Chicago, Illinois, U.S.	
5	Win	4–0–1	Gene Spencer	PTS	4	Jan 3, 1938	Marigold Gardens, Chicago, Illinois, U.S.	
4	Win	3–0–1	Sammy Scully	PTS	5	Dec 20, 1937	Marigold Gardens, Chicago, Illinois, U.S.	
3	Draw	2–0–1	Sammy Scully	PTS	4	Dec 13, 1937	Marigold Gardens, Chicago, Illinois, U.S.	
2	Win	2–0	Ray Harris	PTS	4	Nov 22, 1937	Marigold Gardens, Chicago, Illinois, U.S.	
1	Win	1–0	Battling Raymond	PTS	4	Nov 10, 1937	Memorial Auditorium, Gary, Indiana, U.S.	
