= Beau Jack =

American boxer

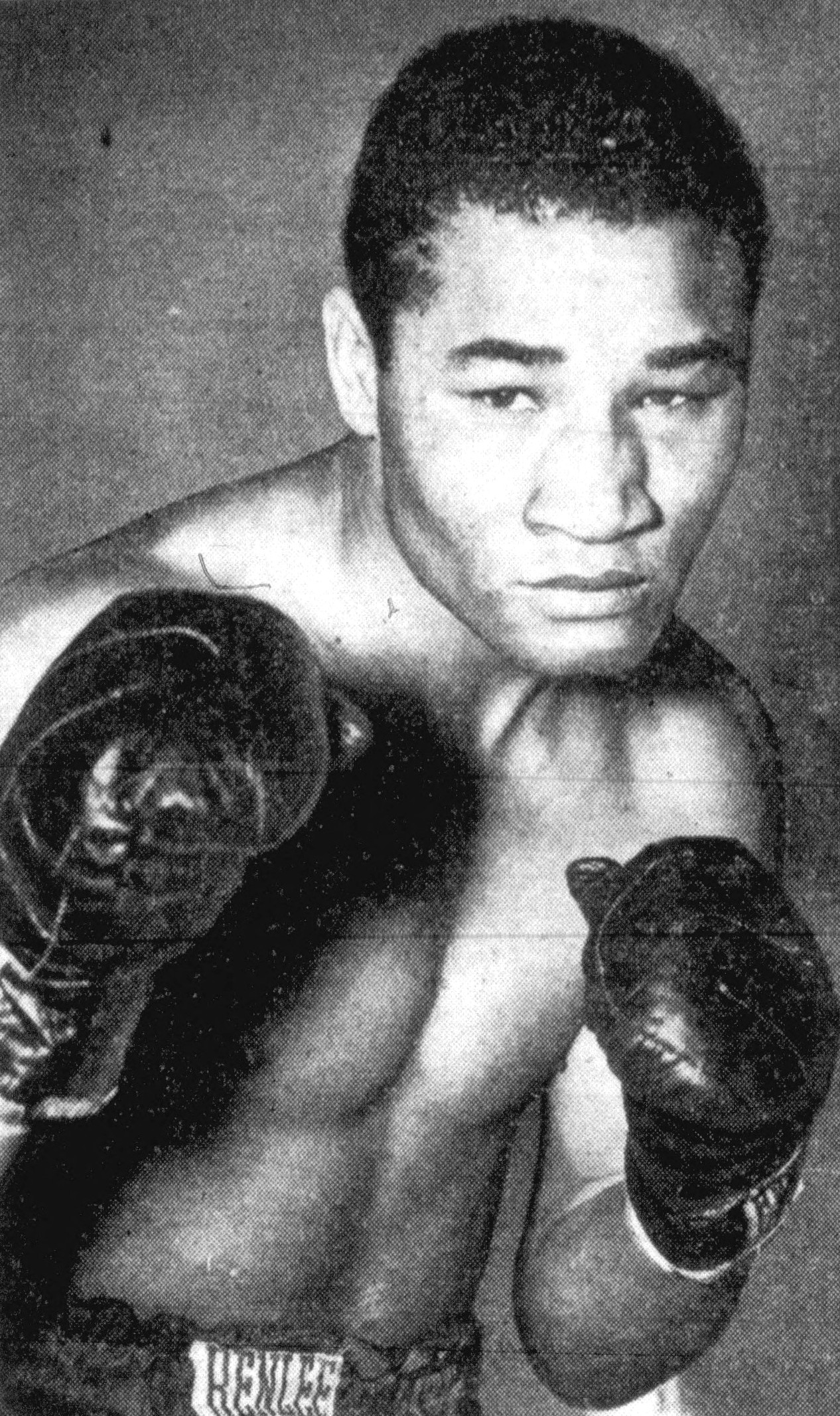
- Jack, circa 1949

Personal information
- Born: Sidney Walker; April 1, 1921 Waynesboro, Georgia
- Died: February 9, 2000 (aged 78) Miami, Florida
- Height: 5 ft 6 in (1.68 m)
- Weight: Lightweight

Boxing career
- Reach: 68.5 in (174 cm)
- Stance: Orthodox

Boxing record
- Total fights: 121
- Wins: 91
- Win by KO: 44
- Losses: 24
- Draws: 5
- No contests: 1

Beau Jack (born Sidney Walker; April 1, 1921 – February 9, 2000) was an American lightweight boxer and two-time world lightweight champion in the 1940s. One of the most popular fighters during the War Years, he headlined at Madison Square Garden on 21 occasions, a record that still stands.

== Early years ==
Sidney Walker was born in Waynesboro, Georgia on April 1, 1921. After the death of his mother he moved to Augusta, and stayed with his grandmother, Evie Mixom, who affectionately called him "Beau Jack". He grew up during the Depression on a ragged farm where he worked the fields, and in the evening would work as a shoe-shine boy. A few days a week he would arise early, walk three miles into town and shine shoes till dusk. To make extra money, he would engage in battle royales, which consisted of five to ten boys, usually Black, fighting each other, often blindfolded, until only one remained standing. The winner was given a purse by the white organizers.

Following his first battle royale at the Augusta National Golf Club, Jack accepted a position as a caddie there. He quickly befriended some of the club's members, including golfing legend Bobby Jones, who helped fund his boxing training.

== Boxing career ==
Jack turned professional in 1940, and began his career fighting in Massachusetts where he established an impressive record of 27–4–2. During this period, he earned his reputation as a relentless and powerful fighter, essential traits that endeared him to his fans and won over admirers.

== First taking the NYSAC World Lightweight Championship, December 1942 ==
He moved to New York City in August 1941, where he continued to impress under the management of Chick Wergeles. In November 1942, he found himself in a fight against Allie Stolz at Madison Square Garden to determine who would challenge for the New York version of the world lightweight title.

Going into the fight, Stolz was the clear favorite, with 3-1 odds. Before an enthusiastic crowd, Jack staged an upset, winning the match with a technical knockout of Stolz in the seventh round. Stoltz had cuts on his left eyelid and eyebrow that led the referee to end the bout.

In his first NYSAC Lightweight Title bout against Tippy Larkin on December 18, 1942, Jack surprised again by knocking out the champion in the third round with a right uppercut to the chin. He floored Larkin with a left hook for a count of one in the first minute of the first round. The bout was furious and both boxers landed constant blows, though Jack seemed to withstand the onslaught of Larkin and deliver an equal or greater number of counterpunches. Larkin was carried to his corner from a blow by Jack, 1:19 into the third, that rendered him unconscious for the ten count. It was only the third KO of Larkin's career. Both boxers were within a pound of 133.

=== Victories over Fritzie Zivic, February – March 1943 ===
Jack twice defeated Fritzie Zivic at Madison Square Garden on February 5, and March 5, 1943, in ten and twelve round unanimous decisions, though their second meeting was rather close. One source wrote Zivic was known for "dirty tactics", and that he fought like "a back ally brawler."

The crowd of more than 20,000 in the Garden on February 5, were displeased when Jack was called for a low blow in the eighth round, and the point's scoring became closer when Jack lost the round as a result of the foul. Nonetheless, the referee and judges gave the bout to Jack by at least a two-round margin.

=== Losing the NYSAC World Lightweight Championship to Bob Montgomery, May 1943 ===
Jack held the World Lightweight Title for only six months before dropping it to fellow hall-of-famer Bob Montgomery on May 21, 1943, before 18,343 in a fifteen-round unanimous points decision at the Garden. Jack won the first round by a wide margin with a flurry of uppercuts and his signature free-wheeling, constant punching from many angles. But Montgomery quickly settled down and scored frequently with a strong straight right that at times had Jack close to a knockout and against which he could find no adequate defense. Jack's eyes were virtually closed during much of the bout, but Montgomery's injuries were restricted to a cut above one eye. A right to the chin briefly knocked Jack to his knees in the eleventh round and he struggled in the remaining rounds. One ringside reporter gave Montgomery eleven rounds to only four for Jack.

=== Regaining the World Lightweight Championship from Montgomery, November 1943 ===
Jack would go on to regain the title from Montgomery on November 19, 1943, in a fifteen-round unanimous decision at New York's Madison Square Garden before a crowd of 17,866. Beau carefully followed the advice of his trainer Larry Amadee, who told him to stay close to Montgomery, fight fiercely when separated from clinches, and generally use his strength in infighting. He coasted on the advice of Amadee in several rounds. He stayed with Amadee's advice when Montgomery finished strong in the last five rounds. The Associated Press gave Jack seven rounds, six to Montgomery, and two even, though both judges gave Jack an impressive ten rounds.

In the ninth round, Jack scored one of his strongest blows after coming out of a clinch, and it helped him to take the offensive and win the ninth and tenth rounds. In the final five and particularly the last two rounds, Montgomery seemed strongest, nearly taking the bout in the opinion of some ringside. Jack was battered and required great conditioning and willpower to hold on through the final rounds.

Jack met Sammy Angott in a non-title match on January 28, 1944, drawing in ten rounds at Madison Square Garden before an impressive crowd of 19,113, the largest of the year. The match was an important contest between Jack, the New York State World Lightweight Champion, and Angott, the National Boxing Association World Lightweight Champion. Who led the battle see-sawed from boxer to boxer so frequently, it was a difficult contest to score. There were no knockdowns in the bout. The United Press gave each boxer four rounds with two even.

Angott had a problem from a thigh injury he had received in training and was limping as he was led from the ring at the end of the bout.

Jack finally lost the Lightweight Championship for the second time to Montgomery on March 3, 1944, in a fifteen-round split decision before 19,066 fans in Madison Square Garden. Jack had led in the early betting. The fighting was fierce and close throughout and Montgomery was given no more than a two-round advantage by the judges or referee, though the Associated Press scored the bout 8 for Montgomery, 4 for Jack, and three even. It would be Jack's last lightweight title match until meeting Ike Williams in July 1948.

On March 17, 1944, he defeated Al "Bummy" Davis, the "Brooklyn Bomber", at Madison Square Garden before a crowd of nearly 20,000, in a ten-round unanimous decision. The referees and judges gave him no less than nine of the rounds, with two scoring all ten rounds for Jack. Jack, who was a slight favorite in the betting, brought crowds to the Garden in 1943–44. The Georgia boot-black got out of his crouching style and slugged it out in close quarters with Davis in several rounds.

=== Win over NBA Lightweight Champion Juan Zurita, March 31, 1944 ===
On March 31, 1944, Jack defeated Mexican-born boxer Juan Zurita in a ten-round points decision at New York's Madison Square Garden. Zurita had taken the NBA Lightweight Title only three weeks earlier from Sammy Angott in Los Angeles. Zurita faded after the fifth round, and was given only three rounds to seven for Jack by the United Press. The Mexican champion looked strong in the tenth, and took the round. The capacity crowd of 17,593 were hoping for more action in the early rounds, but both boxers, knowing the skills of their opponent fought cautiously.

=== War bonds fight with Bob Montgomery, August 1944 ===
Some consider the most famous fight of Jack's career, a bout with Montgomery on August 4, 1944. Staged at a critical time in the second World War, it became known as the "War Bonds Fight", and tickets were only made available to purchasers of war bonds. A ringside seat required purchase of a $100,000 war bond.

Although Montgomery's title was not on the line, the gate was a record $36 million with 15,822 war bonds being sold. Many people who purchased bonds charitably left their tickets at the box office to be used by American servicemen. Montgomery and Jack, who were both serving as privates in the US Army, refused to take purses for the fight. Jack took the fight on points after 10 rounds, however the highlight of the evening was when the lights dimmed and a spotlight shone on Joe Louis was standing in the front row. Louis was received with a standing ovation.

Jack met Sammy Angott for the second time on July 8, 1946, at Griffith Stadium in Washington, D.C., where a crowd of 10,353 saw Jack win in a seventh-round technical knockout. Angott was very briefly down in round two, and Jack was down twice briefly in round four. The fighting was close but Jack rallied strongly in rounds five and six, and Angott did not answer the opening bell in round seven. The fighters boxed "as if the world championship was at stake". It was a "wild" and "reckless" fight and injuries suffered by Angott to his hip and back were briefly investigated at the request of the D.C. Boxing Commission after the fight. X-rays determined the aging thirty-one year old Angott had chipped a rib and suffered a torn ligament in his foot.

=== Last shot at the World Lightweight Title, Ike Williams, July 1948 ===
Jack would not challenge for the title again until July 12, 1948, when he fought future hall-of-famer and reigning champion Ike Williams in a sixth-round TKO at Shibe Park in Philadelphia. The fighting was fairly close in the first three rounds, as the referee gave one round to each fighter, and declared one even. The fourth was fought cautiously but by the fifth, Williams penetrated Beau's defenses and connected repeatedly. Williams brutally ended the bout with a left hook and flurry of subsequent blows in the sixth which led the referee to end the bout.

Williams was managed and on occasion financially exploited by boxing promoter Frank "Blinky" Palermo, who was Mafia-connected and a partner of Murder Inc. button-man Frankie Carbo. Carbo operated a stable of fighters which would later include heavyweight champion Sonny Liston. The first bout marked the start of a rivalry between Williams and Jack who would go on to fight on three more occasions. With Jack's skills clearly waning, Williams took the first match by a split decision, tied in the second match with a draw, and won the third when his opponent Jack was unable to answer the ninth round bell. Their third fight, on August 12, 1958, in Augusta, Georgia, though memorable, marked the end of Jack's career.

== Life after boxing ==
He retired with a record of 83 wins, with 40 knockouts, 24 losses and five draws. After retirement, he ran a drive-in barbecue stand and operated a small farm in Augusta, Georgia. He refereed wrestling matches in South Carolina during the period. With his boxing earnings, he moved to Miami and returned to shoe shining, working at Miami Beach's Fontainebleau Hotel. He trained fighters in Miami's 5th Street Gym.

== Family ==
Beau Jack had seven children, Ronald, Donald, George, Barbara Ann, Yvonne, Georgiana and Timothy. His wife was named Josephine. None of the sons became boxers.

== Last years and death ==
In his later years he suffered from poverty and Parkinson's disease. He died at 78, in a Miami nursing home, on February 9, 2000, of complications from Parkinson's disease.

== Honors ==
Jack was inducted into the Georgia Sports Hall of Fame in 1979 and the International Boxing Hall of Fame in 1991.

== Professional boxing record ==
121 fights	91 wins	24 losses
By knockout	44	4
By decision	47	20
Draws	5	
No contests	1	

No.	Result	Record	Opponent	Type	Round	Date	Location	Notes
121	Loss	91–24–5 (1)	Ike Williams	RTD	8 (10)	Aug 12, 1955	Bell Auditorium, Augusta, Georgia, U.S.	
120	Win	91–23–5 (1)	Willie Kid Johnson	SD	10	Jul 4, 1955	Beach Arena, Daytona Beach, Florida, U.S.	
119	Draw	90–23–5 (1)	Ike Williams	PTS	10	Apr 9, 1955	Bell Auditorium, Augusta, Georgia, U.S.	
118	Win	90–23–4 (1)	Eddie Green	UD	10	Jan 20, 1955	Columbia, South Carolina, U.S.	
117	Loss	89–23–4 (1)	Gil Turner	TKO	8 (10)	May 21, 1951	Arena, Philadelphia, Pennsylvania, U.S.	
116	Loss	89–22–4 (1)	Gil Turner	UD	10	Apr 16, 1951	Arena, Philadelphia, Pennsylvania, U.S.	
115	Win	89–21–4 (1)	Leroy Willis	UD	10	Mar 30, 1951	Coliseum Arena, New Orleans, Louisiana, U.S.	
114	Loss	88–21–4 (1)	Ike Williams	SD	10	Mar 5, 1951	Rhode Island Auditorium, Providence, Rhode Island, U.S.	
113	Win	88–20–4 (1)	Emil Barao	UD	10	Jan 31, 1951	Auditorium, Oakland, California, U.S.	
112	Loss	87–20–4 (1)	Del Flanagan	UD	10	Jan 18, 1951	Auditorium, Minneapolis, Minnesota, U.S.	
111	Loss	87–19–4 (1)	Fitzie Pruden	SD	10	Jan 1, 1951	Auditorium, Milwaukee, Wisconsin, U.S.	
110	Loss	87–18–4 (1)	Frankie Fernandez	UD	10	Nov 14, 1950	Honolulu Stadium, Honolulu, Hawaii	
109	Win	87–17–4 (1)	Philip Kim	MD	10	Oct 3, 1950	Honolulu Stadium, Honolulu, Hawaii	
108	Win	86–17–4 (1)	Bobby Timpson	TKO	6 (10)	Jul 17, 1950	City Auditorium, Atlanta, Georgia, U.S.	
107	Win	85–17–4 (1)	Ronnie Harper	TKO	5 (10)	Jun 28, 1950	Fairgrounds, Indianapolis, Indiana, U.S.	
106	Win	84–17–4 (1)	Johnny Potenti	UD	10	May 22, 1950	Boston Garden, Boston, Massachusetts, U.S.	
105	Win	83–17–4 (1)	Jackie Weber	RTD	6 (10)	May 8, 1950	Rhode Island Auditorium, Providence, Rhode Island, U.S.	
104	Win	82–17–4 (1)	Lew Jenkins	TKO	5 (10)	Apr 14, 1950	Uline Arena, Washington, D.C., U.S.	
103	Loss	81–17–4 (1)	Joey Carkido	PTS	10	Apr 3, 1950	Auditorium, Hartford, Connecticut, U.S.	
102	Loss	81–16–4 (1)	Tuzo Portuguez	SD	10	Dec 16, 1949	Madison Square Garden, New York City, New York, U.S.	
101	Loss	81–15–4 (1)	Kid Gavilán	UD	10	Oct 14, 1949	Chicago Stadium, Chicago, Illinois, U.S.	
100	Win	81–14–4 (1)	Livio Minelli	SD	10	Sep 30, 1949	Chicago Stadium, Chicago, Illinois, U.S.	
99	Win	80–14–4 (1)	Tote Martinez	UD	10	Sep 6, 1949	Olympic Auditorium, Los Angeles, California, U.S.	
98	Win	79–14–4 (1)	Johnny Gonsalves	SD	10	Aug 31, 1949	Auditorium, Oakland, California, U.S.	
97	Win	78–14–4 (1)	Eddie Giosa	UD	10	Jul 13, 1949	Griffith Stadium, Washington, D.C., U.S.	
96	Loss	77–14–4 (1)	Johnny Greco	UD	10	Mar 28, 1949	Forum, Montreal, Quebec, Canada	
95	Win	77–13–4 (1)	Jackie Weber	UD	10	Jan 17, 1949	Boston Garden, Boston, Massachusetts, U.S.	
94	Win	76–13–4 (1)	Leroy Willis	UD	10	Dec 17, 1948	Olympia Stadium, Detroit, Michigan, U.S.	
93	Win	75–13–4 (1)	Chuck Taylor	TKO	3 (10)	Nov 23, 1948	Convention Hall, Philadelphia, Pennsylvania, U.S.	
92	Win	74–13–4 (1)	Eric Boon	TKO	3 (10)	Oct 28, 1948	Uline Arena, Washington, D.C., U.S.	
91	Loss	73–13–4 (1)	Ike Williams	TKO	6 (15)	Jul 12, 1948	Shibe Park, Philadelphia, Pennsylvania, U.S.	For NYSAC, NBA, and The Ring lightweight titles
90	Win	73–12–4 (1)	Tony Janiro	UD	10	May 24, 1948	Griffith Stadium, Washington, D.C., U.S.	
89	Win	72–12–4 (1)	Johnny Greco	MD	10	Apr 9, 1948	Forum, Montreal, Quebec, Canada	
88	Loss	71–12–4 (1)	Terry Young	SD	10	Feb 20, 1948	Madison Square Garden, New York City, New York, U.S.	
87	Win	71–11–4 (1)	Johnny Bratton	TKO	8 (10)	Jan 23, 1948	Chicago Stadium, Chicago, Illinois, U.S.	
86	Win	70–11–4 (1)	Jimmy Collins	KO	2 (10)	Jan 5, 1948	Arena, New Haven, Connecticut, U.S.	
85	Win	69–11–4 (1)	Billy Kearns	UD	10	Dec 29, 1947	Rhode Island Auditorium, Providence, Rhode Island, U.S.	
84	Win	68–11–4 (1)	Frankie Vigeant	PTS	10	Dec 16, 1947	Auditorium, Hartford, Connecticut, U.S.	
83	Win	67–11–4 (1)	Humberto Zavala	KO	4 (10)	Nov 3, 1947	Kiel Auditorium, Saint Louis, Missouri, U.S.	
82	Loss	66–11–4 (1)	Tony Janiro	TKO	4 (10)	Feb 21, 1947	Madison Square Garden, New York City, New York, U.S.	
81	Loss	66–10–4 (1)	Buster Tyler	PTS	10	Oct 22, 1946	Armory, Elizabeth, New Jersey, U.S.	
80	Win	66–9–4 (1)	Danny Kapilow	UD	10	Aug 19, 1946	Griffith Stadium, Washington, D.C., U.S.	
79	Win	65–9–4 (1)	Sammy Angott	TKO	7 (10)	Jul 8, 1946	Griffith Stadium, Washington, D.C., U.S.	
78	Win	64–9–4 (1)	Johnny Greco	UD	10	May 31, 1946	Madison Square Garden, New York City, New York, U.S.	
77	Draw	63–9–4 (1)	Johnny Greco	PTS	10	Feb 8, 1946	Madison Square Garden, New York City, New York, U.S.	
76	Win	63–9–3 (1)	Morris Reif	KO	4 (10)	Jan 4, 1946	Madison Square Garden, New York City, New York, U.S.	
75	Win	62–9–3 (1)	Willie Joyce	UD	10	Dec 14, 1945	Madison Square Garden, New York City, New York, U.S.	
74	Win	61–9–3 (1)	Bob Montgomery	MD	10	Aug 4, 1944	Madison Square Garden, New York City, New York, U.S.	
73	Win	60–9–3 (1)	Juan Zurita	UD	10	Mar 31, 1944	Madison Square Garden, New York City, New York, U.S.	
72	Win	59–9–3 (1)	Al Davis	UD	10	Mar 17, 1944	Madison Square Garden, New York City, New York, U.S.	
71	Loss	58–9–3 (1)	Bob Montgomery	SD	15	Mar 3, 1944	Madison Square Garden, New York City, New York, U.S.	Lost NYSAC lightweight title
70	Win	58–8–3 (1)	Maxie Berger	UD	10	Feb 15, 1944	Public Hall, Cleveland, Ohio, U.S.	
69	Draw	57–8–3 (1)	Sammy Angott	PTS	10	Jan 28, 1944	Madison Square Garden, New York City, New York, U.S.	
68	Win	57–8–2 (1)	Lulu Costantino	SD	10	Jan 7, 1944	Madison Square Garden, New York City, New York, U.S.	
67	Win	56–8–2 (1)	Bob Montgomery	UD	15	Nov 19, 1943	Madison Square Garden, New York City, New York, U.S.	Won NYSAC lightweight title
66	Loss	55–8–2 (1)	Bobby Ruffin	UD	10	Oct 4, 1943	Madison Square Garden, New York City, New York, U.S.	
65	Win	55–7–2 (1)	Johnny Hutchinson	TKO	6 (10)	Jul 19, 1943	Shibe Park, Philadelphia, Pennsylvania, U.S.	
64	Win	54–7–2 (1)	Maxie Starr	TKO	6 (10)	Jun 21, 1943	Griffith Stadium, Washington, D.C., U.S.	
63	Loss	53–7–2 (1)	Bob Montgomery	UD	15	May 21, 1943	Madison Square Garden, New York City, New York, U.S.	Lost NYSAC lightweight title
62	Win	53–6–2 (1)	Henry Armstrong	UD	10	Apr 2, 1943	Madison Square Garden, New York City, New York, U.S.	
61	Win	52–6–2 (1)	Fritzie Zivic	UD	12	Mar 5, 1943	Madison Square Garden, New York City, New York, U.S.	
60	Win	51–6–2 (1)	Fritzie Zivic	UD	10	Feb 5, 1943	Madison Square Garden, New York City, New York, U.S.	
59	Win	50–6–2 (1)	Tippy Larkin	KO	3 (15)	Dec 18, 1942	Madison Square Garden, New York City, New York, U.S.	Won vacant NYSAC lightweight title
58	Win	49–6–2 (1)	Allie Stolz	TKO	7 (10)	Nov 13, 1942	Madison Square Garden, New York City, New York, U.S.	
57	Win	48–6–2 (1)	Terry Young	UD	10	Oct 12, 1942	St. Nicholas Arena, New York City, New York, U.S.	
56	Win	47–6–2 (1)	Chester Rico	PTS	8	Oct 2, 1942	Madison Square Garden, New York City, New York, U.S.	
55	Win	46–6–2 (1)	Joe De Jesus	KO	4 (10)	Sep 28, 1942	Turner's Arena, Washington, D.C., U.S.	
54	Win	45–6–2 (1)	Billy Murray	PTS	10	Aug 28, 1942	Madison Square Garden, New York City, New York, U.S.	
53	Win	44–6–2 (1)	Carmine Fatta	KO	1 (8)	Aug 18, 1942	MacArthur Stadium, Brooklyn, New York City, New York, U.S.	
52	Win	43–6–2 (1)	Ruby Garcia	TKO	6 (8)	Aug 1, 1942	Twin City Arena, Elizabeth, New Jersey, U.S.	
51	Win	42–6–2 (1)	Cosby Linson	TKO	8 (8)	Jul 7, 1942	Queensboro Arena, Long Island City, Queens, New York City, New York, U.S.	
50	Win	41–6–2 (1)	Bobby McIntire	TKO	6 (8)	Jul 3, 1942	Fort Hamilton Arena, Brooklyn, New York City, New York, U.S.	
49	Win	40–6–2 (1)	Guillermo Puentes	KO	1 (8)	Jun 23, 1942	MacArthur Stadium, Brooklyn, New York City, New York, U.S.	
48	Win	39–6–2 (1)	Bobby Ivy	PTS	8	May 22, 1942	Madison Square Garden, New York City, New York, U.S.	
47	Win	38–6–2 (1)	Carmelo Fenoy	UD	10	Jan 5, 1942	Valley Arena, Holyoke, Massachusetts, U.S.	
46	Loss	37–6–2 (1)	Freddie Archer	PTS	8	Dec 29, 1941	St. Nicholas Arena, New York City, New York, U.S.	
45	Loss	37–5–2 (1)	Freddie Archer	UD	8	Dec 8, 1941	St. Nicholas Arena, New York City, New York, U.S.	
44	Win	37–4–2 (1)	Sammy Rivers	TKO	3 (8)	Dec 1, 1941	Ridgewood Grove, Brooklyn, New York City, New York, U.S.	
43	Win	36–4–2 (1)	Guillermo Puentes	PTS	8	Oct 31, 1941	Madison Square Garden, New York City, New York, U.S.	
42	Win	35–4–2 (1)	Tommy Speigal	PTS	8	Oct 14, 1941	Broadway Arena, Brooklyn, New York City, New York, U.S.	
41	Win	34–4–2 (1)	Al Reid	KO	8 (8)	Sep 19, 1941	Madison Square Garden, New York City, New York, U.S.	
40	Win	33–4–2 (1)	Guillermo Puentes	PTS	6	Aug 26, 1941	Madison Square Garden, New York City, New York, U.S.	
39	Win	32–4–2 (1)	Al Roth	RTD	5 (6)	Aug 14, 1941	Ebbets Field, Brooklyn, New York City, New York, U.S.	
38	Win	31–4–2 (1)	Minnie DeMore	TKO	3 (6)	Aug 5, 1941	Ebbets Field, Brooklyn, New York City, New York, U.S.	
37	Win	30–4–2 (1)	George Zengaras	UD	8	Jun 16, 1941	Valley Arena, Holyoke, Massachusetts, U.S.	
36	Win	29–4–2 (1)	Tommy Speigal	PTS	8	Jun 2, 1941	Valley Arena, Holyoke, Massachusetts, U.S.	
35	Win	28–4–2 (1)	George Salamone	KO	8 (8)	May 19, 1941	Valley Arena, Holyoke, Massachusetts, U.S.	
34	Draw	27–4–2 (1)	Chester Rico	PTS	8	May 5, 1941	Valley Arena, Holyoke, Massachusetts, U.S.	
33	Win	27–4–1 (1)	Harry Gentile	TKO	1 (6)	Apr 28, 1941	Valley Arena, Holyoke, Massachusetts, U.S.	
32	Win	26–4–1 (1)	Bob Reilly	TKO	7 (8)	Apr 22, 1941	Foot Guard Hall, Hartford, Connecticut, U.S.	
31	Win	25–4–1 (1)	Tony Iacovacci	KO	6 (6)	Apr 7, 1941	Valley Arena, Holyoke, Massachusetts, U.S.	
30	Win	24–4–1 (1)	Joey Silva	UD	6	Mar 24, 1941	Valley Arena, Holyoke, Massachusetts, U.S.	
29	Win	23–4–1 (1)	Nicky Jerome	TKO	3 (6)	Mar 10, 1941	Valley Arena, Holyoke, Massachusetts, U.S.	
28	Win	22–4–1 (1)	Lenny Isrow	TKO	3 (6)	Feb 24, 1941	Valley Arena, Holyoke, Massachusetts, U.S.	
27	Win	21–4–1 (1)	Mexican Joe Rivers	TKO	4 (6)	Feb 10, 1941	Valley Arena, Holyoke, Massachusetts, U.S.	
26	Loss	20–4–1 (1)	Joey Silva	SD	6	Jan 27, 1941	Valley Arena, Holyoke, Massachusetts, U.S.	
25	Win	20–3–1 (1)	Mel Neary	TKO	5 (6)	Dec 30, 1940	Valley Arena, Holyoke, Massachusetts, U.S.	
24	Win	19–3–1 (1)	Young Johnny Buff	KO	1 (6)	Dec 16, 1940	Valley Arena, Holyoke, Massachusetts, U.S.	
23	Win	18–3–1 (1)	Jimmy Fox	PTS	6	Dec 2, 1940	Valley Arena, Holyoke, Massachusetts, U.S.	
22	Win	17–3–1 (1)	Joey Stack	UD	6	Nov 4, 1940	Valley Arena, Holyoke, Massachusetts, U.S.	
21	Win	16–3–1 (1)	Ritchie Jones	KO	3 (6)	Oct 21, 1940	Valley Arena, Holyoke, Massachusetts, U.S.	
20	Win	15–3–1 (1)	Abe Cohen	KO	3 (6)	Oct 14, 1940	Valley Arena, Holyoke, Massachusetts, U.S.	
19	Win	14–3–1 (1)	Tony Dupre	TKO	2 (6)	Sep 30, 1940	Valley Arena, Holyoke, Massachusetts, U.S.	
18	Win	13–3–1 (1)	Oliver Barbour	TKO	3 (6)	Sep 16, 1940	Valley Arena, Holyoke, Massachusetts, U.S.	
17	Win	12–3–1 (1)	Jackie Small	TKO	2 (4)	Sep 2, 1940	Valley Arena, Holyoke, Massachusetts, U.S.	
16	Win	11–3–1 (1)	Carlo Daponde	UD	4	Aug 26, 1940	Valley Arena, Holyoke, Massachusetts, U.S.	
15	Loss	10–3–1 (1)	Jackie Parker	UD	4	Aug 19, 1940	Valley Arena, Holyoke, Massachusetts, U.S.	
14	Win	10–2–1 (1)	Joe Polowitzer	PTS	6	Aug 12, 1940	White City Stadium, West Haven, Connecticut, U.S.	
13	Loss	9–2–1 (1)	Joe Polowitzer	PTS	6	Aug 2, 1940	White City Stadium, West Haven, Connecticut, U.S.	
12	Loss	9–1–1 (1)	Jackie Parker	SD	4	Jun 17, 1940	Valley Arena, Holyoke, Massachusetts, U.S.	
11	Win	9–0–1 (1)	Billy Bannick	TKO	3 (4)	May 27, 1940	Valley Arena, Holyoke, Massachusetts, U.S.	
10	Draw	8–0–1 (1)	Frankie Allen	PTS	4	May 20, 1940	Valley Arena, Holyoke, Massachusetts, U.S.	
9	Win	8–0 (1)	Joe James	KO	2 (6)	Mar 27, 1940	Municipal Auditorium, Aiken, South Carolina, U.S.	
8	Win	7–0 (1)	Silent Stafford	PTS	6	Mar 21, 1940	Municipal Auditorium, Aiken, South Carolina, U.S.	
7	ND	6–0 (1)	Vincent Corbett	ND	? (6)	Feb 29, 1940	Municipal Auditorium, Aiken, South Carolina, U.S.	Bout was scheduled for this day. Result unknown as of yet
6	Win	6–0	Alvin Stevens	KO	3 (6)	Feb 15, 1940	Municipal Auditorium, Aiken, South Carolina, U.S.	
5	Win	5–0	Battling Burns	PTS	4	Feb 8, 1940	Municipal Auditorium, Aiken, South Carolina, U.S.	
4	Win	4–0	Jack Moseley	PTS	4	Feb 1, 1940	Municipal Auditorium, Aiken, South Carolina, U.S.	
3	Win	3–0	Unknown	PTS	4	Jan 18, 1940	Municipal Auditorium, Aiken, South Carolina, U.S.	
2	Win	2–0	Battling Henry	KO	5 (6)	Apr 12, 1939	Reynolds Street Arena, Augusta, Georgia, U.S.	
1	Win	1–0	Unknown	TKO	? (6)	Apr 7, 1939	Richmond Arena, Augusta, Georgia, U.S.	

Achievements
Preceded by Sammy Angott vacated	NYSAC lightweight champion December 18, 1942 – May 21, 1943	Succeeded by Bob Montgomery
Preceded by Bob Montgomery	NYSAC lightweight champion November 19, 1943 – March 3, 1944	Succeeded by Bob Montgomery
