= Tippy Larkin =

American boxer

Personal information
- Nicknames: The Garfield Gunner; The Garfield Ghost
- Nationality: American
- Born: Antonio Pilliteri; November 11, 1917 Garfield, New Jersey
- Died: December 10, 1991 (aged 74) Clifton, New Jersey
- Height: 5 ft 7 in (1.70 m)
- Weight: Lightweight; Light-welterweight; Welterweight

Boxing career
- Stance: Orthodox

Boxing record
- Total fights: 151
- Wins: 134
- Win by KO: 57
- Losses: 15
- Draws: 1
- No contests: 1

Tippy Larkin (November 11, 1917 – December 10, 1991), born Antonio Pilliteri, was an American boxer from New Jersey who took the world light-welterweight boxing championship on April 29, 1946, in a twelve-round unanimous decision against Willie Joyce in Boston. From 1935 to 1946, Larkin's record was 114–9. He had Angelo Pucci as manager throughout his career, and during the nineteen bouts he had at Madison Square Garden.

== Early life and career ==
Larkin was born on December 11, 1917, to a family of Italian heritage, in Garfield, New Jersey. He took the name Tippy from the initials for his real name Antonio Pilliteri, or Tony Pilliteri. He got the name Larkin from his older brother Frank who had boxed as Bobby Larkin.

In 1934, at the age of seventeen, the young Larkin went off to work for a camp of the Civilian Conservation Corp (CCC) during the Great Depression, and soon helped to start inter-camp boxing matches with his co-workers. According to the legend he scored nine straight knockouts in these first amateur bouts.

Between March 1935 and October 1936, he won twenty-nine straight fights, many by knockout. His winning record throughout his early career was remarkable.

By December 19, 1938, Larkin was rated sixth in the World among American Lightweights, with Henry Armstrong as Champion and Lou Ambers rated first.

Demonstrating he was not invincible, on March 8, 1940, Texan Lew Jenkins knocked him out in the first round at Madison Square Garden. Jenkins was considered a knockout specialist. "Tearing out with the bell, the slugger from the Southwest (Jenkins) took command immediately. He threw both fists without a stop, finally connecting with a series of solid lefts and rights and Larkin dropped in his corner."

After an eight-month lay off to recover from an illness, Larkin stopped Joey Silva on March 13, 1941, in a fourth-round technical knockout in Jersey City, New Jersey. The bout was stopped at 1:49 into the fourth round by the referee because of a cut near Silva's eye.

In the spring of 1942, Larkin shot himself in the shoulder while cleaning his 22 rifle at home. He fought only once between February and May of that year, but was not badly injured and resumed his boxing career with considerable success by June.

In a ramp up to the NYSAC Lightweight Championship, on October 26, 1942, Larkin knocked out Abe Denner in 2:53 of the second round at Laurel Garden Arena in New Jersey. Denner had been down for a count of eight in the second round, before the knockout. Larkin weighed 137 for the bout, actually two pounds over the lightweight limit.

== World Light title attempt ==
On December 18, 1942, he fought Beau Jack for the New York State Athletic Commission's World Lightweight Title, losing in a third-round knockout at Madison Square Garden. The bout was the first in an elimination tournament for the Lightweight Championship staged by the NYAC, after Sammy Angott had vacated the title. Larkin was knocked out by a right from Jack near a neutral corner in one minute and nineteen seconds of the third round, but had gone down for a one count in the first round. The fighting was fierce with many punches connecting, and few pauses from the constant punching by both opponents. Both boxers weighed between 133–134, in the lightweight range. A large crowd of 18,817 were on hand to see the bout at the Garden.

== Loss to Henry Armstrong ==
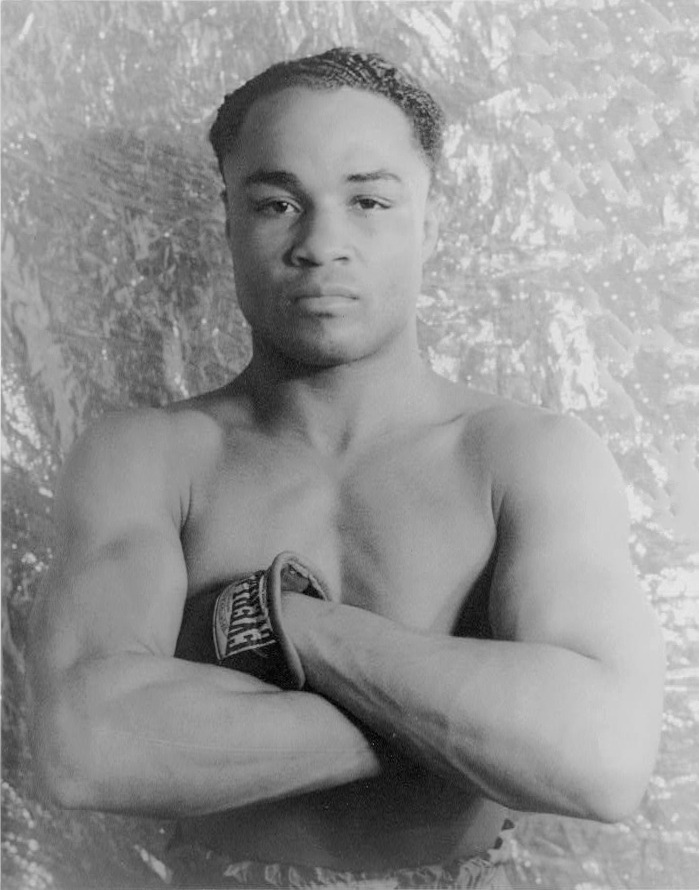
Henry Armstrong

On March 9, 1943, he lost to former triple World Champion Henry Armstrong in a second-round knockout before a crowd of 8,000 in Civic Auditorium in San Francisco. Armstrong was attempting a comeback and had formerly held the record for the most consecutive defenses of the World Welterweight Title. Though Armstrong was a strong draw in his native state, the Light Welterweight division was not. Armstrong knocked out Larkin in one minute and nine seconds of the second round. Both boxers were weighed in at the light welterweight range of around 140 pounds. Losing to Armstrong was no disgrace, as the great champion Barney Ross discovered in his career ending bout with Armstrong in May 1938.

== Important opponents, 1943–1944 ==
On November 15, 1943, Larkin gained a ten-round points decision over Rhode Island native Al Costa, in Providence, Rhode Island, giving "an almost perfect exhibition of boxing skill". Costa was considered a competent welterweight. Larkin was already boxing at 142 pounds, well into the welterweight range.

On December 10, 1943, Larkin knocked out "Doll" Rafferty halfway through the second round of a scheduled ten round bout at the Mechanic's Building in Boston. Larkin's weight was 136, near the top of the lightweight limit. Rafferty was down twice, once for a count of nine, before the blow which put him on the canvas for the count of ten.

On January 14, 1944, Larkin fought a rough ten-round draw against Bobby Ruffin at Madision Square Garden. A very substantial crowd of 15,323 watched the close bout at the Garden, and the bout gained a greater audience as it was one of the first widely televised boxing matches. Ruffin's manager, Maurie Waxman, was displeased with the Draw ruling.

=== Win over LuLu Constantino ===
On February 9, 1944, Larkin easily won a ten-round points decision against LuLu Constantino, considered an important opponent, at Madison Square Garden. A crowd of 11,535 watched the bout. Tippy boxed at just under 140 pounds, and took a penalty for not being able to make 137. Using his longer reach, he landed solidly, and rocked Constantino in the fourth, sixth, seventh, and eighth rounds.

=== Win over Allie Stoltz ===
On March 23, 1944, he defeated Allie Stolz, a well rated lightweight, at Madison Square Garden. Stoltz had the better of the bout in the first two rounds, then overconfident and taunting in the third, he took two hard rights to the chin spaced apart, going down for both before the referee stopped the bout. Larkin was slightly over the lightweight limit at 137 pounds, and into light welterweight territory. The bout was fought before 15,373 fans at the Garden, a sizable crowd. Larkin would have trouble staying within the lightweight and later junior welterweight limit in his career.

On June 2, 1944, Larkin achieved an eighth-round technical knockout over Freddie Archer at Madison Square Garden. He stopped Archer with a very strong straight right arm and the fight eventually ended when the referee stopped the fight one minute and twenty four seconds into the eighth round. Archer was briefly unconscious on the ropes after the blow, and was hospitalized overnight.

Larkin appeared on the cover of The Ring magazine in July 1944, gaining recognition as an up-and-coming boxer who was a candidate for the Lightweight championship.

== World Light Welter champ, 1945 ==
Larkin first met Joyce on August 3, 1945, in a ten-round unanimous decision at Madison Square Garden. The bout was described by one source as "one of the best fights of his career". In front of a crowd of over 13,000, Larkin defeated Joyce, though he was a slight underdog in the betting. Larkin had taken an entire year off from boxing prior to the bout to work in a war plant. Both boxers took some serious blows in the bout, with Larkin's left eye blackened.

On March 22, 1946, Larkin outpointed Nick Moran in ten rounds, at Madison Square Garden. Larkin weighed just over 140 for the bout, again fighting as a welterweight.

In their second meeting, Larkin took the World Light-Welterweight championship on April 29, 1946, in a twelve-round Unanimous Decision over Willie Joyce in Boston. Larkin was ruled to have won ten of the twelve rounds in what was considered a small crowd of under 8,000 for the championship fight at the Garden. Though Joyce had Larkin down three times for eight counts in the third round, Larkin came back for the remaining nine rounds and won the bout in the end.

== World Light Welter defenses ==
In a rematch with Joyce, Larkin successfully defended the Light-welterweight championship only once on September 13, 1946, in Madison Square Garden in a twelve-round Unanimous Decision. Sometime after the bout, most likely unable to consistently maintain the restrictive weight, Larkin vacated the Light Welterweight championship. The division was discontinued for several years after Larkin held it, until he was succeeded by Carlos Ortiz thirteen years later.

On February 14, 1947, Charlie Fusari knocked out Larkin in the ninth round at Madison Square Garden, putting him on the canvas a total of nine times in the rather one-sided fight. A crowd of 18, 494 packed the Garden to see the bout. Larkin was down on the mat in the first, second, seventh, and eight rounds. On October 21, 1948, Larkin would lose again to Fusari at the Armory in New Jersey, in a sixth-round technical knockout. Fusari was considered at one time a top contender for the World Welterweight Championship.

On March 21, 1947, Larkin defeated Billy Graham, a highly rated welterweight before a crowd of 14, 054 at Madison Square Garden. Larkin easily won a unanimous ten-round decision by the judges. In the first two rounds, Graham forced the fighting landing squarely in the first, and leaving a considerable gash on Larkin's nose in the second that later required stitches. From the third round on, Larkin effectively counterpunched Graham and gain a lead on points in every successive round. Graham only threatened in the seventh with a left hook to the chin that connected, but from which Larkin recovered. The judges gave Graham no more than two rounds in the bout.

On June 20, 1947, Larkin was knocked out by Ike Williams, NBA Lightweight Champion, in the fourth round of a non-title fight at Madison Square Garden. Larkin had been down once in the important bout for a count of nine in the fourth, before resuming the fight, and later being down and counted out later in the round.

Larkin's last fight would be loss by fourth-round technical knockout on December 29, 1952, against Steve Marcello, in Providence, Rhode Island. Larkin's manager immediately announced he would retire after the bout.

== Reckless driving in 1957 ==
On September 18, 1957, Larkin was arrested for drunken driving, and driving without a license or registration in New York.

On October 25, 1957, Larkin suffered a broken left leg and several broken ribs in a head on car accident which was later determined to have been his fault. Larkin was driving South in the Northbound lane. In early 1958 as a result of the October accident, he was sentenced to one to three years and jailed for causing death by reckless driving. His attorney claimed he was also a victim in the automobile crash that caused the unfortunate death of the New Jersey driver whose car he struck, but could not prevent Larkin's sentence.

== Death ==
Larkin retired from boxing in 1952.

He died on December 10, 1991, in Passaic, New Jersey, of kidney failure. He was buried on December 14 in Clifton, New Jersey.

Larkin was inducted into the World Boxing Hall of Fame in 1992.

== Professional boxing record ==
All information in this section is derived from BoxRec, unless otherwise stated.

=== Official record ===
151 fights	131 wins	13 losses
By knockout	57	10
By decision	74	3
Draws	1	
No contests	1	
Newspaper decisions/draws	5	

All newspaper decisions are officially regarded as “no decision” bouts and are not counted in the win/loss/draw column.

No.	Result	Record	Opponent	Type	Round	Date	Location	Notes
151	Loss	131–13–1 (6)	Steve Marcello	TKO	4 (10)	Dec 29, 1952	Rhode Island Auditorium, Providence, Rhode Island, U.S.	
150	Win	131–12–1 (6)	Maurice Jenkins	UD	8	Dec 11, 1952	Casino, Fall River, Massachusetts, U.S.	
149	Win	130–12–1 (6)	Maurice Jenkins	UD	10	Oct 23, 1952	Casino, Fall River, Massachusetts, U.S.	
148	Loss	129–12–1 (6)	Joey Lupo	RTD	1 (8)	Mar 6, 1952	Laurel Garden, Newark, New Jersey, U.S.	
147	Win	129–11–1 (6)	Alfredo La Grutta	UD	8	Nov 29, 1951	Broadway Arena, Brooklyn, New York City, New York, U.S.	
146	Win	128–11–1 (6)	Manouk Markarian	PTS	8	Nov 6, 1951	Laurel Garden, Newark, New Jersey, U.S.	
145	Win	127–11–1 (6)	Humberto Sierra	PTS	8	Oct 16, 1951	Laurel Garden, Newark, New Jersey, U.S.	
144	Loss	126–11–1 (6)	Bernard Docusen	RTD	5 (10)	Dec 7, 1949	Municipal Auditorium, New Orleans, Louisiana, U.S.	
143	Win	126–10–1 (6)	Aldo Minelli	PTS	10	Oct 24, 1949	Sports Arena, Toledo, Ohio, U.S.	
142	Win	125–10–1 (6)	Hy Meltzer	KO	2 (10)	Sep 26, 1949	Eastern Parkway Arena, Brooklyn, New York City, New York, U.S.	
141	Win	124–10–1 (6)	Al Evans	PTS	8	Aug 22, 1949	Meadowbrook Bowl, Newark, New Jersey, U.S.	
140	Win	123–10–1 (6)	Aldo Minelli	PTS	8	Jun 27, 1949	Meadowbrook Bowl, Newark, New Jersey, U.S.	
139	Win	122–10–1 (6)	Al Guido	PTS	10	Jun 13, 1949	Meadowbrook Bowl, Newark, New Jersey, U.S.	
138	Win	121–10–1 (6)	Giacomo Boderone	TKO	4 (8)	May 2, 1949	Arena, Trenton, New Jersey, U.S.	
137	Loss	120–10–1 (6)	Charley Fusari	TKO	6 (10)	Oct 21, 1948	Armory, Jersey City, New Jersey, U.S.	
136	Win	120–9–1 (6)	Ruby Kessler	PTS	8	Aug 31, 1948	Twin City Bowl, Elizabeth, New Jersey, U.S.	
135	Win	119–9–1 (6)	Willie Beltram	TKO	5 (10)	Aug 5, 1948	Madison Square Garden, Manhattan, New York City, New York, U.S.	
134	Win	118–9–1 (6)	Joe Lucignano	UD	10	Jul 26, 1948	Queensboro Arena, Long Island City, Queens, New York City, New York, U.S.	
133	Win	117–9–1 (6)	Ruby Kessler	UD	10	May 10, 1948	Eastern Parkway Arena, Brooklyn, New York City, New York, U.S.	
132	Win	116–9–1 (6)	Joe Lucignano	PTS	10	Apr 20, 1948	Jersey City Gardens, Jersey City, New Jersey, U.S.	
131	Win	115–9–1 (6)	Billy Kearns	UD	10	Apr 13, 1948	Salem Arena, Salem, Massachusetts, U.S.	
130	Win	114–9–1 (6)	Joe DiMartino	UD	10	Jan 26, 1948	Boston Garden, Boston, Massachusetts, U.S.	
129	Win	113–9–1 (6)	Pete Manchio	UD	10	Dec 29, 1947	Arena, Boston, Massachusetts, U.S.	
128	Win	112–9–1 (6)	Ernie Petrone	TKO	5 (10)	Dec 18, 1947	Mechanics Hall, Worcester, Massachusetts, U.S.	
127	Loss	111–9–1 (6)	Ike Williams	KO	4 (10)	Jun 20, 1947	Madison Square Garden, Manhattan, New York City, New York, U.S.	
126	Win	111–8–1 (6)	Lou Fortuna	TKO	6 (10)	Jun 4, 1947	Pierce Memorial Field, East Providence, Rhode Island, U.S.	
125	Win	110–8–1 (6)	Billy Graham	UD	10	Mar 21, 1947	Madison Square Garden, Manhattan, New York City, New York, U.S.	
124	Loss	109–8–1 (6)	Charley Fusari	TKO	9 (10)	Feb 14, 1947	Madison Square Garden, Manhattan, New York City, New York, U.S.	
123	Win	109–7–1 (6)	Tommy Mills	TKO	4 (10)	Nov 21, 1946	Armory, Akron, Ohio, U.S.	
122	NC	108–7–1 (6)	Johnny Jones	NC	1 (10)	Nov 5, 1946	Recreation Center, Manchester, New Hampshire, U.S.	
121	Win	108–7–1 (5)	Willie Joyce	UD	12	Sep 13, 1946	Madison Square Garden, Manhattan, New York City, New York, U.S.	Retained NYSAC and NBA light-welterweight titles
120	Win	107–7–1 (5)	Bobby McIntire	PTS	10	Aug 21, 1946	Arcadia Club, Providence, Rhode Island, U.S.	
119	Win	106–7–1 (5)	Bobby Claus	KO	5 (10)	Aug 1, 1946	Armory, Akron, Ohio, U.S.	
118	Win	105–7–1 (5)	Willie Joyce	UD	12	Apr 29, 1946	Boston Garden, Boston, Massachusetts, U.S.	Won vacant NYSAC and NBA light-welterweight titles
117	Win	104–7–1 (5)	Nick Moran	UD	10	Mar 22, 1946	Madison Square Garden, Manhattan, New York City, New York, U.S.	
116	Win	103–7–1 (5)	Bobby McIntire	UD	10	Mar 6, 1946	Armory, Akron, Ohio, U.S.	
115	Win	102–7–1 (5)	Solomon Stewart	KO	3 (10)	Feb 20, 1946	Armory, Akron, Ohio, U.S.	
114	Win	101–7–1 (5)	Nick Moran	UD	10	Nov 16, 1945	Madison Square Garden, Manhattan, New York City, New York, U.S.	
113	Win	100–7–1 (5)	Willie Joyce	UD	10	Aug 3, 1945	Madison Square Garden, Manhattan, New York City, New York, U.S.	
112	Win	99–7–1 (5)	Joey Gambaro	KO	2 (10)	Jul 17, 1944	Sargent Field, New Bedford, New Jersey, U.S.	
111	Win	98–7–1 (5)	Jackie Peters	KO	2 (10)	Jun 29, 1944	Carney Auditorium, Erie, Pennsylvania, U.S.	
110	Win	97–7–1 (5)	Freddie Archer	TKO	8 (10)	Jun 2, 1944	Madison Square Garden, Manhattan, New York City, New York, U.S.	
109	Win	96–7–1 (5)	Allie Stolz	TKO	3 (10)	Mar 23, 1944	Madison Square Garden, Manhattan, New York City, New York, U.S.	
108	Win	95–7–1 (5)	Lulu Costantino	UD	10	Feb 9, 1944	Madison Square Garden, Manhattan, New York City, New York, U.S.	
107	Draw	94–7–1 (5)	Bobby Ruffin	PTS	10	Jan 14, 1944	Madison Square Garden, Manhattan, New York City, New York, U.S.	
106	Win	94–7 (5)	Gene Ward	KO	4 (10)	Dec 20, 1943	Rhode Island Auditorium, Providence, Rhode Island, U.S.	
105	Win	93–7 (5)	Doll Rafferty	KO	2 (10)	Dec 10, 1943	Mechanics Building, Boston, Massachusetts, U.S.	
104	Win	92–7 (5)	Al Costa	UD	10	Nov 15, 1943	Rhode Island Auditorium, Providence, Rhode Island, U.S.	
103	Win	91–7 (5)	George Doty	RTD	4 (10)	Oct 29, 1943	Mechanics Building, Boston, Massachusetts, U.S.	
102	Win	90–7 (5)	Johnny Jones	PTS	8	Oct 16, 1943	Ridgewood Grove, Brooklyn, New York City, New York, U.S.	
101	Win	89–7 (5)	Patsy Spataro	PTS	10	Sep 15, 1943	Twin City Bowl, Elizabeth, New Jersey, U.S.	
100	Win	88–7 (5)	Harry Teaney	UD	10	Aug 20, 1943	Madison Square Garden, Manhattan, New York City, New York, U.S.	
99	Win	87–7 (5)	Ruby Garcia	PTS	8	Aug 17, 1943	MacArthur Stadium, Brooklyn, New York City, New York, U.S.	
98	Win	86–7 (5)	Johnny Jones	PTS	8	Jul 20, 1943	Twin City Bowl, Elizabeth, New Jersey, U.S.	
97	Win	85–7 (5)	Bobby McIntire	TKO	5 (8)	Jun 23, 1943	Twin City Bowl, Elizabeth, New Jersey, U.S.	
96	Win	84–7 (5)	Joe De Jesus	TKO	5 (10)	Jun 17, 1943	Mooers Field, Richmond, Virginia, U.S.	
95	Loss	83–7 (5)	Henry Armstrong	KO	2 (10)	Mar 8, 1943	Civic Auditorium, San Francisco, California, U.S.	
94	Loss	83–6 (5)	Beau Jack	KO	3 (15)	Dec 18, 1942	Madison Square Garden, Manhattan, New York City, New York, U.S.	For vacant NYSAC lightweight title
93	Win	83–5 (5)	Freddie Archer	PTS	10	Nov 16, 1942	Laurel Garden, Newark, New Jersey, U.S.	
92	Win	82–5 (5)	Abe Denner	KO	2 (10)	Oct 26, 1942	Laurel Garden, Newark, New Jersey, U.S.	
91	Win	81–5 (5)	Charley 'Dixie' Davis	RTD	7 (10)	Oct 19, 1942	St. Nicholas Arena, Manhattan, New York City, New York, U.S.	
90	Win	80–5 (5)	Charley 'Dixie' Davis	PTS	10	Oct 5, 1942	Laurel Garden, Newark, New Jersey, U.S.	
89	Win	79–5 (5)	Billy Davis	PTS	10	Jun 23, 1942	Meadowbrook Bowl, Newark, New Jersey, U.S.	
88	Win	78–5 (5)	Carmine Fatta	PTS	8	Jun 9, 1942	MacArthur Stadium, Brooklyn, New York City, New York, U.S.	
87	Win	77–5 (5)	Leo Rodak	PTS	10	Jun 3, 1942	Meadowbrook Bowl, Newark, New Jersey, U.S.	
86	Win	76–5 (5)	Jerry Moore	UD	10	Apr 13, 1942	Valley Arena, Holyoke, Massachusetts, U.S.	
85	Win	75–5 (5)	Chester Rico	PTS	8	Jan 30, 1942	Madison Square Garden, Manhattan, New York City, New York, U.S.	
84	Win	74–5 (5)	Tommy Cross	TKO	6 (8)	Jan 12, 1942	Laurel Garden, Newark, New Jersey, U.S.	
83	Win	73–5 (5)	Carmine Fatta	PTS	8	Dec 22, 1941	Laurel Garden, Newark, New Jersey, U.S.	
82	Win	72–5 (5)	Tommy Speigal	PTS	8	Dec 16, 1941	Grotto Auditorium, Jersey City, New Jersey, U.S.	
81	Win	71–5 (5)	Joey Zodda	KO	4 (8)	Sep 16, 1941	Belmont Park, Garfield, New Jersey, U.S.	
80	Win	70–5 (5)	George Zengaras	PTS	10	Aug 8, 1941	High School Field, Asbury Park, New Jersey, U.S.	
79	Win	69–5 (5)	Ray Bonti	TKO	1 (8)	Jul 18, 1941	Lodi Stadium, Lodi, New Jersey, U.S.	
78	Win	68–5 (5)	Freddie Archer	TKO	1 (10)	Jun 16, 1941	Meadowbrook Bowl, Newark, New Jersey, U.S.	
77	Win	67–5 (5)	Abe Cohen	KO	2 (8)	May 5, 1941	Perth Amboy, New Jersey, U.S.	
76	Win	66–5 (5)	Norman Rahn	TKO	3 (8)	Mar 24, 1941	Laurel Garden, Newark, New Jersey, U.S.	
75	Win	65–5 (5)	Joey Silva	TKO	4 (8)	Mar 13, 1941	Grotto Auditorium, Jersey City, New Jersey, U.S.	
74	Win	64–5 (5)	Maxie Fisher	PTS	10	Aug 12, 1940	Meadowbrook Bowl, Newark, New Jersey, U.S.	
73	Win	63–5 (5)	Johnny Rohrig	PTS	10	Jun 25, 1940	Belmont Park, Garfield, New Jersey, U.S.	
72	Win	62–5 (5)	Frankie Wallace	KO	4 (10)	Jun 3, 1940	Belmont Park, Garfield, New Jersey, U.S.	
71	Win	61–5 (5)	Jimmy Lancaster	TKO	3 (8)	May 7, 1940	Grotto Auditorium, Jersey City, New Jersey, U.S.	
70	Loss	60–5 (5)	Lew Jenkins	KO	1 (15)	Mar 8, 1940	Madison Square Garden, Manhattan, New York City, New York, U.S.	
69	Loss	60–4 (5)	Al 'Bummy' Davis	KO	5 (10)	Dec 15, 1939	Madison Square Garden, Manhattan, New York City, New York, U.S.	
68	Win	60–3 (5)	Joey Greb	PTS	8	Dec 7, 1939	Armory, Paterson, New Jersey, U.S.	
67	Win	59–3 (5)	Steve Halaiko	TKO	2 (8)	Nov 27, 1939	Kanter's Auditorium, Passaic, New Jersey, U.S.	
66	Loss	58–3 (5)	Jack 'Kid' Berg	PTS	10	Jun 6, 1939	Belmont Park, Garfield, New Jersey, U.S.	
65	Win	58–2 (5)	Billy Beauhuld	PTS	10	Apr 10, 1939	Laurel Garden, Newark, New Jersey, U.S.	
64	Win	57–2 (5)	George Zengaras	PTS	8	Feb 3, 1939	Madison Square Garden, Manhattan, New York City, New York, U.S.	
63	Win	56–2 (5)	Billy Beauhuld	TKO	10 (10)	Jan 6, 1939	Madison Square Garden, Manhattan, New York City, New York, U.S.	
62	Win	55–2 (5)	Jackie Savino	KO	3 (8)	Dec 26, 1938	Laurel Garden, Newark, New Jersey, U.S.	
61	Win	54–2 (5)	Charley Burns	PTS	8	Dec 19, 1938	Laurel Garden, Newark, New Jersey, U.S.	
60	Win	53–2 (5)	Freddie 'Red' Cochrane	PTS	15	Aug 29, 1938	Meadowbrook Bowl, Newark, New Jersey, U.S.	
59	Win	52–2 (5)	Frankie Wallace	PTS	10	Aug 15, 1938	Meadowbrook Bowl, Newark, New Jersey, U.S.	
58	Win	51–2 (5)	Eddie Zivic	KO	1 (10)	Aug 2, 1938	Meadowbrook Bowl, Newark, New Jersey, U.S.	
57	Win	50–2 (5)	Freddie 'Red' Cochrane	PTS	10	Jul 5, 1938	Meadowbrook Bowl, Newark, New Jersey, U.S.	
56	Win	49–2 (5)	Johnny Rohrig	PTS	10	Jun 8, 1938	Wessington Stadium, Clifton, New Jersey, U.S.	
55	Win	48–2 (5)	Julio Gonzales	PTS	8	May 23, 1938	Laurel Garden, Newark, New Jersey, U.S.	
54	Win	47–2 (5)	Tommy Grady	TKO	3 (8)	May 5, 1938	Armory, Passaic, New Jersey, U.S.	
53	Win	46–2 (5)	Pedro Nieves	TKO	5 (8)	Mar 24, 1938	Armory, Passaic, New Jersey, U.S.	
52	Win	45–2 (5)	Charley Badami	PTS	8	Mar 15, 1938	New York Coliseum, Bronx, New York City, New York, U.S.	
51	Win	44–2 (5)	Pete Mascia	TKO	2 (10)	Mar 10, 1938	Armory, Passaic, New Jersey, U.S.	
50	Win	43–2 (5)	Jackie Stewart	TKO	6 (8)	Feb 10, 1938	Armory, Passaic, New Jersey, U.S.	
49	Win	42–2 (5)	Mickey Duca	PTS	8	Jan 31, 1938	Laurel Garden, Newark, New Jersey, U.S.	
48	Win	41–2 (5)	Lew Massey	PTS	10	Dec 14, 1937	Laurel Garden, Newark, New Jersey, U.S.	
47	Win	40–2 (5)	Maxie Fisher	PTS	10	Nov 15, 1937	Laurel Garden, Newark, New Jersey, U.S.	
46	Win	39–2 (5)	Maxie Fisher	PTS	10	Oct 25, 1937	Laurel Garden, Newark, New Jersey, U.S.	
45	Win	38–2 (5)	Johnny Mason	KO	3 (10)	Sep 3, 1937	Ocean View A.A., Long Branch, New Jersey, U.S.	
44	Win	37–2 (5)	Maxie Fisher	PTS	10	Jul 13, 1937	Ollemar Field, Irvington, New Jersey, U.S.	
43	Win	36–2 (5)	Freddie 'Red' Cochrane	PTS	10	Jul 2, 1937	Ocean View A.A., Long Branch, New Jersey, U.S.	
42	Win	35–2 (5)	Jimmy Cogman	TKO	4 (8)	Jun 18, 1937	Ocean View A.A., Long Branch, New Jersey, U.S.	
41	Win	34–2 (5)	Freddie 'Red' Cochrane	PTS	10	May 24, 1937	Ollemar Field, Irvington, New Jersey, U.S.	
40	Win	33–2 (5)	Freddie 'Red' Cochrane	PTS	9	Mar 22, 1937	Laurel Garden, Newark, New Jersey, U.S.	
39	Win	32–2 (5)	Jimmy Cogman	PTS	8	Mar 15, 1937	Amusement Academy, Plainfield, New Jersey, U.S.	
38	Loss	31–2 (5)	Mickey Duca	PTS	8	Mar 1, 1937	Laurel Garden, Newark, New Jersey, U.S.	
37	Win	31–1 (5)	Tony Marengo	TKO	4 (8)	Feb 8, 1937	Laurel Garden, Newark, New Jersey, U.S.	
36	Win	30–1 (5)	Chang Collura	NWS	6	Jan 18, 1937	Laurel Garden, Newark, New Jersey, U.S.	
35	Win	30–1 (4)	Jimmy Cogman	PTS	8	Dec 29, 1936	Laurel Garden, Newark, New Jersey, U.S.	
34	Win	29–1 (4)	Meyer Alper	PTS	8	Dec 14, 1936	Laurel Garden, Newark, New Jersey, U.S.	
33	Win	28–1 (4)	George Carlo	PTS	8	Nov 6, 1936	Kanter's Auditorium, Passaic, New Jersey, U.S.	
32	Win	27–1 (4)	Chang Collura	PTS	6	Oct 30, 1936	Laurel Garden, Newark, New Jersey, U.S.	
31	Loss	26–1 (4)	Chang Collura	PTS	6	Oct 16, 1936	Laurel Garden, Newark, New Jersey, U.S.	
30	Win	26–0 (4)	Dick McClintick	KO	1 (6)	Sep 28, 1936	Laurel Garden, Newark, New Jersey, U.S.	
29	Win	25–0 (4)	Jimmy Quinn	PTS	6	Sep 23, 1936	Rutherford City Field, Rutherford, New Jersey, U.S.	
28	Win	24–0 (4)	Young Buckey	PTS	6	Sep 15, 1936	Elizabeth, New Jersey, U.S.	
27	Win	23–0 (4)	Walter Chapman	TKO	4 (6)	Sep 11, 1936	Boardwalk Arena, Long Branch, New Jersey, U.S.	
26	Win	22–0 (4)	Al Simmons	PTS	6	Aug 31, 1936	Meadowbrook Field, Newark, New Jersey, U.S.	
25	Win	21–0 (4)	Andre Sarilla	NWS	6	Aug 11, 1936	Braddock Bowl, Jersey City, New Jersey, U.S.	
24	Win	21–0 (3)	Jackie Corcoran	NWS	6	Jul 31, 1936	Ocean View A.A., Long Branch, New Jersey, U.S.	
23	Win	21–0 (2)	Sammy Miller	TKO	2 (6)	Jul 17, 1936	Boardwalk Arena, Long Branch, New Jersey, U.S.	
22	Win	20–0 (2)	Jimmy Donato	TKO	2 (6)	Jul 3, 1936	Boardwalk Arena, Long Branch, New Jersey, U.S.	
21	Win	19–0 (2)	Teddy Adams	KO	2 (6)	Jun 29, 1936	Meadowbrook Bowl, Newark, New Jersey, U.S.	
20	Win	18–0 (2)	Eddie Capana	KO	3 (6)	Jun 5, 1936	Boardwalk Arena, Long Branch, New Jersey, U.S.	
19	Loss	17–0 (2)	Johnny Scibelli	NWS	6	Jun 2, 1936	Braddock Bowl, Jersey City, New Jersey, U.S.	
18	Win	17–0 (1)	Tommy Mankin	TKO	1 (6)	May 11, 1936	Columbia Park, North Bergen, New Jersey, U.S.	
17	Win	16–0 (1)	Dominic Pasquale	KO	2 (6)	May 4, 1936	Laurel Garden, Newark, New Jersey, U.S.	
16	Win	15–0 (1)	Lew Fascio	PTS	6	Apr 13, 1936	Laurel Garden, Newark, New Jersey, U.S.	
15	Win	14–0 (1)	Pete Stewart	KO	2 (5)	Mar 9, 1936	Laurel Garden, Newark, New Jersey, U.S.	
14	Win	13–0 (1)	Phil Bufato	KO	1 (4)	Mar 3, 1936	Braddock Arena, Jersey City, New Jersey, U.S.	
13	Win	12–0 (1)	Eddie Capana	KO	2 (4)	Feb 24, 1936	Laurel Garden, Newark, New Jersey, U.S.	
12	Win	11–0 (1)	Joe Timpanaro	KO	3 (4)	Feb 10, 1936	Laurel Garden, Newark, New Jersey, U.S.	
11	Win	10–0 (1)	Eddie Capana	PTS	4	Jan 27, 1936	Laurel Garden, Newark, New Jersey, U.S.	
10	Win	9–0 (1)	Lew Fascio	PTS	4	Jan 6, 1936	Laurel Garden, Newark, New Jersey, U.S.	
9	Win	8–0 (1)	Eddie Capana	KO	2 (4)	Dec 23, 1935	Laurel Garden, Newark, New Jersey, U.S.	
8	Win	7–0 (1)	Nunzio Bisogno	TKO	1 (4)	Dec 16, 1935	Laurel Garden, Newark, New Jersey, U.S.	
7	Win	6–0 (1)	Al Gianetti	KO	1 (4)	Nov 7, 1935	Music Hall, Paterson, New Jersey, U.S.	
6	Win	5–0 (1)	Johnny Gaja	KO	3 (4)	Oct 24, 1935	Meadowbrook Bowl, Newark, New Jersey, U.S.	Exact date and location uncertain
5	Win	4–0 (1)	Tony Caprio	PTS	4	Sep 23, 1935	Laurel Garden, Newark, New Jersey, U.S.	Exact date and location uncertain
4	Win	3–0 (1)	Dominic Pasquale	PTS	4	Sep 16, 1935	Laurel Garden, Newark, New Jersey, U.S.	Exact date and location uncertain
3	Win	2–0 (1)	Pete Flash	TKO	3 (?)	Jul 7, 1935	Mueller's Grove, Passaic, New Jersey, U.S.	
2	Win	1–0 (1)	Johnny Fiore	KO	2 (3)	Mar 21, 1935	Music Hall, Paterson, New Jersey, U.S.	
1	Loss	0–0 (1)	Ed McGillick	NWS	3	Mar 14, 1935	Music Hall, Paterson, New Jersey, U.S.	

=== Unofficial record ===
151 fights	134 wins	15 losses
By knockout	57	10
By decision	77	5
Draws	1	
No contests	1	

Record with the inclusion of newspaper decisions in the win/loss/draw column.

No.	Result	Record	Opponent	Type	Round	Date	Location	Notes
151	Loss	134–15–1 (1)	Steve Marcello	TKO	4 (10)	Dec 29, 1952	Rhode Island Auditorium, Providence, Rhode Island, U.S.	
150	Win	134–14–1 (1)	Maurice Jenkins	UD	8	Dec 11, 1952	Casino, Fall River, Massachusetts, U.S.	
149	Win	133–14–1 (1)	Maurice Jenkins	UD	10	Oct 23, 1952	Casino, Fall River, Massachusetts, U.S.	
148	Loss	132–14–1 (1)	Joey Lupo	RTD	1 (8)	Mar 6, 1952	Laurel Garden, Newark, New Jersey, U.S.	
147	Win	132–13–1 (1)	Alfredo La Grutta	UD	8	Nov 29, 1951	Broadway Arena, Brooklyn, New York City, New York, U.S.	
146	Win	131–13–1 (1)	Manouk Markarian	PTS	8	Nov 6, 1951	Laurel Garden, Newark, New Jersey, U.S.	
145	Win	130–13–1 (1)	Humberto Sierra	PTS	8	Oct 16, 1951	Laurel Garden, Newark, New Jersey, U.S.	
144	Loss	129–13–1 (1)	Bernard Docusen	RTD	5 (10)	Dec 7, 1949	Municipal Auditorium, New Orleans, Louisiana, U.S.	
143	Win	129–12–1 (1)	Aldo Minelli	PTS	10	Oct 24, 1949	Sports Arena, Toledo, Ohio, U.S.	
142	Win	128–12–1 (1)	Hy Meltzer	KO	2 (10)	Sep 26, 1949	Eastern Parkway Arena, Brooklyn, New York City, New York, U.S.	
141	Win	127–12–1 (1)	Al Evans	PTS	8	Aug 22, 1949	Meadowbrook Bowl, Newark, New Jersey, U.S.	
140	Win	126–12–1 (1)	Aldo Minelli	PTS	8	Jun 27, 1949	Meadowbrook Bowl, Newark, New Jersey, U.S.	
139	Win	125–12–1 (1)	Al Guido	PTS	10	Jun 13, 1949	Meadowbrook Bowl, Newark, New Jersey, U.S.	
138	Win	124–12–1 (1)	Giacomo Boderone	TKO	4 (8)	May 2, 1949	Arena, Trenton, New Jersey, U.S.	
137	Loss	123–12–1 (1)	Charley Fusari	TKO	6 (10)	Oct 21, 1948	Armory, Jersey City, New Jersey, U.S.	
136	Win	123–11–1 (1)	Ruby Kessler	PTS	8	Aug 31, 1948	Twin City Bowl, Elizabeth, New Jersey, U.S.	
135	Win	122–11–1 (1)	Willie Beltram	TKO	5 (10)	Aug 5, 1948	Madison Square Garden, Manhattan, New York City, New York, U.S.	
134	Win	121–11–1 (1)	Joe Lucignano	UD	10	Jul 26, 1948	Queensboro Arena, Long Island City, Queens, New York City, New York, U.S.	
133	Win	120–11–1 (1)	Ruby Kessler	UD	10	May 10, 1948	Eastern Parkway Arena, Brooklyn, New York City, New York, U.S.	
132	Win	119–11–1 (1)	Joe Lucignano	PTS	10	Apr 20, 1948	Jersey City Gardens, Jersey City, New Jersey, U.S.	
131	Win	118–11–1 (1)	Billy Kearns	UD	10	Apr 13, 1948	Salem Arena, Salem, Massachusetts, U.S.	
130	Win	117–11–1 (1)	Joe DiMartino	UD	10	Jan 26, 1948	Boston Garden, Boston, Massachusetts, U.S.	
129	Win	116–11–1 (1)	Pete Manchio	UD	10	Dec 29, 1947	Arena, Boston, Massachusetts, U.S.	
128	Win	115–11–1 (1)	Ernie Petrone	TKO	5 (10)	Dec 18, 1947	Mechanics Hall, Worcester, Massachusetts, U.S.	
127	Loss	114–11–1 (1)	Ike Williams	KO	4 (10)	Jun 20, 1947	Madison Square Garden, Manhattan, New York City, New York, U.S.	
126	Win	114–10–1 (1)	Lou Fortuna	TKO	6 (10)	Jun 4, 1947	Pierce Memorial Field, East Providence, Rhode Island, U.S.	
125	Win	113–10–1 (1)	Billy Graham	UD	10	Mar 21, 1947	Madison Square Garden, Manhattan, New York City, New York, U.S.	
124	Loss	112–10–1 (1)	Charley Fusari	TKO	9 (10)	Feb 14, 1947	Madison Square Garden, Manhattan, New York City, New York, U.S.	
123	Win	112–9–1 (1)	Tommy Mills	TKO	4 (10)	Nov 21, 1946	Armory, Akron, Ohio, U.S.	
122	NC	111–9–1 (1)	Johnny Jones	NC	1 (10)	Nov 5, 1946	Recreation Center, Manchester, New Hampshire, U.S.	
121	Win	111–9–1	Willie Joyce	UD	12	Sep 13, 1946	Madison Square Garden, Manhattan, New York City, New York, U.S.	Retained NYSAC and NBA light-welterweight titles
120	Win	110–9–1	Bobby McIntire	PTS	10	Aug 21, 1946	Arcadia Club, Providence, Rhode Island, U.S.	
119	Win	109–9–1	Bobby Claus	KO	5 (10)	Aug 1, 1946	Armory, Akron, Ohio, U.S.	
118	Win	108–9–1	Willie Joyce	UD	12	Apr 29, 1946	Boston Garden, Boston, Massachusetts, U.S.	Won vacant NYSAC and NBA light-welterweight titles
117	Win	107–9–1	Nick Moran	UD	10	Mar 22, 1946	Madison Square Garden, Manhattan, New York City, New York, U.S.	
116	Win	106–9–1	Bobby McIntire	UD	10	Mar 6, 1946	Armory, Akron, Ohio, U.S.	
115	Win	105–9–1	Solomon Stewart	KO	3 (10)	Feb 20, 1946	Armory, Akron, Ohio, U.S.	
114	Win	104–9–1	Nick Moran	UD	10	Nov 16, 1945	Madison Square Garden, Manhattan, New York City, New York, U.S.	
113	Win	103–9–1	Willie Joyce	UD	10	Aug 3, 1945	Madison Square Garden, Manhattan, New York City, New York, U.S.	
112	Win	102–9–1	Joey Gambaro	KO	2 (10)	Jul 17, 1944	Sargent Field, New Bedford, New Jersey, U.S.	
111	Win	101–9–1	Jackie Peters	KO	2 (10)	Jun 29, 1944	Carney Auditorium, Erie, Pennsylvania, U.S.	
110	Win	100–9–1	Freddie Archer	TKO	8 (10)	Jun 2, 1944	Madison Square Garden, Manhattan, New York City, New York, U.S.	
109	Win	99–9–1	Allie Stolz	TKO	3 (10)	Mar 23, 1944	Madison Square Garden, Manhattan, New York City, New York, U.S.	
108	Win	98–9–1	Lulu Costantino	UD	10	Feb 9, 1944	Madison Square Garden, Manhattan, New York City, New York, U.S.	
107	Draw	97–9–1	Bobby Ruffin	PTS	10	Jan 14, 1944	Madison Square Garden, Manhattan, New York City, New York, U.S.	
106	Win	97–9	Gene Ward	KO	4 (10)	Dec 20, 1943	Rhode Island Auditorium, Providence, Rhode Island, U.S.	
105	Win	96–9	Doll Rafferty	KO	2 (10)	Dec 10, 1943	Mechanics Building, Boston, Massachusetts, U.S.	
104	Win	95–9	Al Costa	UD	10	Nov 15, 1943	Rhode Island Auditorium, Providence, Rhode Island, U.S.	
103	Win	94–9	George Doty	RTD	4 (10)	Oct 29, 1943	Mechanics Building, Boston, Massachusetts, U.S.	
102	Win	93–9	Johnny Jones	PTS	8	Oct 16, 1943	Ridgewood Grove, Brooklyn, New York City, New York, U.S.	
101	Win	92–9	Patsy Spataro	PTS	10	Sep 15, 1943	Twin City Bowl, Elizabeth, New Jersey, U.S.	
100	Win	91–9	Harry Teaney	UD	10	Aug 20, 1943	Madison Square Garden, Manhattan, New York City, New York, U.S.	
99	Win	90–9	Ruby Garcia	PTS	8	Aug 17, 1943	MacArthur Stadium, Brooklyn, New York City, New York, U.S.	
98	Win	89–9	Johnny Jones	PTS	8	Jul 20, 1943	Twin City Bowl, Elizabeth, New Jersey, U.S.	
97	Win	88–9	Bobby McIntire	TKO	5 (8)	Jun 23, 1943	Twin City Bowl, Elizabeth, New Jersey, U.S.	
96	Win	87–9	Joe De Jesus	TKO	5 (10)	Jun 17, 1943	Mooers Field, Richmond, Virginia, U.S.	
95	Loss	86–9	Henry Armstrong	KO	2 (10)	Mar 8, 1943	Civic Auditorium, San Francisco, California, U.S.	
94	Loss	86–8	Beau Jack	KO	3 (15)	Dec 18, 1942	Madison Square Garden, Manhattan, New York City, New York, U.S.	For vacant NYSAC lightweight title
93	Win	86–7	Freddie Archer	PTS	10	Nov 16, 1942	Laurel Garden, Newark, New Jersey, U.S.	
92	Win	85–7	Abe Denner	KO	2 (10)	Oct 26, 1942	Laurel Garden, Newark, New Jersey, U.S.	
91	Win	84–7	Charley 'Dixie' Davis	RTD	7 (10)	Oct 19, 1942	St. Nicholas Arena, Manhattan, New York City, New York, U.S.	
90	Win	83–7	Charley 'Dixie' Davis	PTS	10	Oct 5, 1942	Laurel Garden, Newark, New Jersey, U.S.	
89	Win	82–7	Billy Davis	PTS	10	Jun 23, 1942	Meadowbrook Bowl, Newark, New Jersey, U.S.	
88	Win	81–7	Carmine Fatta	PTS	8	Jun 9, 1942	MacArthur Stadium, Brooklyn, New York City, New York, U.S.	
87	Win	80–7	Leo Rodak	PTS	10	Jun 3, 1942	Meadowbrook Bowl, Newark, New Jersey, U.S.	
86	Win	79–7	Jerry Moore	UD	10	Apr 13, 1942	Valley Arena, Holyoke, Massachusetts, U.S.	
85	Win	78–7	Chester Rico	PTS	8	Jan 30, 1942	Madison Square Garden, Manhattan, New York City, New York, U.S.	
84	Win	77–7	Tommy Cross	TKO	6 (8)	Jan 12, 1942	Laurel Garden, Newark, New Jersey, U.S.	
83	Win	76–7	Carmine Fatta	PTS	8	Dec 22, 1941	Laurel Garden, Newark, New Jersey, U.S.	
82	Win	75–7	Tommy Speigal	PTS	8	Dec 16, 1941	Grotto Auditorium, Jersey City, New Jersey, U.S.	
81	Win	74–7	Joey Zodda	KO	4 (8)	Sep 16, 1941	Belmont Park, Garfield, New Jersey, U.S.	
80	Win	73–7	George Zengaras	PTS	10	Aug 8, 1941	High School Field, Asbury Park, New Jersey, U.S.	
79	Win	72–7	Ray Bonti	TKO	1 (8)	Jul 18, 1941	Lodi Stadium, Lodi, New Jersey, U.S.	
78	Win	71–7	Freddie Archer	TKO	1 (10)	Jun 16, 1941	Meadowbrook Bowl, Newark, New Jersey, U.S.	
77	Win	70–7	Abe Cohen	KO	2 (8)	May 5, 1941	Perth Amboy, New Jersey, U.S.	
76	Win	69–7	Norman Rahn	TKO	3 (8)	Mar 24, 1941	Laurel Garden, Newark, New Jersey, U.S.	
75	Win	68–7	Joey Silva	TKO	4 (8)	Mar 13, 1941	Grotto Auditorium, Jersey City, New Jersey, U.S.	
74	Win	67–7	Maxie Fisher	PTS	10	Aug 12, 1940	Meadowbrook Bowl, Newark, New Jersey, U.S.	
73	Win	66–7	Johnny Rohrig	PTS	10	Jun 25, 1940	Belmont Park, Garfield, New Jersey, U.S.	
72	Win	65–7	Frankie Wallace	KO	4 (10)	Jun 3, 1940	Belmont Park, Garfield, New Jersey, U.S.	
71	Win	64–7	Jimmy Lancaster	TKO	3 (8)	May 7, 1940	Grotto Auditorium, Jersey City, New Jersey, U.S.	
70	Loss	63–7	Lew Jenkins	KO	1 (15)	Mar 8, 1940	Madison Square Garden, Manhattan, New York City, New York, U.S.	
69	Loss	63–6	Al 'Bummy' Davis	KO	5 (10)	Dec 15, 1939	Madison Square Garden, Manhattan, New York City, New York, U.S.	
68	Win	63–5	Joey Greb	PTS	8	Dec 7, 1939	Armory, Paterson, New Jersey, U.S.	
67	Win	62–5	Steve Halaiko	TKO	2 (8)	Nov 27, 1939	Kanter's Auditorium, Passaic, New Jersey, U.S.	
66	Loss	61–5	Jack 'Kid' Berg	PTS	10	Jun 6, 1939	Belmont Park, Garfield, New Jersey, U.S.	
65	Win	61–4	Billy Beauhuld	PTS	10	Apr 10, 1939	Laurel Garden, Newark, New Jersey, U.S.	
64	Win	60–4	George Zengaras	PTS	8	Feb 3, 1939	Madison Square Garden, Manhattan, New York City, New York, U.S.	
63	Win	59–4	Billy Beauhuld	TKO	10 (10)	Jan 6, 1939	Madison Square Garden, Manhattan, New York City, New York, U.S.	
62	Win	58–4	Jackie Savino	KO	3 (8)	Dec 26, 1938	Laurel Garden, Newark, New Jersey, U.S.	
61	Win	57–4	Charley Burns	PTS	8	Dec 19, 1938	Laurel Garden, Newark, New Jersey, U.S.	
60	Win	56–4	Freddie 'Red' Cochrane	PTS	15	Aug 29, 1938	Meadowbrook Bowl, Newark, New Jersey, U.S.	
59	Win	55–4	Frankie Wallace	PTS	10	Aug 15, 1938	Meadowbrook Bowl, Newark, New Jersey, U.S.	
58	Win	54–4	Eddie Zivic	KO	1 (10)	Aug 2, 1938	Meadowbrook Bowl, Newark, New Jersey, U.S.	
57	Win	53–4	Freddie 'Red' Cochrane	PTS	10	Jul 5, 1938	Meadowbrook Bowl, Newark, New Jersey, U.S.	
56	Win	52–4	Johnny Rohrig	PTS	10	Jun 8, 1938	Wessington Stadium, Clifton, New Jersey, U.S.	
55	Win	51–4	Julio Gonzales	PTS	8	May 23, 1938	Laurel Garden, Newark, New Jersey, U.S.	
54	Win	50–4	Tommy Grady	TKO	3 (8)	May 5, 1938	Armory, Passaic, New Jersey, U.S.	
53	Win	49–4	Pedro Nieves	TKO	5 (8)	Mar 24, 1938	Armory, Passaic, New Jersey, U.S.	
52	Win	48–4	Charley Badami	PTS	8	Mar 15, 1938	New York Coliseum, Bronx, New York City, New York, U.S.	
51	Win	47–4	Pete Mascia	TKO	2 (10)	Mar 10, 1938	Armory, Passaic, New Jersey, U.S.	
50	Win	46–4	Jackie Stewart	TKO	6 (8)	Feb 10, 1938	Armory, Passaic, New Jersey, U.S.	
49	Win	45–4	Mickey Duca	PTS	8	Jan 31, 1938	Laurel Garden, Newark, New Jersey, U.S.	
48	Win	44–4	Lew Massey	PTS	10	Dec 14, 1937	Laurel Garden, Newark, New Jersey, U.S.	
47	Win	43–4	Maxie Fisher	PTS	10	Nov 15, 1937	Laurel Garden, Newark, New Jersey, U.S.	
46	Win	42–4	Maxie Fisher	PTS	10	Oct 25, 1937	Laurel Garden, Newark, New Jersey, U.S.	
45	Win	41–4	Johnny Mason	KO	3 (10)	Sep 3, 1937	Ocean View A.A., Long Branch, New Jersey, U.S.	
44	Win	40–4	Maxie Fisher	PTS	10	Jul 13, 1937	Ollemar Field, Irvington, New Jersey, U.S.	
43	Win	39–4	Freddie 'Red' Cochrane	PTS	10	Jul 2, 1937	Ocean View A.A., Long Branch, New Jersey, U.S.	
42	Win	38–4	Jimmy Cogman	TKO	4 (8)	Jun 18, 1937	Ocean View A.A., Long Branch, New Jersey, U.S.	
41	Win	37–4	Freddie 'Red' Cochrane	PTS	10	May 24, 1937	Ollemar Field, Irvington, New Jersey, U.S.	
40	Win	36–4	Freddie 'Red' Cochrane	PTS	9	Mar 22, 1937	Laurel Garden, Newark, New Jersey, U.S.	
39	Win	35–4	Jimmy Cogman	PTS	8	Mar 15, 1937	Amusement Academy, Plainfield, New Jersey, U.S.	
38	Loss	34–4	Mickey Duca	PTS	8	Mar 1, 1937	Laurel Garden, Newark, New Jersey, U.S.	
37	Win	34–3	Tony Marengo	TKO	4 (8)	Feb 8, 1937	Laurel Garden, Newark, New Jersey, U.S.	
36	Win	33–3	Chang Collura	NWS	6	Jan 18, 1937	Laurel Garden, Newark, New Jersey, U.S.	
35	Win	32–3	Jimmy Cogman	PTS	8	Dec 29, 1936	Laurel Garden, Newark, New Jersey, U.S.	
34	Win	31–3	Meyer Alper	PTS	8	Dec 14, 1936	Laurel Garden, Newark, New Jersey, U.S.	
33	Win	30–3	George Carlo	PTS	8	Nov 6, 1936	Kanter's Auditorium, Passaic, New Jersey, U.S.	
32	Win	29–3	Chang Collura	PTS	6	Oct 30, 1936	Laurel Garden, Newark, New Jersey, U.S.	
31	Loss	28–3	Chang Collura	PTS	6	Oct 16, 1936	Laurel Garden, Newark, New Jersey, U.S.	
30	Win	28–2	Dick McClintick	KO	1 (6)	Sep 28, 1936	Laurel Garden, Newark, New Jersey, U.S.	
29	Win	27–2	Jimmy Quinn	PTS	6	Sep 23, 1936	Rutherford City Field, Rutherford, New Jersey, U.S.	
28	Win	26–2	Young Buckey	PTS	6	Sep 15, 1936	Elizabeth, New Jersey, U.S.	
27	Win	25–2	Walter Chapman	TKO	4 (6)	Sep 11, 1936	Boardwalk Arena, Long Branch, New Jersey, U.S.	
26	Win	24–2	Al Simmons	PTS	6	Aug 31, 1936	Meadowbrook Field, Newark, New Jersey, U.S.	
25	Win	23–2	Andre Sarilla	NWS	6	Aug 11, 1936	Braddock Bowl, Jersey City, New Jersey, U.S.	
24	Win	22–2	Jackie Corcoran	NWS	6	Jul 31, 1936	Ocean View A.A., Long Branch, New Jersey, U.S.	
23	Win	21–2	Sammy Miller	TKO	2 (6)	Jul 17, 1936	Boardwalk Arena, Long Branch, New Jersey, U.S.	
22	Win	20–2	Jimmy Donato	TKO	2 (6)	Jul 3, 1936	Boardwalk Arena, Long Branch, New Jersey, U.S.	
21	Win	19–2	Teddy Adams	KO	2 (6)	Jun 29, 1936	Meadowbrook Bowl, Newark, New Jersey, U.S.	
20	Win	18–2	Eddie Capana	KO	3 (6)	Jun 5, 1936	Boardwalk Arena, Long Branch, New Jersey, U.S.	
19	Loss	17–2	Johnny Scibelli	NWS	6	Jun 2, 1936	Braddock Bowl, Jersey City, New Jersey, U.S.	
18	Win	17–1	Tommy Mankin	TKO	1 (6)	May 11, 1936	Columbia Park, North Bergen, New Jersey, U.S.	
17	Win	16–1	Dominic Pasquale	KO	2 (6)	May 4, 1936	Laurel Garden, Newark, New Jersey, U.S.	
16	Win	15–1	Lew Fascio	PTS	6	Apr 13, 1936	Laurel Garden, Newark, New Jersey, U.S.	
15	Win	14–1	Pete Stewart	KO	2 (5)	Mar 9, 1936	Laurel Garden, Newark, New Jersey, U.S.	
14	Win	13–1	Phil Bufato	KO	1 (4)	Mar 3, 1936	Braddock Arena, Jersey City, New Jersey, U.S.	
13	Win	12–1	Eddie Capana	KO	2 (4)	Feb 24, 1936	Laurel Garden, Newark, New Jersey, U.S.	
12	Win	11–1	Joe Timpanaro	KO	3 (4)	Feb 10, 1936	Laurel Garden, Newark, New Jersey, U.S.	
11	Win	10–1	Eddie Capana	PTS	4	Jan 27, 1936	Laurel Garden, Newark, New Jersey, U.S.	
10	Win	9–1	Lew Fascio	PTS	4	Jan 6, 1936	Laurel Garden, Newark, New Jersey, U.S.	
9	Win	8–1	Eddie Capana	KO	2 (4)	Dec 23, 1935	Laurel Garden, Newark, New Jersey, U.S.	
8	Win	7–1	Nunzio Bisogno	TKO	1 (4)	Dec 16, 1935	Laurel Garden, Newark, New Jersey, U.S.	
7	Win	6–1	Al Gianetti	KO	1 (4)	Nov 7, 1935	Music Hall, Paterson, New Jersey, U.S.	
6	Win	5–1	Johnny Gaja	KO	3 (4)	Oct 24, 1935	Meadowbrook Bowl, Newark, New Jersey, U.S.	Exact date and location uncertain
5	Win	4–1	Tony Caprio	PTS	4	Sep 23, 1935	Laurel Garden, Newark, New Jersey, U.S.	Exact date and location uncertain
4	Win	3–1	Dominic Pasquale	PTS	4	Sep 16, 1935	Laurel Garden, Newark, New Jersey, U.S.	Exact date and location uncertain
3	Win	2–1	Pete Flash	TKO	3 (?)	Jul 7, 1935	Mueller's Grove, Passaic, New Jersey, U.S.	
2	Win	1–1	Johnny Fiore	KO	2 (3)	Mar 21, 1935	Music Hall, Paterson, New Jersey, U.S.	
1	Loss	0–1	Ed McGillick	NWS	3	Mar 14, 1935	Music Hall, Paterson, New Jersey, U.S.	

== See also ==
- List of light welterweight boxing champions

Achievements
Preceded by Barney Ross	World Light-welterweight Champion; April 29, 1946 – November 5, 1946 Vacated	Succeeded by Carlos Ortiz
