= Lew Jenkins =

American boxer

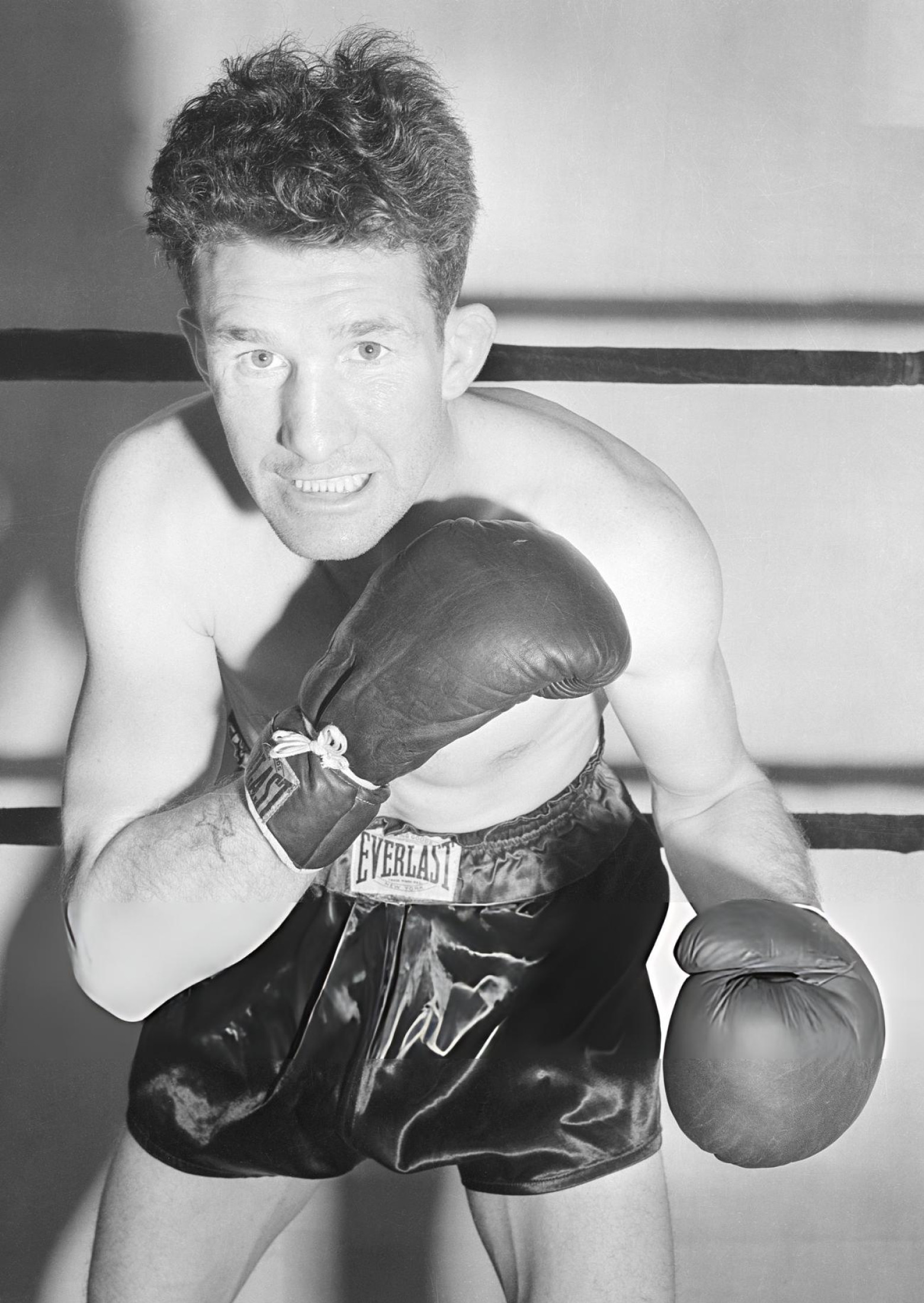
- Jenkins in 1940

Personal information
- Nickname: The Sweetwater Swatter The Sweet Swatter from Sweetwater The Living Death
- Born: Verlin E. Jenkins; December 4, 1916 Milburn, Texas, US
- Died: October 30, 1981 (aged 64) Oakland, California, US
- Weight: Lightweight

Boxing career
- Stance: Orthodox

Boxing record
- Total fights: 120
- Wins: 74
- Win by KO: 52
- Losses: 41
- Draws: 5

Lew Jenkins (December 4, 1916 – October 30, 1981) was an American boxer and NYSAC and The Ring lightweight champion from 1940 to 1941. He was born in Milburn, Texas and was raised during the Great Depression. He began fighting in carnivals and later continued his boxing in the US Coast Guard. He was an exceptionally powerful puncher and 51 of his 73 wins were by knockout. His managers included Benny Woodhall, Frank Bachman, Hymie Kaplan, and Willie Ketchum and his trainer was Charley Rose.

His punching power was legendary, and so was his drinking, carousing, and penchant for high-speed motorcycles. "The two toughest opponents I had were Jack Daniels and Harley Davidson," Lew Jenkins stated.

Jenkins took the World Lightweight Championship on May 10, 1940, in a third-round TKO against Lou Ambers at New York's Madison Square Garden.

Jenkins was admitted to the Ring Boxing Hall of Fame in 1977, the World Boxing Hall of Fame in 1983 and in 1999, the International Boxing Hall of Fame.

== Early life ==
Verlin E. Jenkins was born on December 4, 1916, in Milburn, Texas, to Artie James and Minnie Lee, formerly Minnie Lee White. He was the third of four children and had two older and one younger sisters. He started professional boxing around 1935 in Texas, New Mexico, and Arizona, but by 1938 was boxing regularly in Dallas. The biggest fights of his early career took place after he moved to New York in 1939.

== Professional career highlights ==
Jenkins defeated Lew Feldman on April 8, 1938, in a ten-round split decision at the Sportatorium in Dallas, Texas. Oddly, the Dallas crowd booed loudly after the decision of the judges and referees for Jenkins, the Texas native.

=== Win over Mike Belloise, November 1939 ===
On November 21, 1939, Jenkins scored a seventh-round technical knockout against Mike Belloise, a former World Featherweight Champion, before a crowd of 12,000 at the Bronx's New York Coliseum. Belloise was unable to answer the call of the bell for the eighth round due to the severe punishment he had taken to the body in the sixth and seventh rounds. It was later confirmed that Belloise suffered a broken rib from the bout.

On January 24, 1940, Jenkins convincingly defeated Cuban boxer Chino Alvarez in a knockout only around fifteen seconds into the first round at the Sportatorium in Dallas. Jenkins landed only two or three punches and the rowdy Dallas crowd booed when the ten count was completed, with several climbing into the ring. The victory was Jenkin's ninth straight with six by knockouts. Jenkins sudden rise to prominence as a serious World Lightweight contender was not unprecedented, as he had been fighting professionally at least five years, but the quality of his opposition had increased dramatically in the last two years as many newspapers noted. When he defeated Tippy Larkin in a first-round knockout at Madison Square Garden on March 8, 1940, he was finally scheduled for a World Lightweight Title bout with reigning champion Lou Ambers. In the impressive win over Larkin, Jenkins started cautiously, then flicked a few straight lefts. After Jenkins blasted with both hands, and in "2:41 of the first round Larkin was left flailing around in his own corner and down for the count."

=== Taking the World Lightweight Championship, May 1940 ===
Jenkins defeated Lou Ambers in New York City on May 10, 1940, to become World Lightweight Champion. Ambers was down for a count of five in the first, briefly down again from a left in the second, and was down in the third before the referee stopped the bout when Jenkins landed a final solid right to Ambers' jaw.

After winning the World Lightweight Championship from Ambers, Jenkins lost his boxing discipline and spent time carousing at night and buying expensive automobiles. He drank recklessly, sometimes before bouts, and crashed several motorcycles and cars.

On March 8, 1940, Jenkins scored a first-round knockout of Tippy Larkin in a non-title bout at New York's Madison Square Garden before a crowd of 11,542. "Tearing out with the bell, the slugger from the Southwest (Jenkins) took command immediately. He threw both fists without a stop, finally connecting with a series of solid lefts and rights and Larkin dropped in his corner." The knockout occurred at the end of the first, 2:41 into the round. Jenkins had scored five straight knockouts in his most recent New York fights. A noteworthy opponent, Larkin would take the World Light Welterweight Championship in 1946.

On September 16, 1940, Jenkins managed to win a decision against Bob Montgomery in a non-title, ten-round decision, before a crowd of 12,900 at Shibe Park in Philadelphia. Jenkins was down in the third round for a count of nine. The United Press gave Jenkins five rounds to four for Montgomery, though ring officials gave Jenkins a somewhat wider margin. Montgomery would twice hold the NYSAC World Lightweight Championship in May 1943 and November 1944.

==== World Lightweight Championship defense, November 1940 ====
On November 22, 1940, Jenkins successfully defended his World Lightweight Title against Pete Lello in a second-round knockout at New York's Madison Square Garden before a largely hostile audience of around 11,000. Jenkins knocked Lello down four times in the second, usually with strong blows to the jaw and at least twice for counts of nine. He said after the bout that he had little memory of the bout after his first knockdown in the second. Lello had formerly knocked out Jenkins in a close bout that ended in an early seventh round victory in Chicago on March 24, 1939.

=== Losing the World Lightweight Championship, December 1941 ===
On December 19, 1941, Jenkins lost his World Lightweight Title against Sammy Angott before a crowd of 11,343 at New York's Madison Square Garden. Fighting with a neck injury he may have received from motorcycle and car crashes, he was outpointed over 15 rounds. From then on he lost a significant percentage of his remaining bouts, though often against quality competition.

On September 30, 1949, Jenkins defeated Eddie Giosa in a ten-round unanimous decision at the Arena in Philadelphia. He had Giosa down for a count of eight in the second from a left hook, then put him to the mat again with a right to the head. He had Giosa down again in the tenth with a left hook to the head for a count of eight, though the fight continued and was determined by a points decision. Both men fought at 139 in the welterweight range. He had formerly lost to Giosa on May 2, 1949, in a fairly close split decision at the same location. The May victory was Giosa's fourth straight win.

== Military career ==
Jenkins served in the Coast Guard in World War II, where he participated in troop deployment, and found himself in the thick of battle during the Allied invasions of North Africa and the D-Day invasion of Normandy, France. He re-enlisted in the infantry at the outbreak of America's involvement in the Korean War around 1950 and was awarded the Silver Star for saving several men from enemy fire.

== Boxing comeback ==
He attempted a comeback after World War II, but was unable to regain his status as a top lightweight and welterweight. He retired from boxing in 1950. In 2003, Jenkins made the Ring Magazine's list of the 100 greatest punchers of all time.

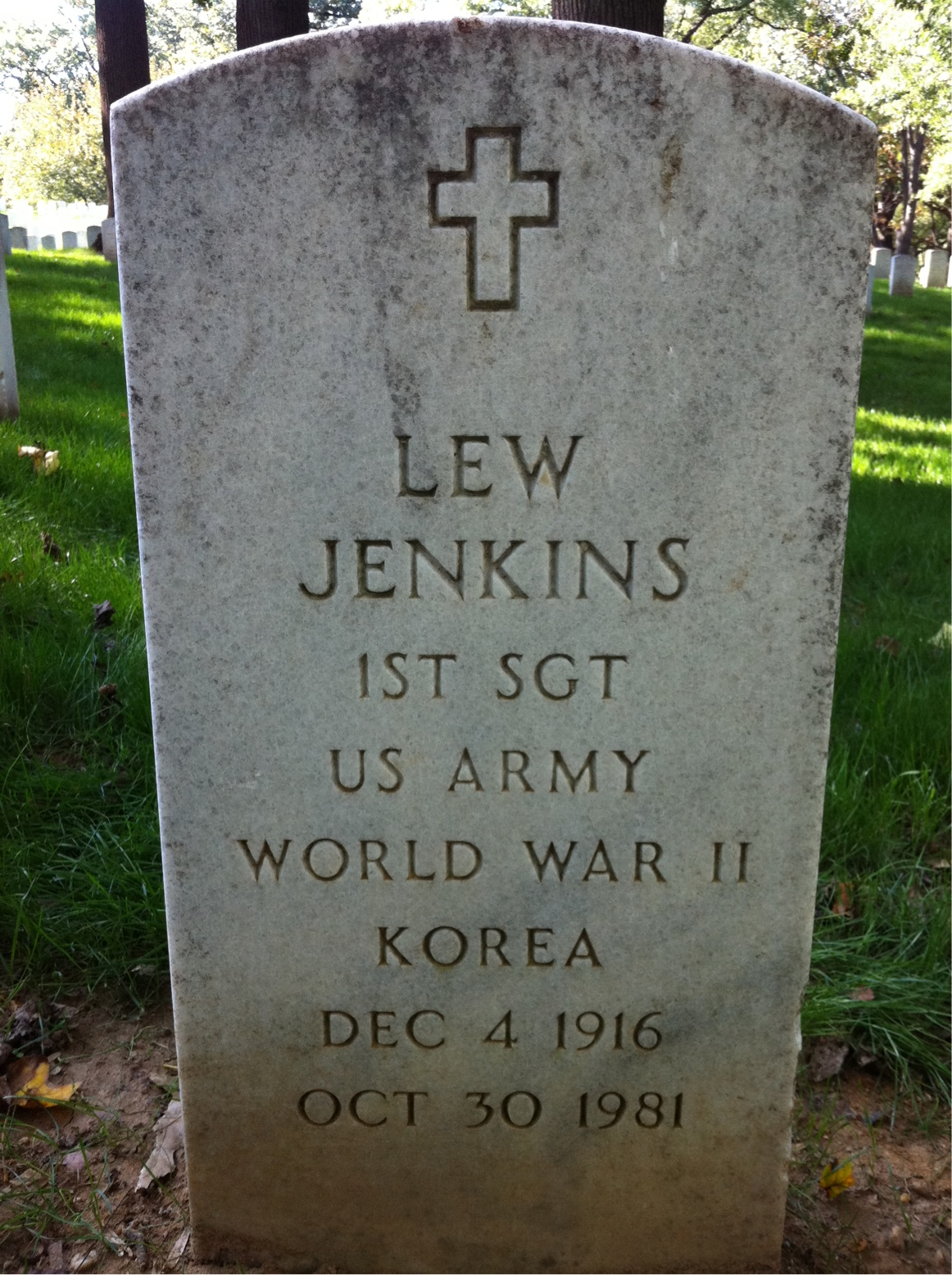
Lew Jenkins's headstone at Arlington National Cemetery, Virginia.

Jenkins died October 30, 1981, at the Oakland Naval Regional Medical Center after a long illness. He is buried in Arlington National Cemetery.

== Professional boxing record ==
120 fights	74 wins	41 losses
By knockout	52	12
By decision	21	29
By disqualification	1	0
Draws	5	

No.	Result	Record	Opponent	Type	Round	Date	Location	Notes
120	Loss	74–41–5	Beau Jack	TKO	5 (10)	Apr 14, 1950	Uline Arena, Washington, D.C., U.S.	
119	Loss	74–40–5	Carmen Basilio	MD	10	Mar 6, 1950	State Fair Coliseum, Syracuse, New York, U.S.	
118	Loss	74–39–5	Rafael Lastre	TKO	10 (10)	Jan 31, 1950	Sports Arena, Toledo, Ohio, U.S.	
117	Loss	74–38–5	Walter Haines	UD	8	Jan 25, 1950	St. Nicholas Arena, New York City, New York, U.S.	
116	Win	74–37–5	Al Pennino	KO	3 (8)	Jan 9, 1950	Laurel Garden, Newark, New Jersey, U.S.	
115	Win	73–37–5	Iggy Vaccari	TKO	9 (10)	Dec 19, 1949	Mechanics Building, Boston, Massachusetts, U.S.	
114	Win	72–37–5	Johnny DeFazio	KO	8 (8)	Dec 5, 1949	Laurel Garden, Newark, New Jersey, U.S.	
113	Loss	71–37–5	Calvin Smith	PTS	10	Nov 14, 1949	Arena, Philadelphia, Pennsylvania, U.S.	
112	Win	71–36–5	Issac Jenkins	UD	8	Oct 20, 1949	Metropolitan Opera House, Philadelphia, Pennsylvania, U.S.	
111	Win	70–36–5	Eddie Giosa	UD	10	Sep 30, 1949	Arena, Philadelphia, Pennsylvania, U.S.	
110	Loss	69–36–5	Don Williams	UD	10	Sep 21, 1949	Auditorium, Worcester, Massachusetts, U.S.	
109	Loss	69–35–5	Bob Sandberg	UD	10	Sep 1, 1949	Auditorium, Milwaukee, Wisconsin, U.S.	
108	Win	69–34–5	Don Williams	UD	10	Aug 17, 1949	Mechanics Hall, Worcester, Massachusetts, U.S.	
107	Win	68–34–5	Louis Joyce	SD	8	Aug 1, 1949	Fair Grounds Arena, Allentown, Pennsylvania, U.S.	
106	Loss	67–34–5	Guiseppe Colasanti	SD	10	Jul 1, 1949	Long Beach, California, U.S. Stadium, Long Beach, California, U.S.	
105	Win	67–33–5	Mario Moreno	KO	2 (8)	Jun 21, 1949	Fair Grounds Arena, Allentown, Pennsylvania, U.S.	
104	Win	66–33–5	Jimmy Collins	MD	8	Jun 6, 1949	Toppi Stadium, Philadelphia, Pennsylvania, U.S.	
103	Loss	65–33–5	Eddie Giosa	SD	10	May 2, 1949	Metropolitan Opera House, Philadelphia, Pennsylvania, U.S.	
102	Win	65–32–5	Bobby Timpson	TKO	10 (10)	Apr 11, 1949	Metropolitan Opera House, Philadelphia, Pennsylvania, U.S.	
101	Win	64–32–5	Joey Carkido	KO	4 (10)	Mar 28, 1949	Metropolitan Opera House, Philadelphia, Pennsylvania, U.S.	
100	Win	63–32–5	Santa Bucca	KO	4 (10)	Mar 17, 1949	Metropolitan Opera House, Philadelphia, Pennsylvania, U.S.	
99	Loss	62–32–5	Percy Bassett	UD	10	Feb 28, 1949	Arena, Philadelphia, Pennsylvania, U.S.	
98	Win	61–31–5	Chuck Burton	TKO	9 (10)	Jan 31, 1949	Arena, Philadelphia, Pennsylvania, U.S.	
97	Win	60–31–5	Rene Camacho	TKO	2 (10)	Jan 17, 1949	Arena, Philadelphia, Pennsylvania, U.S.	
96	Win	59–31–5	Andres Balderas	KO	3 (10)	Dec 10, 1948	Liberty Hall, El Paso, Texas, U.S.	
95	Win	58–31–5	Nick Castiglione	TKO	4 (10)	Dec 20, 1946	Rainbo Arena, Chicago, Illinois, U.S.	
94	Win	59–31–5	Hubert Gray	KO	10 (10)	Dec 13, 1946	Sportatorium, Dallas, Texas, U.S.	
93	Win	57–31–5	Ted Garcia	TKO	9 (10)	Nov 20, 1946	City Auditorium, Galveston, Texas, U.S.	
92	Win	56–31–5	Tony Davila	KO	1 (10)	Sep 26, 1946	Wright's Arena, Waco, Texas, U.S.	
91	Loss	55–31–5	Louis Flyer	KO	6 (10)	Jun 14, 1946	Sportatorium, Dallas, Texas, U.S.	
90	Loss	55–30–5	Henry Majcher	PTS	10	May 21, 1946	Houston, Texas, U.S.	
89	Win	55–29–5	Johnny Cool	DQ	2 (10)	Jan 29, 1946	Manchester, New Hampshire, U.S.	Cool DQ'd for "not trying"
88	Win	54–29–5	Jack Garrity	KO	1 (10)	Jan 25, 1946	Young Men's Catholic Club Hall, Danbury, Connecticut, U.S.	
87	Win	53–29–5	Jerry Zullo	KO	2 (10)	Jan 1, 1946	Salem Arena, Salem, Massachusetts, U.S.	
86	Loss	52–29–5	Jimmy Doyle	TKO	4 (10)	Dec 3, 1945	Arena, Cleveland, Ohio, U.S.	
85	Loss	52–28–5	John Thomas	TKO	5 (10)	Dec 22, 1942	Olympic Auditorium, Los Angeles, California, U.S.	
84	Loss	52–27–5	Henry Armstrong	TKO	8 (10)	Dec 4, 1942	Auditorium, Portland, Oregon, U.S.	
83	Win	52–26–5	Chato Gonzalez	KO	2 (10)	Nov 18, 1942	Las Vegas, Nevada, U.S.	
82	Loss	51–26–5	Al Tribuani	UD	10	Sep 22, 1942	Wilmington, Delaware, U.S. Park, Wilmington, Delaware, U.S.	
81	Loss	51–25–5	Carmen Notch	SD	10	Aug 27, 1942	Arena Gardens, Detroit, Michigan, U.S.	
80	Loss	51–24–5	Cosby Linson	PTS	10	Aug 17, 1942	Victory Arena, New Orleans, Louisiana, U.S.	
79	Loss	51–23–5	Fritzie Zivic	TKO	10 (10)	May 25, 1942	Forbes Field, Pittsburgh, Pennsylvania, U.S.	
78	Loss	51–22–5	Jackie Byrd	PTS	10	May 13, 1942	Rix Stadium, Hot Springs, Arkansas, U.S.	
77	Loss	51–21–5	Mike Kaplan	UD	10	Mar 27, 1942	Mechanics Building, Boston, Massachusetts, U.S.	
76	Loss	51–20–5	Marty Servo	UD	10	Feb 17, 1942	Arena, Philadelphia, Pennsylvania, U.S.	
75	Loss	51–19–5	Sammy Angott	UD	15	Dec 19, 1941	Madison Square Garden, New York City, New York, U.S.	Lost NYSAC and The Ring lightweight titles; For NBA lightweight title
74	Loss	51–18–5	Freddie Cochrane	UD	10	Oct 6, 1941	Madison Square Garden, New York City, New York, U.S.	
73	Win	51–17–5	Cleo McNeal	KO	3 (10)	Sep 12, 1941	Auditorium, Minneapolis, Minnesota, U.S., Minnesota, U.S.	
72	Win	50–17–5	Joey Zodda	KO	3 (10)	Aug 4, 1941	Meadowbrook Bowl, Newark, New Jersey, U.S.	
71	Loss	49–17–5	Bob Montgomery	UD	10	May 16, 1941	Madison Square Garden, New York City, New York, U.S.	
70	Win	49–16–5	Lou Ambers	TKO	7 (10)	Feb 28, 1941	Madison Square Garden, New York City, New York, U.S.	
69	Draw	48–16–5	Fritzie Zivic	PTS	10	Dec 20, 1940	Madison Square Garden, New York City, New York, U.S.	
68	Win	48–16–4	Pete Lello	KO	2 (15)	Nov 22, 1940	Madison Square Garden, New York City, New York, U.S.	Retained NYSAC and The Ring lightweight titles
67	Win	47–16–4	Bob Montgomery	UD	10	Sep 16, 1940	Shibe Park, Philadelphia, Pennsylvania, U.S.	
66	Loss	46–16–4	Henry Armstrong	TKO	6 (12)	Jul 17, 1940	Polo Grounds, New York City, New York, U.S.	
65	Win	46–15–4	Lou Ambers	TKO	3 (15)	May 10, 1940	Madison Square Garden, New York City, New York, U.S.	Won NYSAC and The Ring lightweight titles
64	Win	45–15–4	Tippy Larkin	KO	1 (15)	Mar 8, 1940	Madison Square Garden, New York City, New York, U.S.	
63	Win	44–15–4	Chino Alvarez	KO	1 (10)	Jan 24, 1940	Sportatorium, Dallas, Texas, U.S.	
62	Win	43–15–4	William Marquart	KO	3 (8)	Dec 15, 1939	Madison Square Garden, New York City, New York, U.S.	
61	Win	42–15–4	Mike Belloise	TKO	7 (8)	Nov 21, 1939	New York Coliseum, New York City, New York, U.S.	
60	Win	41–15–4	Primo Flores	TKO	5 (8)	Oct 10, 1939	New York Coliseum, New York City, New York, U.S.	
59	Win	40–15–4	Primo Flores	TKO	4 (8)	Sep 12, 1939	New York Coliseum, New York City, New York, U.S.	
58	Win	39–15–4	Ginger Foran	KO	4 (8)	Sep 5, 1939	Queensboro Arena, New York City, New York, U.S.	
57	Win	38–15–4	Quentin Breese	PTS	8	Aug 15, 1939	Queensboro Arena, New York City, New York, U.S.	
56	Win	37–15–4	Joey Fontana	PTS	8	Aug 1, 1939	Queensboro Arena, New York City, New York, U.S.	
55	Win	36–15–4	Quentin Breese	PTS	8	Jul 18, 1939	Queensboro Arena, New York City, New York, U.S.	
54	Win	35–15–4	Jorge Morelia	PTS	10	Jun 19, 1939	Walkathon Arena, San Antonio, Texas, U.S.	
53	Win	34–15–4	Roberto Gomez	TKO	2 (10)	Jun 5, 1939	Walkathon Arena, San Antonio, Texas, U.S.	
52	Loss	33–15–4	Manuel Villa II	PTS	10	May 31, 1939	40 & 8 Arena, Corpus Christi, Texas, U.S.	
51	Win	33–14–4	Jimmy Hatcher	KO	4 (10)	May 26, 1939	Sportatorium, Dallas, Texas, U.S.	
50	Loss	32–14–4	Carlos Malacara	PTS	10	May 13, 1939	Mexico City, Distrito Federal, Mexico	
49	Win	32–13–4	Panchito Campos	KO	1 (10)	May 6, 1939	El Toreo de Cuatro Caminos, Mexico City, Distrito Federal, Mexico	
48	Loss	31–13–4	Pedro Ortega	PTS	10	Apr 29, 1939	Mexico City, Distrito Federal, Mexico	
47	Loss	31–12–4	Pete Lello	KO	7 (8)	Mar 24, 1939	White City Arena, Chicago, Illinois, U.S.	
46	Win	31–11–4	Sammy Musco	KO	6 (10)	Mar 15, 1939	40 & 8 Arena, Corpus Christi, Texas, U.S.	
45	Win	30–11–4	KO Borrado	KO	2 (10)	Mar 8, 1939	40 & 8 Arena, Corpus Christi, Texas, U.S.	
44	Win	29–11–4	Jack Darcy	PTS	6	Mar 3, 1939	Sportatorium, Dallas, Texas, U.S.	
43	Loss	28–11–4	Willie Joyce	SD	8	Feb 24, 1939	White City Arena, Chicago, Illinois, U.S.	
42	Loss	28–10–4	Willie Joyce	SD	8	Feb 17, 1939	White City Arena, Chicago, Illinois, U.S.	
41	Win	28–9–4	Kid Leyva	KO	3 (10)	Feb 10, 1939	40 & 8 Arena, Corpus Christi, Texas, U.S.	
40	Win	27–9–4	Sammy Scully	KO	5 (10)	Jan 31, 1939	White City Arena, Chicago, Illinois, U.S.	
39	Draw	26–9–4	Willie Joyce	SD	10	Jan 20, 1939	White City Arena, Chicago, Illinois, U.S.	
38	Win	26–9–3	Joe Law	PTS	6	Jan 6, 1939	White City Arena, Chicago, Illinois, U.S.	
37	Win	25–9–3	Ted Tallos	PTS	6	Dec 29, 1938	Sportatorium, Dallas, Texas, U.S.	
36	Loss	24–9–3	Wesley Ramey	PTS	10	Dec 16, 1938	Sportatorium, Dallas, Texas, U.S.	Lost USA Texas State lightweight title
35	Win	24–8–3	Sammy Musco	UD	10	Dec 2, 1938	Sportatorium, Dallas, Texas, U.S.	
34	Win	23–8–3	Young Ernest	KO	2 (10)	Nov 22, 1938	34 East Concho Arena, San Angelo, Texas, U.S.	
33	Loss	22–8–3	Lew Feldman	MD	10	Nov 17, 1938	Sportatorium, Dallas, Texas, U.S.	
32	Draw	22–7–3	Sammy Musco	PTS	10	Nov 9, 1938	40 & 8 Arena, Corpus Christi, Texas, U.S.	
31	Win	22–7–2	Carl Faust	KO	8 (15)	Nov 3, 1938	Sportatorium, Dallas, Texas, U.S.	Won vacant USA Texas State lightweight title
30	Win	21–7–2	Carl Faust	TKO	8 (10)	Oct 20, 1938	Sportatorium, Dallas, Texas, U.S.	
29	Win	20–7–2	Luis Orozco	KO	1 (10)	Oct 6, 1938	Sportatorium, Dallas, Texas, U.S.	
28	Win	19–7–2	Don Eddy	TKO	8 (8)	Sep 30, 1938	Sportatorium, Dallas, Texas, U.S.	
27	Win	18–7–2	Jack Griffin	PTS	6	Sep 16, 1938	Sportatorium, Dallas, Texas, U.S.	
26	Win	17–7–2	Cullen Williams	KO	3 (10)	Sep 7, 1938	40 & 8 Arena, Corpus Christi, Texas, U.S.	
25	Win	16–7–2	Zeke Castro	PTS	6	Aug 23, 1938	Olympic Auditorium, Los Angeles, California, U.S.	
24	Loss	15–7–2	Chino Alvarez	TKO	8 (10)	Jul 29, 1938	Sportatorium, Dallas, Texas, U.S.	
23	Win	15–6–2	Willard Brown	KO	4 (10)	Jul 22, 1938	Sportatorium, Dallas, Texas, U.S.	
22	Loss	14–6–2	Bobby Britton	KO	7 (10)	May 27, 1938	Sportatorium, Dallas, Texas, U.S.	
21	Win	14–5–2	Chief Evening Thunder	KO	8 (10)	May 13, 1938	Sportatorium, Dallas, Texas, U.S.	
20	Loss	13–5–2	Wesley Ramey	PTS	10	Apr 28, 1938	Sportatorium, Dallas, Texas, U.S.	
19	Win	13–4–2	Lew Feldman	SD	10	Apr 8, 1938	Sportatorium, Dallas, Texas, U.S.	
18	Win	12–4–2	Jackie Sharkey	KO	2 (10)	Apr 1, 1938	Sportatorium, Dallas, Texas, U.S.	
17	Win	11–4–2	Ramon Serrano	KO	2 (10)	Mar 18, 1938	Sportatorium, Dallas, Texas, U.S.	
16	Win	10–4–2	Louis Arriola	TKO	5 (10)	Mar 11, 1938	Sportatorium, Dallas, Texas, U.S.	
15	Win	9–4–2	Frankie Graham	TKO	4 (10)	Feb 18, 1938	Sportatorium, Dallas, Texas, U.S.	
14	Win	8–4–2	Jackie Conway	KO	2 (6)	Feb 4, 1938	Sportatorium, Dallas, Texas, U.S.	
13	Win	7–4–2	Young Ernest	KO	5 (6)	Jan 28, 1938	Sportatorium, Dallas, Texas, U.S.	
12	Win	6–4–2	Kid Leyva	TKO	5 (8)	Jan 14, 1938	Sportatorium, Dallas, Texas, U.S.	
11	Draw	5–4–2	Ramon Serrano	PTS	6	Jan 11, 1938	Olympiad Arena, Houston, Texas, U.S.	
10	Loss	5–4–1	Midget Mexico	PTS	6	Sep 22, 1937	40 & 8 Arena, Corpus Christi, Texas, U.S.	
9	Win	5–3–1	Billy Firpo	PTS	8	Jul 4, 1937	Silver City, New Mexico, U.S.	
8	Win	4–3–1	Alberto Pena	TKO	2 (8)	Apr 24, 1937	Silver City, New Mexico, U.S.	
7	Draw	3–3–1	Billy Firpo	PTS	10	Apr 15, 1937	Silver City, New Mexico, U.S.	
6	Win	3–3	Cullen Williams	PTS	4	May 21, 1936	Sportatorium, Dallas, Texas, U.S.	
5	Win	2–3	Sailor Fay Kosky	PTS	4	Mar 5, 1936	Silver City, New Mexico, U.S.	
4	Loss	1–3	Ray Carrillo	PTS	4	Dec 13, 1935	Madison Square Garden, Phoenix, Arizona, U.S.	
3	Win	1–2	Lee Mullins	PTS	4	Dec 2, 1935	Madison Square Garden, Phoenix, Arizona, U.S.	
2	Loss	0–2	Gene Noble	TKO	4 (4)	Jul 22, 1935	West Texas Open Air Arena, Abilene, Texas, U.S.	
1	Loss	0–1	Bobby Reed	PTS	8	Jul 8, 1935	West Texas Open Air Arena, Abilene, Texas, U.S.	

== Boxing achievements and honors ==
Achievements
Preceded by Lou Ambers	World Lightweight Champion; May 10, 1940 – Dec 19, 1941	Succeeded by Sammy Angott

== See also ==
- Lineal championship
- List of lightweight boxing champions
