= Milburn, Texas =

- unincorporated community
- Location within the state of Texas Milburn, Texas (the United States)
- Coordinates: 31°26′16″N 99°06′35″W
- Country: United States
- State: Texas
- County: McCulloch
- Elevation: 1,312 ft (400 m)
- Time zone: UTC-6 (Central (CST))
  - Summer (DST): UTC-5 (CDT)
- ZIP code: 76825
- Area code: 325
- GNIS feature ID: 1380197

Milburn is an unincorporated farming and ranching community established in 1873 in the county of McCulloch, in the U.S. state of Texas. It is the birthplace of the former boxer Lew Jenkins.
