= Quentin Breese =

American boxer (1918–1962)

Quentin Terrance "Baby" Breese (July 8, 1918 – August 21, 1962) was an American professional boxer.

== Early life ==
Quentin Breese was born in 1918 in Leonardville, Kansas, of Irish and English descent. He began boxing when he was a young boy in school and had his first professional fight in 1937 when he knocked out Al Freida in Kansas City in four rounds. Breese battled Lew Jenkins twice in 1939 and squared off against Sammy Angott the following year. Both Jenkins and Angott later wore the lightweight crown. Breese went on to become a local celebrity and earned the nickname "Baby" because he looked more like a child than a fighter. Standing at only 5'6" tall and weighing in at 137 pounds, he was ranked as one of the first ten lightweights in the world.

Breese's fame brought him to Hollywood, where he worked alongside James Cagney in City for Conquest (1940) and Robert Ryan in Golden Gloves (also 1940), teaching them boxing moves and by being a stand-in for the fight scenes. He continued to work on film in Hollywood until World War II started. Many ring-wise veterans share the opinion that Breese might have battled his way to the top of the welterweight class had not the war interrupted his career.

Breese joined the Marines on May 13, 1943 and was assigned to the USS Wilkes-Barre. He was present during the fire on the USS Bunker Hill in 1945, as well as when the Japanese surrendered on September 2 of that year.

== Postwar boxing career ==
On January 1, 1946 Breese was discharged from the Marine Corps and returned to boxing. A year later, Breese realized that the war years had taken their toll on his legs. Fighting Eddie Hudson, a courageous campaigner but definitely not in Breese's class during the prime of the ex-Marine, Baby lost a 10-round decision, his second to the Los Angeles boxer. Immediately after the bout he announced that he would head east and if he couldn't regain his old zip he would hang up his gloves. Four fights later, he met Juste Fontaine in Milwaukee and lost. Quentin kept his promise and retired, returning to San Diego to establish the Breese Paint Company on Fifth Avenue.

On February 4, 1950, the San Diego Journal reported, "From that time until he retired in 1947, Breese gained a reputation as a competitor. He plied his trade in 19 different United States cities and Mexico City, swapping blows with the best in the business during 125 bouts. During his fistic career he compiled 91 victories, 27 defeats and seven draws. The Baby's right was a lethal weapon and one half of those men whom he defeated ended up getting rocked to sleep by his punching prowess. His record might have been more impressive had he not insisted on meeting any and all comers. He often went in other rings as many as four times in one month."

== Later life ==
Breese's business was doing well and he decided to buy land in the University Heights area of San Diego and have a house built. He also bought a white Thunderbird for his wife, Ila, and a beauty shop named Juniper's Beauty Shop on Juniper Avenue. Still considered a celebrity, Breese hosted many parties at his custom-built house and attended many parties at the Mississippi Room at the Imig Manor, later known as The Lafayette Hotel and Club, where Hollywood's most glamorous stars came to dine and dance.

Breese's health became worse over the next ten years. Doctors speculated that his boxing had caused him permanent injuries, and during a party he was hosting at his house in August 1962, he became ill. An ambulance took him to Mercy Hospital, where he died ten days later.

San Diego remembered Breese by putting flags up and down the sidewalks of Fifth Avenue and inducting him into the San Diego Hall of Champions in Balboa Park.

Ila sold the paint store and went back to work at her beauty shop. She drove herself there every day for thirty-five years in the same white Thunderbird that Quentin had bought for her in the 1960s. Ila never remarried and she and Breese never had children. She died in November 2001.

== Sources ==
- What They are Doing Now, San Diego Evening Tribune, Feb. 20 1950
- Career Cut Short, San Diego Journal, page 5. Academic Press, 1950
