= Boxing in the 1940s =

Boxing in the 1940s in many ways reflected worldwide events that affected other endeavors as well.

World War II raged early in the decade, and just like baseballers, many popular boxers went overseas to fight for their countries, Joe Louis, Billy Conn, Beau Jack, and Bob Montgomery among them. Louis was used to entice Americans to join the war against Germany, a couple of propaganda movies starring Louis and many propaganda posters being produced. The posters in particular are collector's items today. Louis' great rival, Max Schmeling, a lifelong opponent of the Nazi regime, was forced by Adolf Hitler to join the German military after his loss to Louis at their 1938 rematch.

Because of the war many world championship divisions were frozen. Sometimes, a title bout was held five years after the last title bout in that division had been held.

Television was in its infancy in the 1940s, but nonetheless, viewers were treated to many 10-round, non-title fights, and many crown challengers became household names under the absence of so many world champions.

The 1940s did have some historic world title fights and rivalries. Sugar Ray Robinson and Jake LaMotta began their series of famous bouts towards the middle of the decade, Jack and Montgomery fought four times, and Rocky Graziano and Tony Zale starred in what boxing critics have often called one of the fiercest rivalries in boxing history.

The heavyweight division was dominated by Louis, the only man in history to be world champion throughout every year of a decade. He became world champion in 1937 and kept the title until 1949.

LaMotta lost a highly controversial fight to Billy Fox in 1947. LaMotta later testified he threw the fight to earn a title shot at world middleweight champion Marcel Cerdan,

== 1941 ==
- January 13 – Anton Christoforidis becomes the first Greek world boxing champion in history, beating Melio Bettina by a fifteen-round decision for the National Boxing Association's vacant world Light-Heavyweight title, in Cleveland.
- January 17 – Fritzie Zivic retains his world Welterweight title with a twelfth-round knockout of Henry Armstrong at their New York City rematch.
- May 22 – Gus Lesnevich wins the world Light-Heavyweight title, with a fifteen-round decision over Anton Christoforidis, at New York.
- May 23 – In an extremely controversial bout, Joe Louis retains his world Heavyweight title with a seventh round disqualification win over Max Baer's brother, Buddy Baer. After the bell to end round six, Louis landed a blow that dropped Baer. Said time-keeper Billy Dechard: Joe hit Baer at least three seconds after the bell sounded. Looking for a disqualification win, Baer's manager announced his fighter would not come out for round seven, and Baer wound up getting disqualified instead. The controversial fight took place in Washington, DC.
- June 18 – Behind on the scorecards, Joe Louis scores a thirteenth-round knockout of former world Light-Heavyweight champion Billy Conn to retain the world Heavyweight title, at New York.
- July 29 – Freddie Cochrane wins the world Welterweight title, defeating Fritzie Zivic with a fifteen-round decision, in Newark.

== 1942 ==
- January 9 – In a rematch of their controversial 1941 bout, Joe Louis retains his world Heavyweight title with a first-round knockout of Buddy Baer, at New York City. The fight is fought as a benefit to the New York Auxiliary of the Naval Relief Society.
- February 13 – Former world Light-Heavyweight champion Billy Conn beats world Middleweight champion Tony Zale by a twelve-round unanimous decision in a non-title bout, at New York. This would be Conn's last fight in four years, as he would go on to serve in World War II.
- June 20 – Freddie Mills conquers the British version of the world Light-Heavyweight title with a second-round knockout over Len Harvey, in London.
- August 7 – Manuel Ortiz becomes world Bantamweight champion with a twelve-round unanimous decision over Lou Salica, in Hollywood.
- November 20 – -Willie Pep wins the world Featherweight championship with a fifteen-round decision over Chalky Wright, at New York

== 1943 ==
- February 5 – In their second of their classic six fight rivalry, Jake LaMotta defeats Sugar Ray Robinson by a ten-round unanimous decision, in Detroit. This fight would be portrayed 37 years later in LaMotta's biographic movie, Raging Bull.
- March 10 – Manuel Ortiz retains his world Bantamweight title with an eleventh-round knockout of former world champion Lou Salica, at their Oakland rematch.
- June 8 – Willie Pep retains his world featherweight title with a fifteen-round decision over future world champion Sal Bartolo, in Boston.
- June 19 – Jackie Paterson wins the world's Flyweight title with a first-round knockout of defending champion Peter Kane, in Glasgow, Scotland.
- August 27 – Sugar Ray Robinson beats his childhood hero, Henry Armstrong, by a ten-round unanimous decision, at New York.
- November 19 – Beau Jack and Bob Montgomery fight the second of their four-fight series, as Jack beats Montgomery by a fifteen-round unanimous decision for New York state's version of the world Lightweight championship.

== 1944 ==
- March 3 – The third chapter of the Bob Montgomery-Beau Jack rivalry, as Montgomery beats Jack by a fifteen-round decision, at New York City.
- March 10 – Sal Bartolo beats Phil Terranova by a decision in fifteen rounds to win the National Boxing Association's world Featherweight title, in Boston. Nonetheless, Willie Pep continues being recognized as the sole world Featherweight champion by most fans and the press.
- May 5 – Sal Bartolo retains his NBA world Featherweight title with a fifteen-round decision over Phil Terranova at their Boston rematch.
- August 4 – The "War Bonds Fight", $36m is raised to fund the war effort as Beau Jack wins a ten-round decision over arch-rival Bob Montgomery in New York. A few weeks later, they were both drafted on the same day by the Army.
- September 9 – Willie Pep retains the world Featherweight title with a fifteen-round decision over Chalky Wright at their New York rematch.
- September 12 – Manuel Ortiz retains the world Bantamweight title with a fourth-round knockout over Luis Castillo, in Los Angeles.
- November 14 – Manuel Ortiz once again retains his world Bantamweight title with a knockout over Luis Castillo in Los Angeles, this time in round nine.

== 1945 ==
(note on boxing in 1945: because of the events of World War II during this year, there were only two world championship boxing bouts in 1945).

- February 19 – Willie Pep retains his world Featherweight title with a fifteen-round decision over Phil Terranova, in New York City.
- February 24 – Sugar Ray Robinson and Jake LaMotta fight chapter four of their rivalry. Robinson wins a ten-round unanimous decision, at New York.
- April 18 – Ike Williams wins the National Boxing Association's world Lightweight title, knocking out champion Juan Zurita in two rounds, at Mexico City, Mexico.
- September 28 – Rocky Graziano stops Harold Green in two rounds at New York. Green later claimed he was paid to lose the fight.

== 1946 ==
- June 7 – Willie Pep unifies the world Featherweight title with a twelve-round knockout victory over Sal Bartolo, at New York City.
- June 19 – In a rematch of their 1941 bout, Joe Louis retains the world Heavyweight title with an eighth-round knockout over former world Light Heavyweight champion Billy Conn, in New York.
- September 27 – Tony Zale and Rocky Graziano fight each other for the first time, starting one of boxing's most notorious rivalries. World Middleweight champion Zale retains the crown, knocking out Graziano in round six, at New York.
- December 20 – Sugar Ray Robinson becomes world champion for the first time, defeating Tommy Bell by a fifteen-round unanimous decision for the vacant world Welterweight championship, in New York.

== 1947 ==
- January 6 – Harold Dade becomes world Bantamweight champion, knocking out Manuel Ortiz in six rounds, at San Francisco.
- February 28 – Gus Lesnevich retains his world Light-Heavyweight title with a tenth-round knockout over Billy Fox (the guy against whom Jake LaMotta later alleged to have thrown a fight), in New York City.
- March 11 – In their rematch, Manuel Ortiz regains the world Bantamweight title with a fifteen-round decision over Harold Dade, in Los Angeles.
- July 16 – Rocky Graziano becomes world Middleweight champion, knocking out Tony Zale in round six of the second chapter of their boxing rivalry.
- August 4 – Ike Williams unifies the world Lightweight title with a sixth-round knockout over Bob Montgomery, at their Philadelphia rematch.
- October 20 – Rinty Monaghan regains the world Flyweight title (National Boxing Association version) with a fifteen-round decision over Dado Marino, in London.
- December 5 – Joe Louis retains his world Heavyweight title for the 24th time, with a fifteen-round split decision over Jersey Joe Walcott, in New York.

== 1948 ==
- February 20 – Tragedy strikes, as light heavyweight Ezzard Charles defeats middleweight Sam Baroudi in Chicago, by a knockout in round ten. Baroudi died as a consequence of the blows suffered, on February 21.
- March 5 – In their rematch, world Light-Heavyweight champion Gus Lesnevich retains the title with a first-round knockout over Billy Fox, at New York City.
- March 18 — Heavyweight Lee Savold knocked out Gino Buonvino, the Italian heavyweight champion, in 54 seconds, breaking the Madison Square Garden record for the fastest knock out in a main event bout. The record was broken in 2007, almost 60 years later.
- March 23 – Rinty Monaghan unifies the world's Flyweight title with a seventh-round knockout win over Jackie Patterson in Belfast, Northern Ireland, then gets accidentally knocked out himself by a well wisher during the ensuing party.
- June 10 – The final chapter of the Zale-Graziano trilogy, as Tony Zale defeats Rocky Graziano by knockout in round three to regain the world's Middleweight title, in Newark.
- June 25 – Joe Louis retains his world Heavyweight title for the twenty-fifth and final time, this time knocking out Jersey Joe Walcott in round eleven of their New York rematch. Louis would retire, officially leaving the title, in 1949. His twenty five title defenses are a record for any division in boxing.
- July 11 – Ike Williams retains the world Lightweight title with a sixth-round knockout over former two time world champion Beau Jack, in Philadelphia, Pennsylvania.
- July 26 – Freddie Mills outpoints Gus Lesvenich over fifteen rounds in London, to win the world's Light-Heavyweight title.
- September 23 – Marcel Cerdan conquers the world Middleweight title with a twelfth-round knockout win over Tony Zale, in Jersey City.
- October 29 – In the first fight of their notorious boxing rivalry, Sandy Saddler conquers the world Featherweight title, defeating Willie Pep by a fourth-round knockout, in New York.

== 1949 ==
- February 11 – Willie Pep recovers the world Featherweight title, beating Sandy Saddler by a fifteen-round unanimous decision, in the second of their four bout rivalry, at New York City.
- February 28 – future world champions Ezzard Charles and Joey Maxim meet at Cincinnati, with Charles winning a ten-round majority decision.
- March 1 – Joe Louis announces his retirement, leaving the world Heavyweight title vacant after 11 years, six months, and a world record 25 defenses as world champion.
- March 1 – Manuel Ortiz retains his world Bantamweight title with a fifteen-round unanimous decision over Dado Marino for his eighteenth title defense, a division record, in their Honolulu rematch.
- June 16 – Jake LaMotta wins the world Middleweight championship, knocking out Marcel Cerdan in ten rounds, at Detroit.
- June 21 – Ezzard Charles wins the vacant NBA world Heavyweight title, defeating Jersey Joe Walcott, by a fifteen-round unanimous decision, in Chicago.
- July 11 – Sugar Ray Robinson retains the world Welterweight title with a fifteen-round unanimous decision over future world champion Kid Gavilán, in Philadelphia.
- August 10 – Ezzard Charles retains his NBA world Heavyweight title, knocking out world Light-Heavyweight champion Gus Lesnevich in round eight, at New York. The NYSAC did not recognize this bout as a title defense or title bout. Both boxers weighed under 180 lbs.
- October 27 – Marcel Cerdan dies when his plane, an Air France Constellation, crashes over the Azores when he was returning to the United States for a rematch with Jake LaMotta.
- December 6 – Sandy Saddler wins the vacant world Jr. Lightweight title, defeating Orlando Zulueta by a fifteen-round decision in the last title fight of the decade, held at Cleveland.
