= Chalky Wright =

American boxer (1912–1957)

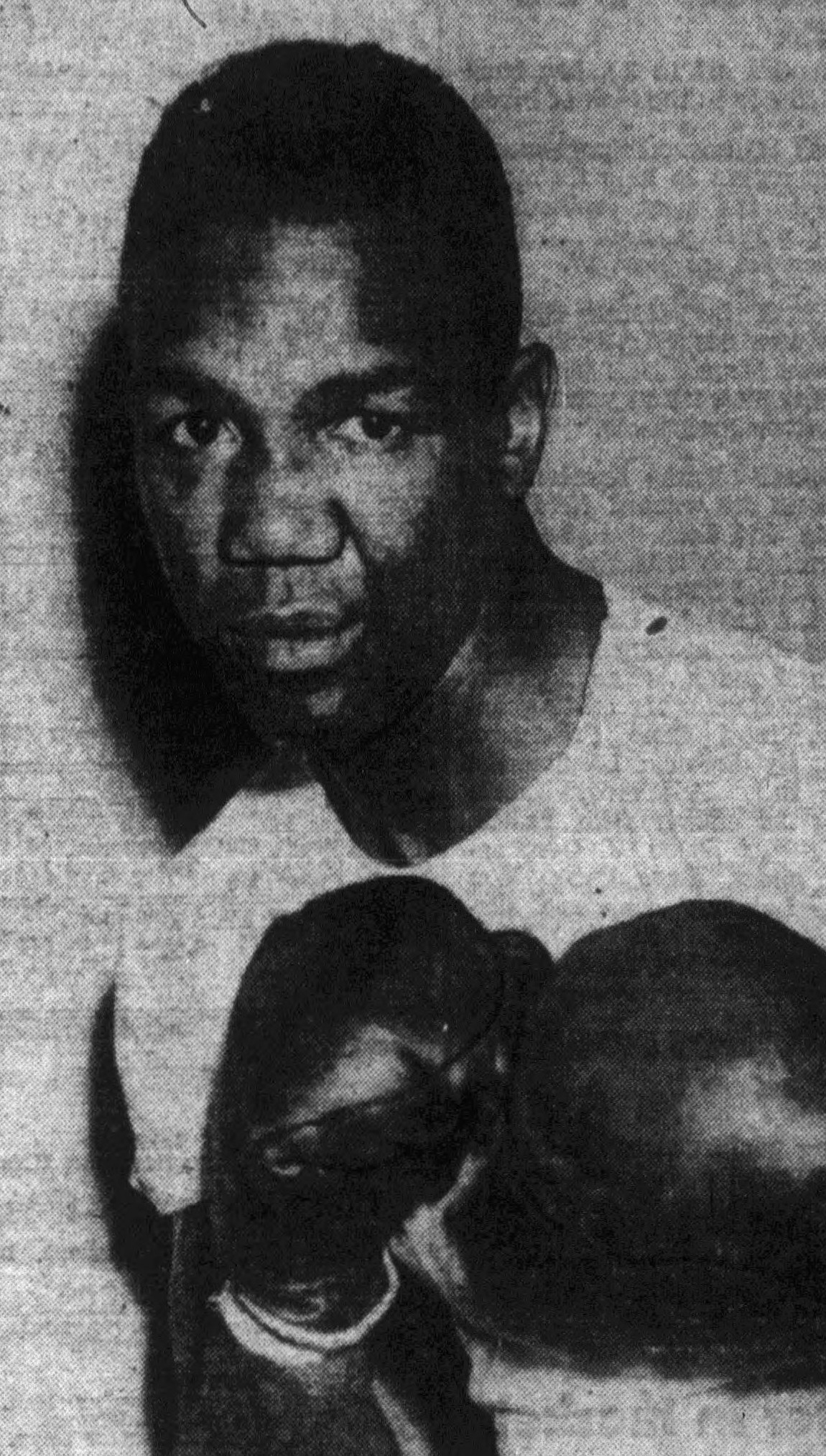
- Wright, circa 1946

Personal information
- Nickname: Chalky
- Born: Albert Martin; February 1, 1912 Willcox, Arizona, U.S.
- Died: August 12, 1957 (aged 45) Los Angeles, California, U.S.
- Weight: Featherweight

Boxing career
- Stance: Orthodox

Boxing record
- Total fights: 238
- Wins: 171
- Win by KO: 83
- Losses: 44
- Draws: 19
- No contests: 2

Albert "Chalky" Wright (February 1, 1912 – August 12, 1957) was an American featherweight boxer who fought from 1928 to 1948 and held the world featherweight championship in 1941–1942. His career record was 171 wins (with 87 knockouts), 46 losses and 19 draws. In 2003, Wright ranked #95 on The Ring magazine's list of the 100 Greatest Punchers of All-Time.

== Early years and family ==
Wright was born in Willcox, Arizona, though a few sources erroneously give Wright's place of birth as Durango, Colorado, or Durango, Mexico), the youngest of seven children born to James ("Jim") and Clara Wright (née Martin). Wright's maternal grandfather, Caleb Baines Martin, was a runaway slave from Natchez, Mississippi, who fled to the Arizona Territory shortly before the Civil War. After serving in the Union Army as a Buffalo Soldier, he homesteaded 160 acres in Graham County, Arizona. He bought cattle from Colonel Henry Hooker and established a dairy ranch on the property (which eventually grew to 640 acres), making him the first African American ranch owner in Southwest Arizona. He supplied dairy produce to Fort Grant and surrounding settlers.

Wright's father was born in Mexico and also raised cattle. Wright's mother worked as a housekeeper. Shortly after Wright's birth, his father left the family. Around 1918, Clara Wright moved her children to Colton, California. It was there that Wright developed a love for boxing.

== Professional career ==
Wright began his professional boxing career at the age of 16, boxing for the San Bernardino Boxing Club. The five-foot, 7½-inch Wright was unusually tall for his 126-pound weight, giving him a long reach. His first fight took place on February 23, 1928 against Nilo Balle, who he defeated in four rounds. Wright began fighting on the East Coast of the United States in 1938, losing a knockout to Henry Armstrong. Armstrong, however was impressed with his boxing style, and began using Wright as a sparring partner. Impressed with his technique, Armstrong's manager Eddie Walker picked up Wright as a client. He began winning again, and by 1938 was moving up rapidly in the ranks.

By 1941, he was among the world's top featherweight boxers. He beat Sal Bartolo on May 22 at Madison Square Garden to get a chance at the New York State Athletic Commission featherweight championship then held by Joey Archibald. The modest crowd of 4,000 booed the decision for Wright, favoring the younger, whiter, and more regional Italian Bartolo from Boston.

Wright's pre-match regimen was described as "unorthodox" by the Baltimore Afro-American. Before the Terranova fight Chalky was in and out of the Hotel Theresa bar for four days. He smoked evil smelling, twisted cigars. He drank freely of whatever his palate called for. He went where he wanted as late as 2 and 3 a.m., and then climbed into the ring at the Garden to put on a master exhibition of boxing and hitting power.

=== Taking the world featherweight title, September 1941 ===
On September 11, 1941, Wright dethroned reigning New York State Athletic Commission's (NYSAC) world featherweight champion Joey Archibald with a TKO in the eleventh round in Washington, D.C., taking the featherweight title, as recognized by the NYSAC and Maryland. A left hook to the body and a right to the jaw ended the eleventh, 54 seconds after the bell. Wright had kept his left jabbing and hooking to the face of his opponent and his rights to the body were equally punishing. Archibald fought back well after the first few rounds, and showed excellent footwork, but was unable to hurt or slow Wright.

Wright successfully defended the title against former champion Harry Jeffra gaining a tenth-round technical knockout on June 19, 1942 in Baltimore. The first six rounds remained somewhat close, but Jeffra was badly hurt in the seventh and eighth, as he lost his speed and fell victim to Wright. Jeffra was floored for a count of nine in the ninth, and his defeat looked in inevitable, as Wright continued to bang away at him after he arose for the rest of the round. As Wright continued to land blows against the nearly defenseless Jeffra in the opening of the tenth, the referee stopped the bout, coming between the contestants to end the match.

Before a crowd of 12,000, Wright successfully defended his title again on September 25, 1942 against LuLu Constantino in a fifteen-round split decision at Madison Square Garden. The Associated Press gave Wright nine rounds, with five to Constantino, and one even. Wright did most of his work from the fifth round on, and clearly had the edge in the eighth through fifteenth.

==== Losing the world featherweight title, November 1942 ====
He lost his title in a fifteen-round unanimous decision before a crowd of 19,000, Willie Pep, eight years his junior, on November 20, 1942 at Madison Square Garden. Pep, who made his fiftieth straight victory, used brilliant blocking and adroit shifting of his body along the ropes to defend the strong punching of his opponent. Pep used well timed left jabs effectively at many points in the bout, which was not entirely one-sided. The Associated Press gave Wright four rounds, including the fifth through seventh, but strongly favored Pep, who won decisively, with eleven.

Still fighting in 1946, he won only two of eleven remaining fights, bucking the odds and continuing to box as he turned an "ancient" thirty-four years of age. He finally retired March 9, 1948, after losing to Ernie Hunick when he did not answer the bell for the fourth round.

== Post boxing career ==
After his retirement, Wright worked as a trainer for lightweight contender Tommy Campbell. In January 1954, Jet magazine reported that Wright claimed he had written his autobiography, Me and You, under the pen name "Jay Caldwell". The book remains unreleased.

In October 1954, Wright opened a bar in Los Angeles called the "Knockout Lounge". He claimed that all of the bartenders were ex-boxers. By the mid-1950s, Wright had gambled away the fortune he had earned as a boxer. At the time of his death, he was working in a Los Angeles bakery.

== Personal life ==
Wright was married twice and had one child. His first marriage, which ended in divorce, was to Gertrude "Gert" Arnold. His subsequent marriage to Jennie Batch in 1937 produced a son, Albert James. They were separated at the time of his death.

=== Confidential magazine scandal ===
In the 1930s, Wright became friendly with actress Mae West. West was a boxing fan and helped to finance Wright's boxing career. He eventually became her live-in bodyguard and chauffeur for a time. The two reportedly began a romantic relationship though both publicly denied this.

In November 1955, the popular tabloid Confidential wrote an exposé, titled "Mae West's Open Door Policy". The story, intended to raise scandal and arouse interest, described West's live-in love affair with the "bronze boxer" and how she frequently gave Wright hundreds of dollars to gamble. West denied the story and sued for libel and defamation. She won the suit and Confidential published a retraction. In August 1957, a highly publicized criminal libel case was brought against Confidential to expose the tactics used by the magazine's writers. Celebrity testimony was to include that of both West and Wright. Though Wright died before he could testify, West testified a writer for Confidential had approached Wright falsely claiming he wanted information on West for a biographical film. West noted that Wright was paid $200 for the information, but insisted "...he didn't say any of the things they claim he did."

== Death ==
By 1957, Wright was in ill health, and had been hospitalized in July for a heart condition. On August 12, 1957, Wright's mother found his body in the bathtub in her Los Angeles apartment. His head was submerged underwater and the tap was running. Rumors of foul play and suicide immediately began to surface as Wright was scheduled to testify in the high-profile libel suit against Confidential magazine. These rumors were furthered when Wright's first wife Gert Arnold, who was expected to testify, claimed she received an anonymous phone call from a "gruff voiced man" who told her "...if you know what's good for you, you'll clam up about this whole thing."

It was later determined that Wright, who had been hospitalized for a heart condition six weeks before his death, suffered a heart attack while in the bathtub causing him to slip and fall. He then struck his head on the tap, which rendered him unconscious, and he drowned. Investigators noted that Wright had attempted to stop himself from falling by grabbing a towel rack which was found pulled from the wall. His death was ruled accidental.

Wright's funeral was held on August 26. Baptist minister Henry Armstrong, a former sparring partner, and opponent, delivered the eulogy. He was buried in Lincoln Memorial Park in Carson, California.

== Honors ==
Wright was inducted into the Ring Boxing Hall of Fame in 1976 and the International Boxing Hall of Fame in 1997.

In 2003, The Ring ranked Wright #95 on their 100 Greatest Punchers of All-Time list.

In 2012, Wright was inducted into the Colton, California Sports Hall of Fame.

== Professional boxing record ==
238 fights	171 wins	46 losses
By knockout	87	7
By decision	84	39
Draws	19	
No contests	2	

No.	Result	Record	Opponent	Type	Round	Date	Location	Notes
238	Loss	171–46–19 (2)	Ernie Hunick	RTD	3 (10)	Mar 9, 1948	Fairgrounds Coliseum, Salt Lake City, Utah	
237	Loss	171–45–19 (2)	Larry Cisneros	PTS	10	Jun 24, 1947	Zimmerman Field, Albuquerque, New Mexico	
236	Draw	171–44–19 (2)	Frankie Saucedo	PTS	10	May 12, 1947	Plaza de Toros, Ciudad Juarez, Chihuahua, Mexico	
235	Loss	171–44–18 (2)	Willie Pep	KO	3 (10)	Nov 27, 1946	Auditorium, Milwaukee, Wisconsin	
234	Loss	171–43–18 (2)	Enrique Bolanos	UD	10	Oct 15, 1946	Olympic Auditorium, Los Angeles, California	
233	Loss	171–42–18 (2)	Johnny Dell	PTS	10	Aug 27, 1946	Dexter Park Arena, Woodhaven, Queens, New York City, New York	
232	Loss	171–41–18 (2)	Frankie Moore	PTS	10	Apr 17, 1946	Auditorium, Oakland, California	
231	Loss	171–40–18 (2)	Frankie Moore	KO	1 (10)	Mar 27, 1946	Auditorium, Oakland, California	
230	Win	171–39–18 (2)	Georgie Hansford	RTD	3 (10)	Mar 5, 1946	Auditorium, Milwaukee, Wisconsin	
229	Loss	170–39–18 (2)	Enrique Bolanos	UD	10	Feb 19, 1946	Olympic Auditorium, Los Angeles, California	
228	Win	170–38–18 (2)	Pedro Firpo	UD	10	Jan 25, 1946	St. Nicholas Arena, New York City, New York	
227	Win	169–38–18 (2)	Johnny Bratton	UD	10	Dec 14, 1945	Coliseum Arena, New Orleans, Louisiana	
226	Win	168–38–18 (2)	Leroy Willis	UD	10	Nov 2, 1945	Olympia Stadium, Detroit, Michigan	
225	Win	167–38–18 (2)	Bobby Ruffin	UD	10	Oct 5, 1945	Olympia Stadium, Detroit, Michigan	
224	Win	166–38–18 (2)	Humberto Zavala	UD	10	Sep 21, 1945	Madison Square Garden, New York City, New York	
223	Win	165–38–18 (2)	Enrique Bolanos	SD	10	Aug 28, 1945	Olympic Auditorium, Los Angeles, California	
222	Win	164–38–18 (2)	Henry Jordan	KO	6 (10)	Jul 31, 1945	MacArthur Stadium, Brooklyn, New York City, New York	
221	Win	163–38–18 (2)	Willie Joyce	UD	10	Apr 17, 1945	Olympic Auditorium, Los Angeles, California	
220	NC	162–38–18 (2)	Jackie Wilson	NC	7 (10)	Apr 9, 1945	Coliseum, Baltimore, Maryland	
219	Loss	162–38–18 (1)	Willie Joyce	UD	10	Feb 5, 1945	Arena, Philadelphia, Pennsylvania	
218	Loss	162–37–18 (1)	Willie Pep	UD	10	Dec 5, 1944	Arena, Cleveland, Ohio	
217	Loss	162–36–18 (1)	Willie Pep	UD	15	Sep 29, 1944	Madison Square Garden, New York City, New York	For NYSAC and The Ring featherweight titles
216	Win	162–35–18 (1)	Johnny Cockfield	TKO	5 (10)	Jul 17, 1944	Bain Field, Norfolk, New Jersey	
215	Win	161–35–18 (1)	Ruby Garcia	TKO	8 (10)	Jul 10, 1944	Houston, Texas	
214	Win	160–35–18 (1)	Vince Dell'Orto	KO	3 (10)	Jun 5, 1944	Griffith Stadium, Washington, D.C.	
213	Win	159–35–18 (1)	Sammy Daniels	KO	8 (10)	May 22, 1944	Coliseum, Baltimore, Maryland	
212	Win	158–35–18 (1)	Clyde English	TKO	1 (10)	May 1, 1944	Casino Hall, Scranton, Pennsylvania	
211	Draw	157–35–18 (1)	Young Finnigan	PTS	10	Mar 5, 1944	Estadio Olimpico, Panama City, Panama	
210	Win	157–35–17 (1)	Al Carlos	KO	6 (10)	Feb 6, 1944	Estadio Olimpico, Panama City, Panama	
209	Win	156–35–17 (1)	Baby Al Brown	KO	5 (10)	Jan 23, 1944	Estadio Olimpico, Panama City, Panama	
208	Win	155–35–17 (1)	Al Reasoner	RTD	1 (10)	Nov 19, 1943	Coliseum Arena, New Orleans, Louisiana	
207	Win	154–35–17 (1)	Billy Banks	TKO	5 (10)	Nov 8, 1943	Arena, Philadelphia, Pennsylvania	
206	Win	153–35–17 (1)	Patsy Spataro	TKO	2 (8)	Oct 26, 1943	Broadway Arena, Brooklyn, New York City, New York	
205	Win	152–35–17 (1)	Angel Aviles	TKO	7 (10)	Aug 9, 1943	Griffith Stadium, Washington, D.C.	
204	Loss	151–35–17 (1)	Lulu Costantino	PTS	10	Jul 21, 1943	Lakefront Stadium, Cleveland, Ohio	
203	Win	151–34–17 (1)	National Kid	KO	8 (10)	Jul 3, 1943	Tropical Stadium, Havana, Cuba	
202	Win	150–34–17 (1)	Phil Terranova	KO	5 (15)	Jun 4, 1943	Madison Square Garden, New York City, New York	
201	Win	149–34–17 (1)	Billy Pinti	KO	4 (8)	May 25, 1943	Broadway Arena, Brooklyn, New York City, New York	
200	Win	148–34–17 (1)	Frankie Carto	TKO	8 (10)	May 17, 1943	Coliseum, Baltimore, Maryland	
199	Win	147–34–17 (1)	Joey Pirrone	KO	3 (10)	Mar 10, 1943	Arena, Cleveland, Ohio	
198	Win	146–34–17 (1)	Joey Peralta	PTS	10	Feb 23, 1943	Auditorium, Saint Louis, Missouri	
197	Win	145–34–17 (1)	Morris Parker	KO	4 (10)	Feb 15, 1943	Laurel Garden, Newark, New Jersey	
196	Win	144–34–17 (1)	Joey Peralta	PTS	10	Jan 15, 1943	Madison Square Garden, New York City, New York	
195	Loss	143–34–17 (1)	Willie Pep	UD	15	Nov 20, 1942	Madison Square Garden, New York City, New York	Lost NYSAC and The Ring featherweight titles
194	Win	143–33–17 (1)	Henry Vasquez	TKO	8 (10)	Oct 20, 1942	Arena, New Haven, Connecticut	
193	Win	142–33–17 (1)	Carlos Cuebas	TKO	4 (10)	Oct 13, 1942	Auditorium, Hartford, Connecticut	
192	Win	141–33–17 (1)	Lulu Costantino	SD	15	Sep 25, 1942	Madison Square Garden, New York City, New York	Retained NYSAC and The Ring featherweight titles
191	Win	140–33–17 (1)	Joe Marinelli	KO	2 (10)	Aug 27, 1942	Arena Gardens, Detroit, Michigan	
190	Win	139–33–17 (1)	Curley St Angelo	KO	2 (10)	Aug 15, 1942	Century Stadium, West Springfield, Massachusetts	
189	Loss	138–33–17 (1)	Allie Stolz	UD	10	Aug 6, 1942	Madison Square Garden, New York City, New York	
188	Win	138–32–17 (1)	Lou Transparenti	TKO	4 (15)	Jul 13, 1942	Coliseum, Baltimore, Maryland	
187	Win	137–32–17 (1)	Harry Jeffra	TKO	10 (15)	Jun 19, 1942	Oriole Park, Baltimore, Maryland	Retained NYSAC and The Ring featherweight titles
186	Win	136–32–17 (1)	Lulu Costantino	MD	8	May 7, 1942	St. Nicholas Arena, New York City, New York	
185	Loss	135–32–17 (1)	Vern Bybee	UD	10	Apr 6, 1942	Civic Auditorium, San Francisco, California	
184	Win	135–31–17 (1)	Jorge Morelia	TKO	6 (10)	Mar 24, 1942	Olympic Auditorium, Los Angeles, California	
183	Win	134–31–17 (1)	Richie Fontaine	PTS	10	Feb 18, 1942	Auditorium, Oakland, California	
182	Win	133–31–17 (1)	Richie Lemos	TKO	6 (10)	Feb 3, 1942	Olympic Auditorium, Los Angeles, California	
181	Loss	132–31–17 (1)	Bobby Ruffin	UD	10	Jan 13, 1942	New York Coliseum, Bronx, New York City, New York	
180	Win	132–30–17 (1)	Jorge Morelia	TKO	6 (10)	Nov 28, 1941	Coliseum, San Diego, California	
179	Win	131–30–17 (1)	Ray Lunny	PTS	10	Oct 31, 1941	Civic Auditorium, San Francisco, California	
178	Win	130–30–17 (1)	Leo Rodak	PTS	10	Oct 14, 1941	Uline Arena, Washington, D.C.	
177	Loss	129–30–17 (1)	Joey Peralta	UD	10	Oct 2, 1941	Kingston Armory, Kingston, Pennsylvania	
176	Win	129–29–17 (1)	Joey Archibald	KO	11 (15)	Sep 11, 1941	Griffith Stadium, Washington, D.C.	Won NYSAC and The Ring featherweight titles
175	Win	128–29–17 (1)	Paco Villa	KO	6 (8)	Aug 5, 1941	Queensboro Arena, Long Island City, Queens, New York City, New York	
174	Win	127–29–17 (1)	Jackie Wilson	UD	10	Jul 17, 1941	Oriole Park, Baltimore, Maryland	
173	Win	126–29–17 (1)	Bobby McIntire	TKO	5 (8)	Jun 24, 1941	Queensboro Arena, Long Island City, Queens, New York City, New York	
172	Win	125–29–17 (1)	Lloyd Pine	TKO	2 (10)	Jun 17, 1941	Kingston Armory, Kingston, Pennsylvania	
171	Win	124–29–17 (1)	Guillermo Puentes	PTS	8	Jun 3, 1941	Queensboro Arena, Long Island City, Queens, New York City, New York	
170	Win	123–29–17 (1)	Norment Quarles	PTS	8	May 29, 1941	Garden Pier, Atlantic City, New Jersey	
169	Win	122–29–17 (1)	Sal Bartolo	PTS	8	May 22, 1941	Madison Square Garden, New York City, New York	
168	Win	121–29–17 (1)	Charley Varre	PTS	8	May 1, 1941	St. Nicholas Arena, New York City, New York	
167	Win	120–29–17 (1)	Charles Schnappauf	TKO	5 (10)	Mar 17, 1941	South Main Street Armory, Wilkes-Barre, Pennsylvania	
166	Win	119–29–17 (1)	Texas Lee Harper	KO	3 (10)	Mar 5, 1941	Uline Arena, Washington, D.C.	
165	Win	118–29–17 (1)	Maurice Arnault	TKO	2 (10)	Feb 24, 1941	Carlin's Park, Baltimore, Maryland	
164	Win	117–29–17 (1)	Frankie Terranova	TKO	5 (10)	Feb 19, 1941	Lyric Theatre, Allentown, Pennsylvania	
163	Win	116–29–17 (1)	Norman Rahn	TKO	2 (8)	Feb 4, 1941	Grotto Auditorium, Jersey City, New Jersey	
162	Win	115–29–17 (1)	Norment Quarles	PTS	8	Jan 14, 1941	Grotto Auditorium, Jersey City, New Jersey	
161	Win	114–29–17 (1)	Mel Williams	TKO	5 (8)	Jan 6, 1941	St. Nicholas Arena, New York City, New York	
160	Loss	113–29–17 (1)	Jimmy Leto	MD	10	Dec 9, 1940	Carlin's Park, Baltimore, Maryland	
159	Win	113–28–17 (1)	Teddy Baldwin	TKO	4 (8)	Oct 7, 1940	Arena, Philadelphia, Pennsylvania	
158	Win	112–28–17 (1)	Joey Ferrando	TKO	4 (10)	Sep 9, 1940	Carlin's Park, Baltimore, Maryland	
157	Win	111–28–17 (1)	Paul Junior	TKO	5 (10)	Aug 12, 1940	Gardens, Philadelphia, Pennsylvania	
156	Win	110–28–17 (1)	Joey Silva	TKO	7 (10)	Jul 15, 1940	Carlin's Park, Baltimore, Maryland	
155	Win	109–28–17 (1)	Saverio Turiello	PTS	10	Jun 24, 1940	Carlin's Park, Baltimore, Maryland	
154	Loss	108–28–17 (1)	Herbert Lewis Hardwick	MD	10	Apr 29, 1940	Carlin's Park, Baltimore, Maryland	
153	Win	108–27–17 (1)	Tommy Speigal	PTS	10	Apr 1, 1940	Carlin's Park, Baltimore, Maryland	
152	Win	107–27–17 (1)	Charley Gomer	KO	4 (10)	Mar 11, 1940	Carlin's Park, Baltimore, Maryland	
151	Win	106–27–17 (1)	Mike Martinez	TKO	3 (10)	Feb 22, 1940	Coliseum, Baltimore, Maryland	Martinez sustained a cut eye, causing the fight to be stopped
150	Win	105–27–17 (1)	Frankie Gilmore	MD	8	Feb 19, 1940	Valley Arena, Holyoke, Massachusetts	
149	Loss	104–27–17 (1)	Paul Junior	UD	10	Jan 29, 1940	Exposition Building, Portland, Oregon	
148	Win	104–26–17 (1)	Sammy Julian	PTS	8	Jan 16, 1940	Broadway Arena, Brooklyn, New York City, New York	
147	Win	103–26–17 (1)	Everette Rightmire	PTS	6	Dec 1, 1939	Madison Square Garden, New York City, New York	
146	Loss	102–26–17 (1)	Lew Feldman	UD	10	Sep 18, 1939	Carlin's Park, Baltimore, Maryland	
145	Win	102–25–17 (1)	Billy Bullock	TKO	5 (10)	Aug 21, 1939	Carlin's Park, Baltimore, Maryland	
144	Win	101–25–17 (1)	Teddy Baldwin	PTS	8	Aug 8, 1939	Belmont Park, Garfield, New Jersey	
143	Win	100–25–17 (1)	Richie Tanner	KO	7 (10)	Jun 8, 1939	The Stadium, Liverpool, Merseyside, England	
142	Win	99–25–17 (1)	George Daly	PTS	8	May 25, 1939	Harringay Arena, Harringay, London, England	
141	Win	98–25–17 (1)	Dan McAllister	TKO	5 (10)	Apr 27, 1939	The Stadium, Liverpool, Merseyside, England	
140	Win	97–25–17 (1)	Carl Guggino	PTS	8	Mar 21, 1939	Broadway Arena, Brooklyn, New York City, New York	
139	Win	96–25–17 (1)	Joe De Jesus	KO	2 (10)	Mar 11, 1939	Rockland Palace, New York City, New York	
138	Loss	95–25–17 (1)	Johnny Bellus	PTS	8	Feb 14, 1939	New York Coliseum, Bronx, New York City, New York	
137	Loss	95–24–17 (1)	Lew Feldman	PTS	8	Jan 31, 1939	Broadway Arena, Brooklyn, New York City, New York	
136	Win	95–23–17 (1)	Johnny Rohrig	PTS	8	Jan 14, 1939	Ridgewood Grove, Brooklyn, New York City, New York	
135	Win	94–23–17 (1)	Tommy Speigal	PTS	10	Jan 3, 1939	Broadway Arena, Brooklyn, New York City, New York	
134	Loss	93–23–17 (1)	Joey Ferrando	PTS	8	Dec 26, 1938	Madison Square Garden, New York City, New York	
133	Win	93–22–17 (1)	Pete DeGrasse	KO	5 (8)	Dec 5, 1938	Madison Square Garden, New York City, New York	
132	Win	92–22–17 (1)	Vince Dell'Orto	PTS	6	Nov 25, 1938	Madison Square Garden, New York City, New York	
131	Win	91–22–17 (1)	Cristobal Jaramillo	PTS	8	Nov 7, 1938	St. Nicholas Arena, New York City, New York	
130	Win	90–22–17 (1)	Al Reid	KO	4 (6)	Aug 17, 1938	Madison Square Garden, New York City, New York	
129	Loss	89–22–17 (1)	Henry Armstrong	KO	3 (10)	Feb 1, 1938	Olympic Auditorium, Los Angeles, California	
128	Win	89–21–17 (1)	Bus Breese	PTS	10	Nov 30, 1937	Olympic Auditorium, Los Angeles, California	
127	Win	88–21–17 (1)	Babe Santello	KO	1 (10)	Oct 19, 1937	Olympic Auditorium, Los Angeles, California	
126	Loss	87–21–17 (1)	Baby Arizmendi	PTS	10	Oct 5, 1937	Olympic Auditorium, Los Angeles, California	
125	Win	87–20–17 (1)	Georgie Hansford	PTS	10	Sep 7, 1937	Olympic Auditorium, Los Angeles, California	
124	Draw	86–20–17 (1)	Georgie Hansford	PTS	10	Aug 17, 1937	Olympic Auditorium, Los Angeles, California	
123	Win	86–20–16 (1)	Norbert Meehan	TKO	5 (6)	Jul 21, 1937	Auditorium, Oakland, California	
122	Win	85–20–16 (1)	Henry Mendola	KO	1 (10)	Jul 5, 1937	Stockton, California	
121	Win	84–20–16 (1)	Mike Martinez	TKO	3 (6)	Jun 9, 1937	Pasadena Arena, Pasadena, California	
120	Win	83–20–16 (1)	Sonny Valdez	PTS	4	May 18, 1937	Olympic Auditorium, Los Angeles, California	
119	Win	82–20–16 (1)	Kid Ray	PTS	6	Apr 14, 1937	Greenwich Coliseum, Tacoma, Washington	
118	Win	81–20–16 (1)	Jimmy McClain	KO	2 (?)	Jan 15, 1937	Bremerton A.C., Bremerton, Washington	
117	Win	80–20–16 (1)	Douglas Worth	TKO	1 (6)	Sep 29, 1936	Auditorium, Portland, Oregon	
116	Draw	79–20–16 (1)	Cecil Payne	PTS	6	Aug 20, 1936	Greenwich Coliseum, Tacoma, Washington	
115	Win	79–20–15 (1)	Eddie Spina	PTS	6	Jul 6, 1936	Multnomah Stadium, Portland, Oregon	
114	Win	78–20–15 (1)	Eddie Spina	PTS	6	May 21, 1936	Greenwich Coliseum, Tacoma, Washington	
113	Win	77–20–15 (1)	Willie Davies	TKO	7 (8)	Apr 28, 1936	Auditorium, Portland, Oregon	
112	Win	76–20–15 (1)	Elmer Brown	PTS	10	Apr 17, 1936	Fox Theater, Butte, Montana	
111	Win	75–20–15 (1)	Young Corpuz	PTS	10	Apr 10, 1936	Aberdeen, Washington	
110	Win	74–20–15 (1)	Claude Varner	PTS	10	Mar 25, 1936	Denman Auditorium, Vancouver, British Columbia, Canada	
109	Loss	73–20–15 (1)	Pablo Dano	KO	2 (10)	May 10, 1935	Civic Auditorium, Watsonville, California	
108	Win	73–19–15 (1)	Mark Diaz	TKO	4 (10)	Apr 6, 1935	L Street Arena, Sacramento, California	
107	Loss	72–19–15 (1)	Chico Cisneros	PTS	10	Feb 16, 1935	Arena Nacional, Mexico City, Distrito Federal, Mexico	
106	Loss	72–18–15 (1)	Baby Arizmendi	KO	4 (10)	Feb 2, 1935	Arena Nacional, Mexico City, Distrito Federal, Mexico	
105	Loss	72–17–15 (1)	Lew Monte	PTS	6	Nov 17, 1934	Ridgewood Grove, Brooklyn, New York City, New York	
104	Loss	72–16–15 (1)	Mose Butch	PTS	10	Oct 8, 1934	Duquesne Garden, Pittsburgh, Pennsylvania	
103	Win	72–15–15 (1)	Perfecto Lopez	PTS	6	Jun 29, 1934	Ventura A.C., Ventura, California	
102	Loss	71–15–15 (1)	Freddie Miller	PTS	8	Jun 8, 1934	El Centro A.C., El Centro, California	
101	Draw	71–14–15 (1)	Perfecto Lopez	PTS	6	May 29, 1934	Olympic Auditorium, Los Angeles, California	
100	Win	71–14–14 (1)	Frankie Venegas	KO	5 (10)	May 25, 1934	El Centro, California	
99	Win	70–14–14 (1)	Albert Ladou	PTS	4	May 1, 1934	Olympic Auditorium, Los Angeles, California	
98	Win	69–14–14 (1)	Jimmy Alvarado	TKO	3 (4)	Apr 17, 1934	Olympic Auditorium, Los Angeles, California	
97	Win	68–14–14 (1)	Augie Soliz	TKO	5 (6)	Feb 20, 1934	Crystal Pool, Seattle, Washington	
96	Win	67–14–14 (1)	Bobby Gray	PTS	6	Jan 30, 1934	Crystal Pool, Seattle, Washington	
95	Loss	66–14–14 (1)	Eddie Shea	KO	1 (10)	Oct 17, 1933	Olympic Auditorium, Los Angeles, California	For US–California State featherweight title
94	Draw	66–13–14 (1)	Allan Foston	PTS	8	Sep 19, 1933	Auditorium, Portland, Oregon	
93	Win	66–13–13 (1)	Willie Jubera	RTD	2 (6)	Sep 5, 1933	Olympic Auditorium, Los Angeles, California	
92	Win	65–13–13 (1)	Huerta Evans	TKO	4 (6)	Sep 1, 1933	Dreamland Auditorium, San Francisco, California	
91	Win	64–13–13 (1)	Whitey Neal	PTS	6	Aug 22, 1933	Multnomah Stadium, Portland, Oregon	
90	Win	63–13–13 (1)	Mickey Cohen	TKO	3 (8)	Apr 11, 1933	Olympic Auditorium, Los Angeles, California	
89	Win	62–13–13 (1)	Pedro Villanueva	PTS	6	Jan 6, 1933	Ventura A.C., Ventura, California	
88	Win	61–13–13 (1)	Benny Garcia	PTS	6	Dec 15, 1932	Ventura A.C., Ventura, California	
87	Win	60–13–13 (1)	Huerta Evans	PTS	10	Dec 7, 1932	Wilmington Bowl, Wilmington, California	
86	Win	59–13–13 (1)	Al Greenfield	PTS	4	Nov 22, 1932	Olympic Auditorium, Los Angeles, California	
85	Win	58–13–13 (1)	Baby Jack Dempsey	KO	2 (4)	Nov 15, 1932	Olympic Auditorium, Los Angeles, California	
84	Win	57–13–13 (1)	Johnny Ryan	TKO	2 (6)	Nov 9, 1932	Wilmington Bowl, Wilmington, California	
83	Win	56–13–13 (1)	Victor Kid Ponce	KO	1 (6)	Oct 19, 1932	Wilmington Bowl, Wilmington, California	
82	Win	55–13–13 (1)	Jesse Maxey	KO	1 (4)	Oct 11, 1932	Olympic Auditorium, Los Angeles, California	
81	Draw	54–13–13 (1)	Mose Bailey	PTS	6	Sep 2, 1932	Coliseum, San Diego, California	
80	Win	54–13–12 (1)	Johnny Minella	PTS	6	Aug 26, 1932	Coliseum, San Diego, California	
79	Win	53–13–12 (1)	Al Greenfield	PTS	4	Jul 12, 1932	Olympic Auditorium, Los Angeles, California	
78	Win	52–13–12 (1)	Huerta Evans	TKO	5 (6)	Jun 7, 1932	Olympic Auditorium, Los Angeles, California	
77	Win	51–13–12 (1)	Joe Pimentel	KO	2 (6)	May 18, 1932	Golden Gate Arena, San Francisco, California	
76	Win	50–13–12 (1)	Willie Davies	PTS	4	May 3, 1932	Olympic Auditorium, Los Angeles, California	
75	Win	49–13–12 (1)	Al Greenfield	PTS	6	Apr 29, 1932	Coliseum, San Diego, California	
74	Draw	48–13–12 (1)	Martin Zuniga	PTS	6	Feb 16, 1932	Olympic Auditorium, Los Angeles, California	
73	Win	48–13–11 (1)	Ray Montoya	PTS	6	Feb 5, 1932	Coliseum, San Diego, California	
72	Win	47–13–11 (1)	Tony Tassi	TKO	4 (6)	Jan 12, 1932	Olympic Auditorium, Los Angeles, California	
71	Win	46–13–11 (1)	Clem Avila	PTS	6	Nov 24, 1931	Olympic Auditorium, Los Angeles, California	
70	Draw	45–13–11 (1)	Huerta Evans	PTS	10	Oct 29, 1931	Orange Belt A.C., San Bernardino, California	
69	Win	45–13–10 (1)	Huerta Evans	PTS	8	Oct 8, 1931	Orange Belt A.C., San Bernardino, California	
68	Win	44–13–10 (1)	Mike Cordova	PTS	6	Sep 15, 1931	Olympic Auditorium, Los Angeles, California	
67	Win	43–13–10 (1)	Baby Jack Dempsey	KO	2 (4)	Aug 11, 1931	Olympic Auditorium, Los Angeles, California	
66	Draw	42–13–10 (1)	Martin Zuniga	PTS	6	Aug 6, 1931	Memorial Auditorium, Sacramento, California	
65	Win	42–13–9 (1)	Adam Moraga	TKO	3 (4)	Jul 29, 1931	Wilmington Bowl, Wilmington, California	
64	Loss	41–13–9 (1)	Martin Zuniga	PTS	6	Jul 4, 1931	Ventura A.C., Ventura, California	
63	Win	41–12–9 (1)	Rod Alcantera	KO	1 (6)	Jun 12, 1931	Ventura A.C., Ventura, California	
62	Win	40–12–9 (1)	Claude Roberts	PTS	6	May 1, 1931	Coliseum, San Diego, California	
61	NC	39–12–9 (1)	Frank Abendino	NC	2 (6)	Apr 27, 1931	Bakersfield Arena, Bakersfield, California	Referee declared a "no-contest" as Wright had a decided edge over his foe
60	Win	39–12–9	Ricky Hall	PTS	6	Apr 24, 1931	Pismo Beach Arena, Pismo Beach, California	
59	Win	38–12–9	Mike Cordova	PTS	8	Apr 7, 1931	Memorial Auditorium, Sacramento, California	
58	Win	37–12–9	Mike Cordova	PTS	4	Mar 31, 1931	Olympic Auditorium, Los Angeles, California	
57	Win	36–12–9	Ernie Chacon	PTS	4	Mar 10, 1931	Olympic Auditorium, Los Angeles, California	
56	Win	35–12–9	Sailor Ray Butler	PTS	10	Feb 13, 1931	Coliseum, San Diego, California	
55	Win	34–12–9	Bobby Guinn	TKO	2 (6)	Jan 28, 1931	Wilmington Bowl, Wilmington, California	
54	Loss	33–12–9	Huerta Evans	PTS	6	Jan 13, 1931	Olympic Auditorium, Los Angeles, California	
53	Loss	33–11–9	Ray Montoya	PTS	10	Dec 12, 1930	Coliseum, San Diego, California	
52	Win	33–10–9	Ray Cervantes	PTS	6	Nov 18, 1930	Olympic Auditorium, Los Angeles, California	
51	Win	32–10–9	Jerry Duffy	PTS	6	Nov 14, 1930	Coliseum, San Diego, California	
50	Win	31–10–9	Johnny Lee	KO	3 (6)	Nov 7, 1930	Coliseum, San Diego, California	
49	Draw	30–10–9	Mose Bailey	PTS	6	Oct 24, 1930	Coliseum, San Diego, California	
48	Win	30–10–8	Marion Cano	KO	4 (4)	Oct 21, 1930	Olympic Auditorium, Los Angeles, California	
47	Win	29–10–8	Kid Avelino	PTS	6	Oct 7, 1930	Olympic Auditorium, Los Angeles, California	
46	Win	28–10–8	Manuel Trevino	KO	1 (4)	Sep 16, 1930	Olympic Auditorium, Los Angeles, California	
45	Win	27–10–8	Sid Torres	PTS	6	Aug 12, 1930	Olympic Auditorium, Los Angeles, California	
44	Draw	26–10–8	Sammy Seaman	PTS	6	Jul 21, 1930	Olympic Auditorium, Los Angeles, California	
43	Win	26–10–7	Carlos Chipres	KO	2 (4)	Jul 10, 1930	Pasadena Arena, Pasadena, California	
42	Loss	25–10–7	Frisco Lenda	PTS	4	Jul 5, 1930	El Centro, California	
41	Win	25–9–7	Ramon Navarro	TKO	5 (6)	Jun 26, 1930	Pasadena Arena, Pasadena, California	
40	Win	24–9–7	Frisco Lenda	PTS	6	Jun 17, 1930	Orange Belt A.C., San Bernardino, California	
39	Win	23–9–7	Jimmy Mack	PTS	6	Jun 12, 1930	Pasadena Arena, Pasadena, California	
38	Win	22–9–7	Clayton Gouyd	PTS	8	May 8, 1930	Pasadena Arena, Pasadena, California	
37	Loss	21–9–7	Canto Robledo	PTS	8	Apr 24, 1930	Pasadena Arena, Pasadena, California	
36	Win	21–8–7	Danny Arnuf	TKO	1 (4)	Jan 30, 1930	Orange Belt A.C., San Bernardino, California	
35	Loss	20–8–7	Luis Echeveste	PTS	4	Dec 3, 1929	Orange County A.C., Santa Ana, California	
34	Win	20–7–7	Jess Vasquez	PTS	6	Nov 27, 1929	Orange Belt A.C., San Bernardino, California	
33	Win	19–7–7	Harry Barrere	PTS	6	Oct 24, 1929	Orange Belt A.C., San Bernardino, California	
32	Win	18–7–7	Harry Purdue	PTS	4	Oct 10, 1929	Orange Belt A.C., San Bernardino, California	
31	Draw	17–7–7	Tony Moreno	PTS	4	Oct 2, 1929	Ontario A.C., Ontario, California	
30	Win	17–7–6	Pal Shoaf	PTS	4	Sep 12, 1929	Orange Belt A.C., San Bernardino, California	
29	Loss	16–7–6	Louie Medina	PTS	4	Sep 10, 1929	Orange County A.C., Santa Ana, California	
28	Win	16–6–6	Pastor Calope	PTS	4	Sep 4, 1929	Ontario A.C., Ontario, California	
27	Win	15–6–6	Ray Vilalobos	KO	5 (6)	Aug 29, 1929	Orange Belt A.C., San Bernardino, California	
26	Loss	14–6–6	Clem Avila	PTS	4	Aug 21, 1929	Ontario A.C., Ontario, California	
25	Loss	14–5–6	Frisco Lenda	PTS	4	Jul 5, 1929	El Centro, California	
24	Draw	14–4–6	Ray Vilalobos	PTS	6	May 2, 1929	Orange Belt A.C., San Bernardino, California	
23	Win	14–4–5	Johnny Mason	PTS	6	Apr 18, 1929	Orange Belt A.C., San Bernardino, California	
22	Draw	13–4–5	Henry Wallender	PTS	4	Apr 9, 1929	Olympic Auditorium, Los Angeles, California	
21	Win	13–4–4	Johnny Gabucco	PTS	4	Apr 2, 1929	Orange County A.C., Santa Ana, California	
20	Win	12–4–4	Paul Hardy	KO	3 (4)	Mar 28, 1929	Pasadena Arena, Pasadena, California	
19	Win	11–4–4	Tony Apodaca	PTS	4	Mar 14, 1929	Pasadena Arena, Pasadena, California	
18	Loss	10–4–4	Joe Velardi	PTS	6	Feb 7, 1929	Orange Belt A.C., San Bernardino, California	
17	Draw	10–3–4	Frisco Lenda	PTS	6	Jan 24, 1929	Pasadena Arena, Pasadena, California	
16	Win	10–3–3	Pastor Calope	TKO	2 (6)	Jan 17, 1929	Orange Belt A.C., San Bernardino, California	
15	Win	9–3–3	Ray Davis	PTS	6	Dec 20, 1928	Orange Belt A.C., San Bernardino, California	
14	Draw	8–3–3	Louie Contreras	PTS	6	Dec 13, 1928	Orange Belt A.C., San Bernardino, California	
13	Win	8–3–2	Ray Davis	PTS	4	Nov 22, 1928	Orange Belt A.C., San Bernardino, California	
12	Win	7–3–2	Jimmy Martinez	TKO	1 (4)	Oct 3, 1928	Ocean Park Arena, Santa Monica, California	
11	Draw	6–3–2	Joe Hernandez	PTS	4	Sep 13, 1928	Orange Belt A.C., San Bernardino, California	
10	Loss	6–3–1	Joe Hernandez	PTS	4	Aug 23, 1928	Orange Belt A.C., San Bernardino, California	
9	Loss	6–2–1	Ray Davis	PTS	4	Jul 26, 1928	Orange Belt A.C., San Bernardino, California	
8	Draw	6–1–1	Valentino Castellanos	PTS	4	Jul 12, 1928	Orange Belt A.C., San Bernardino, California	
7	Win	6–1	June Lagera	PTS	4	Jun 20, 1928	Wilmington Bowl, Wilmington, California	
6	Win	5–1	Victor Acosta	KO	2 (4)	May 31, 1928	Orange Belt A.C., San Bernardino, California	
5	Win	4–1	Tommy Sanchez	PTS	4	May 24, 1928	Pasadena Arena, Pasadena, California	
4	Win	3–1	Valemo Martin	PTS	4	May 3, 1928	Orange Belt A.C., San Bernardino, California	
3	Win	2–1	Nilo Balles	KO	3 (4)	Apr 12, 1928	Orange Belt A.C., San Bernardino, California	
2	Loss	1–1	Jodie Greyson	PTS	4	Mar 1, 1928	Orange Belt A.C., San Bernardino, California	
1	Win	1–0	Nilo Balles	PTS	4	Feb 23, 1928	Orange Belt A.C., San Bernardino, California	

== See also ==
- Lineal championship

Achievements
Preceded by Joey Archibald	World Featherweight Champion; September 11, 1941 – November 20, 1942	Succeeded by Willie Pep
