= Leo Rodak =

American boxer

Personal information
- Nickname: The Chicago Flash
- Nationality: American
- Born: Leo Rodak; June 5, 1913 Chicago, Illinois
- Died: April 13, 1991 (aged 77)
- Weight: Featherweight

Boxing career
- Stance: Orthodox

Boxing record
- Total fights: 115
- Wins: 78
- Win by KO: 6
- Losses: 26
- Draws: 11
- No contests: 0

Leo Rodak (June 5, 1913 – April 13, 1991) was an American featherweight boxer from Chicago. He took the Maryland version of the World Featherweight Title from Jackie Wilson on June 17, 1938, in a fifteen-round unanimous decision at Carlin Park in Baltimore, Maryland.

He was declared the National Boxing Association (NBA) World Featherweight Champion when he defeated Leone Efrati at Chicago's Coliseum in a ten-round unanimous decision, on December 29, 1938, though some sources omit him as the NBA champion, as he held the title only four months.

== Early life and amateur career ==
Rodak was born on June 5, 1913, in South Chicago to an athletic Ukrainian family. His brother Mike was a bicycling champion. Remaining in South Chicago through his youth, at 17 he joined Chicago's Catholic Youth Organization (CYO), where he received boxing training. According to one source, Rodak's amateur record over a two-year period was a remarkable 157–5.

=== Golden Gloves tournament wins, 1931-33 ===
As an amateur from 1931 to 1933 Rodak showcased his exceptional boxing talent in five Chicago Golden Gloves tournaments. He first won the 1931 Flyweight 112 lb championships for both the Chicago and Intercity Golden Gloves Championships. In 1932, he took the Bantamweight 118 lb Chicago Golden Gloves Tournament of Champions, and in 1933, the Featherweight 126 lb Chicago Golden Gloves Tournament of Champions and the Intercity Golden Gloves Championships.

=== Early career highlights ===
Rodak was known for speedy hands and feet, but not for a knockout punch. In his second year as a professional in 1934, and at only twenty-one years of age, he defeated Eddie Shea, Everett "Young" Rightmire, and former 1932 NBA world featherweight champion Tommy Paul. According to the Chicago Tribune, he won every round of ten against Eddie Shea on April 23, 1934, at White City Arena in Chicago, effectively using his left.

On September 20, 1934, he decisively defeated Everett "Young" Rightmire at Wrigley Field in Chicago in a ten-round points decision, acting as the aggressor throughout the fight, and flooring Rightmire in the first round. Rodak had Rightmire close to a knockout in the sixth round. One source attributed Rightmire's loss to his lack of a knockout punch. Rodak would later lose to Rightmire on March 16, 1939, in St. Louis, in a ten-round points decision.

On October 15, 1934, he defeated former world featherweight champion Tommy Paul in a non-title ten round points decision at White City Arena in Chicago. Scoring on the close bout was near even going into the ninth round, when Rodak briefly sent Paul into the ropes, but he did not fully achieve his winning points margin in the tenth, when he put Paul down for a two count. The win was his twentieth in a row.

==== Loss to Tony Canzoneri, January, 1935 ====
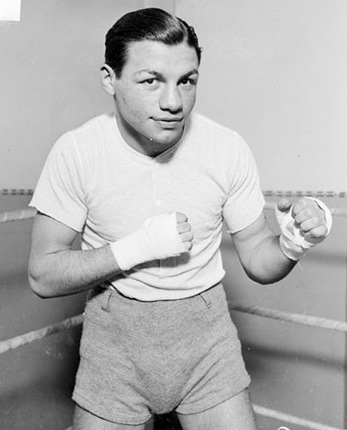
Ex-champion Tony Canzoneri

Most impressively, Rodak was undefeated in his first 22 fights. His streak ended on January 31, 1935, when he lost to the incomparable one-time featherweight, lightweight, and junior welterweight champion Tony Canzoneri at Chicago Stadium in a ten-round Unanimous Decision. Demonstrating the respect paid Canzoneri, the bout brought 14,775 fans, the largest crowd of the year. As expected, Canzoneri dominated the talented youngster, rocking him on his heels from a blow to the jaw in the sixth, and inflicting stiff punishment in the seventh. Rodak hung on well, showing good defense and excellent conditioning against the former champion. Canzoneri took seven rounds decisively, had a small edge in two, and lost only one.

On February 7, 1936, Rodak fought Bushy Graham to a draw in Madison Square Garden. Graham used smart foot work, lightning fast ducking, and superb slipping and counter-punching. The veteran Graham leaned forward coaxing Rodak to throw punches, and then repeatedly drew back and dodged them. Showing his command, he stung Rodak's face with jabs and overhand swings. In the seventh, Rodak was dropped by a blow from Graham who had remained illusive despite Rodak's attacks. Despite a three-year layoff and his advanced age of 32, Graham gave an excellent display of talent to the younger Golden Glove winner. Though the final ruling was a draw, Graham demonstrated he still had championship form.

== Taking the Maryland version of World Featherweight Title, June 1938 ==
Rodak fought Jackie Wilson four times. The first three fights were ruled a draw by the referee. The fourth fight, in Baltimore, Maryland, was for the Maryland version of the World Featherweight Title. Rodak won in a fifteen-round unanimous decision at Carlin Park on June 17, 1938, before a small crowd of 3,000. Each fighter split the first eight rounds on points, while the crowd and celebrity referee Jack Dempsey impatiently urged a faster pace. Rodak opened up in the remaining seven rounds, until Wilson became noticeably groggy in the final three. The crowd cheered for Rodak in the last half of the bout, disapproving of the ducking of Wilson. In the fifteenth and final round, the contestants butted heads, leaving a cut on the top of Rodak's head. The title had been vacated by Henry Armstrong after he failed to defend his title within the established six-month period.

Rodak fought Louisville boxer Sammy Angott, 1940-44 NBA lightweight champion, three times in a row in 1938. Both boxers fought in the Featherweight range. Angott won the first fight, at Pittsburgh's Forbes Field, in a ten-round split decision on July 25, 1938. Though Rodak was floored during Angott's comeback in the ninth round, he hung on, having taken all the earlier rounds through the eighth. Only one judge scored for Angott, causing the split decision. The second fight he lost by a first-round technical knockout in Millvale, Pennsylvania. Rodak was down for a count of nine, and then floored three more times before the fight was called after 2:39 in the first round by the referee. The third fight was lost by ten-round decision at Motor Square Garden in Pittsburgh on September 27, 1938. Angott started slowly but found more telling blows in the final round.

=== First defense of Maryland World Featherweight Title, October, 1938 ===
On October 24, 1938, he defeated Freddie Miller, former NBA World Featherweight Champion, for his first defense of the Maryland version of the World Featherweight Title in a fifteen-round points decision in Washington, D.C. Rodak broke away in the closing rounds to gain his lead on points scoring, landing blows with both his left and right to the face and body of Miller.

== Declared NBA World Featherweight Champion after beating Leone Efrati, December, 1938 ==
In a vastly important, but lesser known victory on December 29, 1938, Rodak was declared NBA world featherweight champion when he defeated Italian national Leone Efrati before a crowd of 5000 at Chicago's Coliseum in a considerably close, but unanimous ten round points decision, disputed by Efrati's handlers and many of the spectators present who booed the final ruling. Rodak rallied after a slow start and increased his points margin swiftly in the final three rounds. Efrati won the second and third rounds, and looked to take the fourth when Rodak briefly floored him with a solid punch. Efrati scored enough points to take the lead in the fifth, sixth, and seventh, before Rodak overtook the point's count in the last three rounds.

== Losing the NBA, NYSAC, World Featherweight Title against Joey Archibald, April, 1939 ==
Rodak lost his shot at the sustained and universal recognition offered by the NBA world featherweight championship when he lost to Joey Archibald before a crowd of 5,500 on April 18, 1939, in a fifteen-round points decision at Rhode Island Auditorium in Providence. Rodak was considered the top contender for the full New York version of the NYSAC world featherweight title. Archibald was the aggressor throughout the bout, and landed the most punches in the opinion of the referee who scored for him. The Associated Press gave seven rounds to Archibald, with six for Rodak and two even. Both fighters committed fouls in the eleventh, a round declared even by the referee as was the closely fought seventh. In the thirteenth and fourteenth, with the bout close but Archibald leading by a shade, Rodak broke loose and gained the advantage with long and wary rights. The fifteenth clearly went to Archibald. After the fight, Rodak's manager complained of frequent low blows by Archibald.

Rodak fought Jackie Wilson a fifth and sixth time. He won the fifth by a decision in Chicago, and the sixth as a lightweight by a close ten round points decision in Toledo, Ohio on October 27, 1941.

Fighting at the bottom of the lightweight range, Rodak won a close eight round points decision before a crowd of 4,500 on December 3, 1940, against Maxie Shapiro at Broadway Arena in Brooklyn. He lost a rematch with Shapiro on August 14, 1941, at Ebbets Field in a ten-round decision, where he was down in the final moments of the ninth for a count of nine.

On October 14, 1941, Rodak lost to skilled black boxer Chalky Wright, reigning NYSAC, and Maryland World Featherweight title holder, in a non-title "listless ten round points decision at Uline, Arena in Washington. The crowd of 4,000 booed as the boxers spent excessive time in clinches. Wright dominated from the second round, after tagging Rodak with an uppercut. His opponents second round dominance caused Rodak to back away from Wright for the remaining rounds, when not clinching to avoid a blow.

=== Service in the Marines and losses to Tippy Larkin, Willie Joyce, and Henry Armstrong, 1942 ===
Rodak went on to fight Tippy Larkin, losing by a decision at Meadowbrook Bowl in Newark, New Jersey, on June 3, 1942. Rodak did well through the first five rounds, but faded in the sixth and seventh when he received a flurry of lefts and right to the head, though he subsequently covered well and came through the next three rounds. The referee gave six rounds to Larkin, with three to Rodak, and one even.

During WWII, Rodak joined the Marines, and continued to fight professionally. He lost to Henry Armstrong on September 14, 1942, at the Civic Auditorium in San Francisco in an eighth-round TKO. Rodak was floored in both the second and third rounds for counts of nine by rights from Armstrong. Armstrong won six of the eight rounds, and the TKO when the fight was stopped in the eighth due to a deep cut over the left eye of Rodak. Rodak had a slight margin in the first and fourth.

Rodak fought Willie Joyce twice. The first fight Rodak lost by an eighth round technical knock on December 14, 1942, in Detroit, Michigan. The referee had to stop the fight in the fourth as Joyce had reopened the cut Rodak had received fighting Henry Armstrong two months earlier. The second fight Rodak won by decision on March 3, 1944, in Hollywood, California. He was still serving in the Marines at the time. Rodak kept Joyce off balance throughout the bout with straight lefts, and finished strongly in the ninth and tenth, though he was ten years younger than his opponent, who had twice suffered a broken jaw at the hands of Henry Armstrong the prior year.

On February 15, 1946, Rodak lost to Bob Montgomery, reigning NYSAC lightweight champion, in a non-title ten round split decision at Chicago Stadium before a crowd of 8,575. Both boxers fought as lightweights. The crowd was disappointed with the amount of clinching and lack of solid punching displayed by the two distinguished but aging lightweights. Montgomery, at 27, had lost training from his recent three year hitch in the Army, and Rodak, at thirty-two was well past his boxing prime. Rodak had recently ended his service with the Marines. Though Rodak had not fought for thirteen months, to his credit, he showed stamina in the seventh, eighth, and ninth and was scored higher by one of the three judges.

== Life after boxing ==
Rodak retired in November, 1946, after losing to John Thomas in a fifth-round knockout in Los Angeles. He went to work for the Cook County Forestry Department and sidelined as a boxing trainer. He died at 77 on April 13, 1991.

== Primary boxing achievements ==
Achievements
Preceded by Joey Archibald	NBA World Featherweight Champion; Dec 29, 1938, Declared NBA Champion – Lost on April 18, 1939	Succeeded by Joey Archibald
Preceded by Jackie Wilson	Maryland version (NYSAC) World Featherweight Champion; June 17, 1938, Declared Maryland Champion– Lost on April 18, 1939	Succeeded by Joey Archibald
