= Jackie Callura =

Canadian boxer

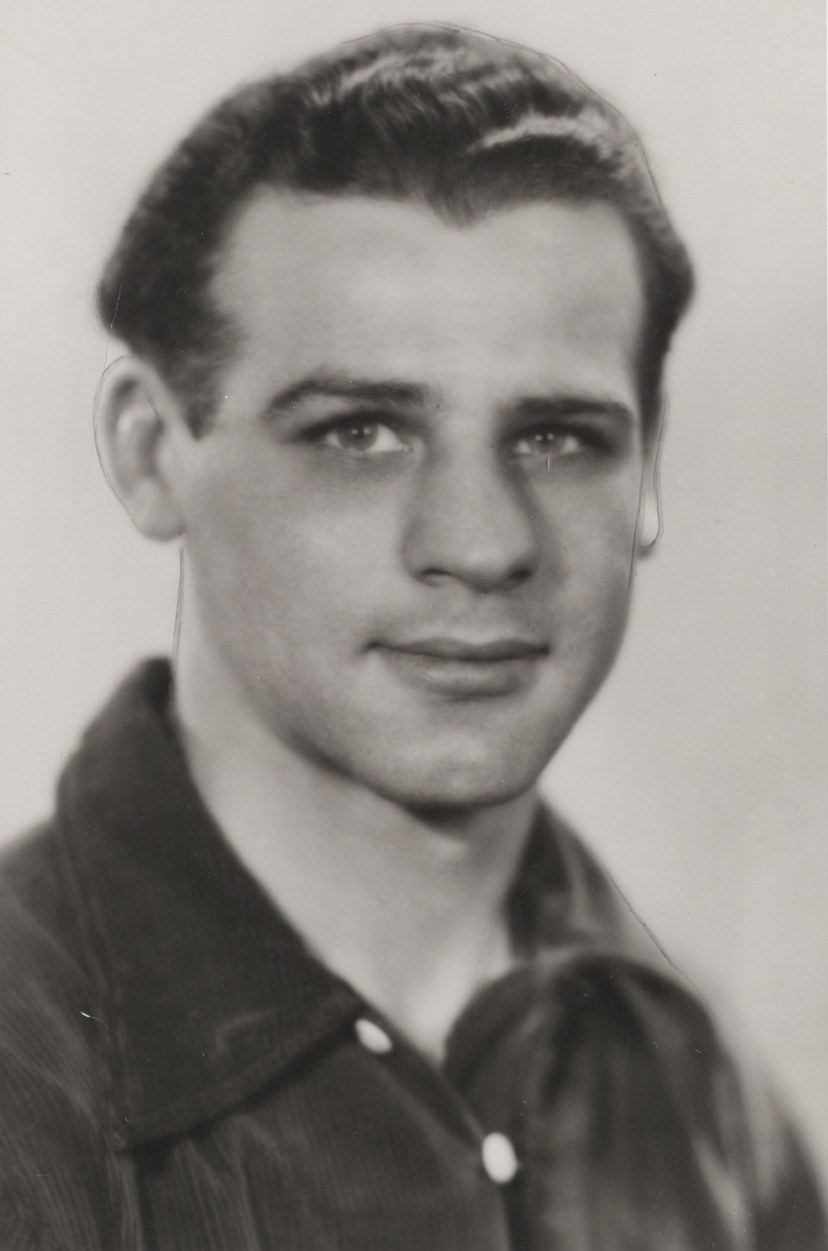
- Born: John Callura; September 14, 1917; Hamilton, Ontario, Canada
- Died: November 4, 1993 (aged 76); Hamilton, Ontario, Canada
- Occupation: featherweight boxer

John Callura (September 14, 1917 – November 4, 1993) was a Canadian featherweight boxer.

He was born and died in Hamilton, Ontario.

Callura won the national featherweight title in 1931 and was a member of the 1932 Summer Olympics team.

In 1932 he was eliminated in the first round of the Olympic flyweight competition after losing his fight to the eventual bronze medalist Louis Salica.

He turned professional in 1936 and became the world featherweight champion by defeating Jackie Wilson in 1943. He defended his title twice until losing to Phil Terranova.

In 1969, he was inducted into Canada's Sports Hall of Fame.

== 1932 Olympic record ==
Below is the record of Jackie Callura, a Canadian flyweight boxer who competed at the 1932 Los Angeles Olympics:

- Round of 16: lost to Louis Salica (United States) by decision
