= Jackie Wilson (boxer) =

American boxer (1909-1966)

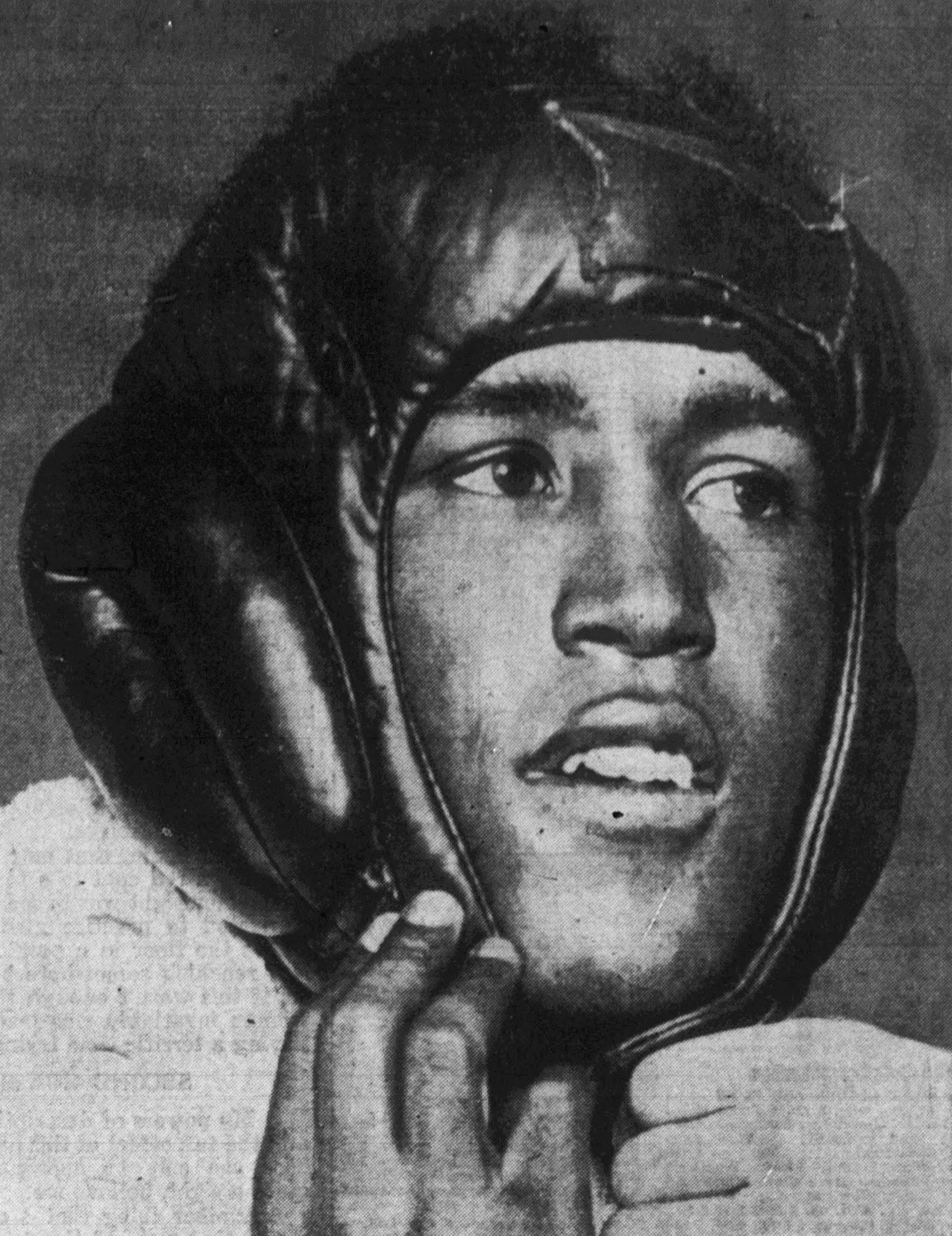
- Wilson, circa 1941

Personal information
- Nationality: American
- Born: Jack Benjamin Wilson; January 1, 1909 Westminster, South Carolina, U.S.
- Died: December 2, 1966 (aged 57)
- Weight: Featherweight

Boxing career
- Stance: Orthodox

Boxing record
- Total fights: 155
- Wins: 101
- Win by KO: 20
- Losses: 45
- Draws: 8
- No contests: 1

Jackie Wilson (January 1, 1909 – December 2, 1966) was an American boxer and the NBA World Featherweight Champion. He was born in South Carolina but raised in Leechburg, PA and listed from Pittsburgh. He was undefeated in his first 6 fights with a record of 4-0-2.

Wilson fought Tommy Paul twice. Wilson won both times in Pennsylvania by decision in the first fight and by TKO in the second fight. He fought Sammy Angott and won by decision in Pennsylvania. He also fought Freddie Miller two times. The first fight Wilson won by decision in Motor Square Garden. The second fight he won by decision in Cincinnati. He fought Speedy Dado in California and won by decision. He fought Sammy Angott in Milwaukee, Wisconsin and lost by decision.

Wilson fought Leo Rodak four times. The first three fights went to a draw. The fourth fight was for the World Featherweight Title the Maryland State Version. Rodak won by decision in Baltimore, Maryland. Wilson fought Rodak for a fifth and sixth time. Rodak won the fifth fight by decision in Chicago. The sixth fight Rodak again won by decision in Ohio.

Wilson fought David Kui Kong Young two straight times. The first fight Wilson won by DQ in Australia. The second fight he won by decision in Australia. He fought Maxie Shapiro in Baltimore, Maryland and won by decision. He fought Willie Joyce in Washington, D.C., and lost by TKO.

He fought Richie Lemos for the National Boxing Association World featherweight title and won by decision in Los Angeles, California. In a rematch for the belt, Wilson beat Lemos again by decision in Los Angeles, California. Wilson also fought the great Willie Pep. Pep won by decision in Pittsburgh, Pennsylvania.

| Preceded by Richie Lemos | NBA World Featherweight Champion; 1941 Nov 18 – 1943 Jan 18 | Succeeded by Phil Terranova |
