= Willie Pep =

American boxer (1922–2006)

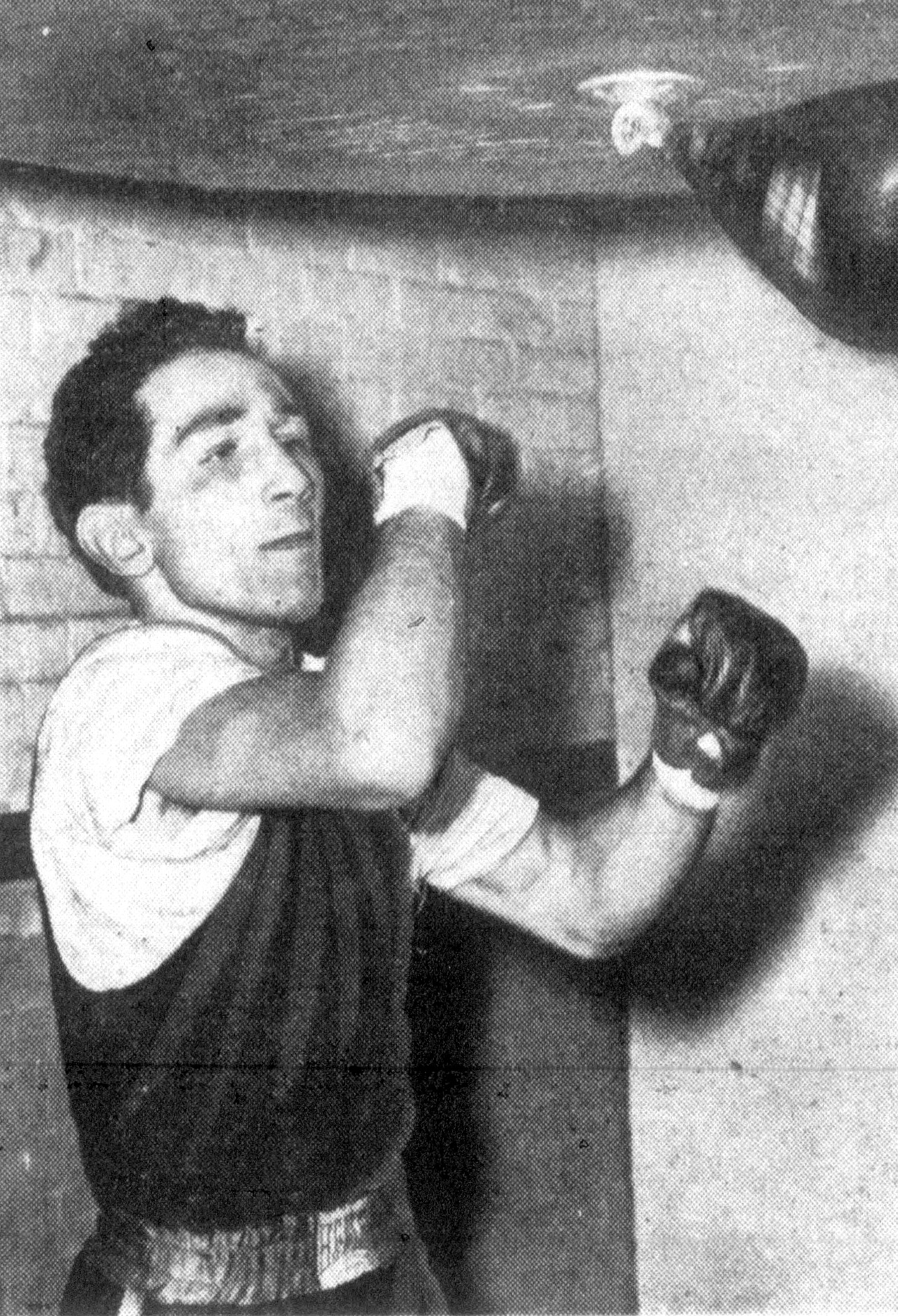
- Pep, c. 1950

Personal information
- Nickname: Will o' the Wisp
- Born: Guglielmo Papaleo; September 19, 1922 Middletown, Connecticut, U.S.
- Died: November 23, 2006 (aged 84) Rocky Hill, Connecticut, U.S.
- Height: 5 ft 5 in (165 cm)
- Weight: Featherweight

Boxing career
- Reach: 68 in (173 cm)
- Stance: Orthodox

Boxing record
- Total fights: 241
- Wins: 229
- Win by KO: 65
- Losses: 11
- Draws: 1

Guglielmo Papaleo (September 19, 1922 – November 23, 2006), better known as Willie Pep, was an American professional boxer who held the World Featherweight Championship twice between the years of 1942 and 1950. Known for his speed, finesse, and elusiveness, Pep is widely considered one of the greatest defensive boxers of all time. He was voted as the No. 1 featherweight of the 20th century by the Associated Press and ranked the No. 1 featherweight of all time by the International Boxing Research Organization in 2005. He is also currently ranked by BoxRec as the greatest featherweight boxer of all time.

He boxed a total of 1,956 rounds in the 241 bouts during his 26-year career, a considerable number of rounds and bouts even for a fighter of his era. His final record was 229–11–1 with 65 knockouts; after his 199th win, opponent Kid Campeche described his experience by saying, "Fighting Willie Pep is like trying to stomp out a grass fire." Pep was inducted into the International Boxing Hall of Fame in 1990.

== Early life ==
Pep was born Guglielmo Papaleo in Middletown, Connecticut, to an Italian family: his father, Salvatore, was from Rosolini, Sicily, and his mother, Maria Marchese, was from nearby Melilli, Sicily.

== Boxing career ==
=== Amateur career ===
Pep first fought as an amateur in 1937. At the time, amateur boxers from Connecticut were allowed to fight for money. It was during the Great Depression and Pep's father was earning $15 per week at the Works Progress Administration. Pep worked as a shoeshine boy in downtown Hartford alongside Johnny Duke. Both boys joined a gym together and became sparring partners. Willie was soon earning more in one night of fighting each week. When his parents found out he was boxing, his mother was worried for him, but his father said that if he was making so much fighting on Fridays, maybe he should see about fighting on Tuesdays as well. "My old man, he was a sports fan" Pep later quipped.

In 1938 Pep fought Sugar Ray Robinson in the attic of a feed store in Norwich, Connecticut. According to Pep's later telling, Robinson was an amateur champion in the state of New York, where amateurs were not paid, so he took a pseudonym to get bouts for money in Connecticut. Because of this, Pep did not know who he was fighting at the time. Before the fight he was told his unknown opponent was not good, but he recalls quickly learning otherwise once the bout began and Robinson was "all over me".

=== Professional career ===
Pep started boxing professionally on July 10, 1940, beating James McGovern by a decision in four rounds in Hartford, Connecticut. Like many boxers of the first half of the 20th century, Pep concentrated his early fighting career on boxing in New England, and he split his first 25 contests between Connecticut and Massachusetts. He was undefeated during that span and for fight number 26, he finally headed west, beating Eddie Flores by a knockout in the first round at Thompsonville, Michigan. A couple of fights later, he travelled further west and made his California debut, beating Billy Spencer by a decision in four rounds at Los Angeles.

By the time Pep stepped up his quality of opposition he was undefeated at 41–0, and he met former world champion Joey Archibald in 1942. He beat Archibald by a decision in ten rounds and, in his next bout, challenged Abe Denner for the New England-area featherweight title. He won the fight by a decision in 12, and his status among the world's top featherweights continued to climb. He won ten more bouts to reach 52–0, including a rematch win over Archibald, before he was given his first world championship try, in October. He became the World Featherweight Champion by outpointing the defending world champ Chalky Wright over the 15 round distance. He fought twice more to finish the year, winning both by knockout.

Pep began 1943 by winning six bouts in a row to find himself with a record of 62–0. But in his seventh bout of 1943, he suffered his first defeat, at the hands of Sammy Angott, another world champion boxer. Angott beat Pep over the ten round distance, by decision. Ten days later, Pep was back in the ring, beating Bobby McIntyre by a decision. He closed 1943 winning five fights in a row, including two over future world champion Sal Bartolo and one over Jackie Wilson. The second win over Bartolo was in a defense of the world title.

1944 was a very good year for Pep. He won all 16 of his bouts that year, including wins over bantamweight champions Willie Joyce and Manuel Ortiz. He fought and beat Wright two more times, with Pep's featherweight title on the line once. He also made his first fight abroad, beating fringe contender Jackie Lemus in Canada.

On June 6, 1944, he fought near featherweight contender, and rated lightweight Julie Kogon before a record crowd of 7,751 in an extraordinary bout in Hartford, Connecticut, and won soundly in an eight-round decision. Pep was given eight rounds by one of the judges. One fascinating fact about this fight that is not well known, is that Kogon was threatened before the fight by two armed men. They stated that Kogon would not win the fight and it would be thrown or else him and his family would not survive.

He had eight fights in 1945, winning seven and drawing one. He beat former world champion Phil Terranova to retain the title, and had a ten-round draw with Jimmy McAllister.

In 1946, Pep had 18 fights, and won all of them, including a 12-round knockout of Bartolo and a three-round knockout of Wright. He had a six-fight knockout win streak during a span that year.

Despite being severely injured in a plane crash on January 5, Pep fought 10 bouts in 1947, again going undefeated. Many thought he had lost something as a fighter, especially after unexpectedly struggling in fights against Archie Wilmer (Pep won a majority decision) and Pedro Biesca (Pep was floored in the fourth round). He defended the world featherweight belt once that year, knocking out Jock Leslie in twelve rounds at Flint, Michigan.

Nineteen forty-eight was a year that would become important in Pep's life: He won 15 bouts before going into what would be the first fight of his four-fight series with Sandy Saddler. He retained the title by beating Humberto Sierra by a knockout in 10 and he beat former world champion Paddy DeMarco, also in ten, but by decision. Then, on October 29, he lost the world featherweight title to Saddler in a fourth-round knockout.

After two wins, he and Saddler met in 1949. On their rivalry's second installment, Pep recovered the World Featherweight Championship by beating Saddler in a 15-round decision, and then he engaged in a series of exhibition and ten round bouts before defending the crown against Eddie Campo, winning by a knockout in the seventh. He finished that year beating former bantamweight champion Harold Dade by a decision in ten at St. Louis.

In 1950, he won nine fights before meeting Saddler for a third time. Those nine bouts included defenses against Charlie Riley, knocked out in five, and France's Ray Famechon, beaten by decision in 15. Then came the third fight with Saddler. Pep once again lost his World Featherweight Championship to Saddler, being unable to come out for the eighth round due to a separated shoulder suffered at the end of the seventh round. Pep was ahead on all scorecards (5–2, 5–2, 4–2).

Nineteen fifty-one brought a hint of controversy to Pep's life. He won eight bouts in a row to start the year, but his ninth bout, the last chapter of the rivalry with Saddler, was his most important bout that year. Pep quit because blood from his right eye was bothering him. According to Nat Fleischer in The Ring, December 1951, this was an extremely dirty fight, with "wrestling, heeling, eye gouging, tripping, thumbing- in fact every dirty trick known to the old timers..." Referee Ray Miller "let the bout get out of hand..." "The pattern of the 'contest' never varied. Pep wouldn't make a fight of it and Sandy couldn't. Pep too frequently backed around the ring and Saddler just as often missed as he kept boring in trying to corner his man. Then when he did, the rowdy tactics got under way and ended only when either both were sprawled on the canvas still wrestling each other, or the referee was outside the ring trying pull the boys apart or both fighters and official were entangled in a pretzel formation on the ring floor." Pep was ahead on the scorecards of the officials after eight rounds, but he quit after nine rounds, "declaring he no longer could continue because of severe pains caused by a deep cut over the right eye."

In 1952, Pep had 12 fights, winning 11. He was knocked out in six by Tommy Collins, but also held two wins over Billy Lima that year.

Pep won all 11 fights in 1953, and entered 1954 on a 17-fight winning streak. After beating David Seabrooke by a decision, he lost to fringe contender Lulu Perez by TKO after a delayed reaction to a punch. Pep ended up winning three more bouts before the end of the year.

Pep went on boxing for five more years, retiring in 1960, and then he came back in 1964 and boxed for two more years. During that last period of his boxing career, he won 43 bouts and lost only five, but his only opponent of note during that time was Hogan Kid Bassey, a future World Featherweight Champion who knocked Pep out in nine rounds. Pep boxed in Caracas, Venezuela, losing to Sonny Leon by a decision in 10, and in his last fight, in 1966, he lost to Calvin Woodland by a decision in six.

Pep had a record of 229 wins, 11 losses and one draw, with 65 wins by knockout.

== Boxing style ==
Willie Pep was renowned for his elusive, near-untouchable style. His fighting approach was built on impeccable reflexes, lightning-fast footwork, and an uncanny ability to evade punches with minimal effort. Unlike traditional fighters, who relied on blocking or trading blows, Pep used lateral movement, subtle upper-body slips shoulder rolls, and precise pivots to make opponents miss entirely. His footwork allowed him to circle the ring effortlessly, frustrating aggressors by staying just out of reach. This allowed him to counter with sharp, accurate strikes when openings appeared.

By constantly evading punches, he drained opponents’ confidence and energy, forcing them into mistakes. His lack of knockout power was offset by his ability to outscore foes with rapid, precise combinations after dodging their attacks. Though his career spanned over two decades, his reliance on defense over brawling kept him remarkably fresh, cementing his legacy as one of the sport's purest boxers. Fighters like Floyd Mayweather Jr. later emulated elements of his elusive, cerebral approach.

== Post-career ==
After retiring, he and Saddler were involved in a series of exhibition bouts, and in 1980, Pep sued Sports Illustrated for running a story suggesting that he threw his fight with Perez. Pep lost the lawsuit, the jury deliberating just 15 minutes.

Pep remained active in boxing after hanging up the gloves, serving as an inspector and referee.

In 1977, Pep was elected to the National Italian American Sports Hall of Fame.

In March 2006, Pep resided at a nursing home in Connecticut, diagnosed with dementia pugilistica, before his death on November 23, 2006. He is buried in Rocky Hill, CT. He left four children, William "Billy" Papaleo, Mary Papaleo, Michael Papaleo and Melissa Papaleo, and three stepchildren, April, L.J., Holly Miller.

== Honors ==
In 1945, Pep was voted Fighter of the Year by The Ring magazine.

The Sporting News recognized Pep as the Fighter of the Decade for the 1940s.

He was inducted into the International Boxing Hall of Fame in its inaugural year of 1990.

In 1994, Pep was honored with the Barney Nagler Award by the Boxing Writers Association of America in recognition of his long and meritorious service.

Pep was ranked sixth on Ring Magazine's list of the 80 Best Fighters of the Last 80 Years in 2002. Pep was also named the third greatest fighter of all time by Bert Sugar.

Pep was ranked 5th on ESPN's 50 Greatest Boxers Of All Time list in 2007.

In 2009, BoxingScene ranked him the greatest featherweight boxer of all time.

Willie Pep was voted as the Greatest Featherweight Ever by the Houston Boxing Hall Of Fame in 2014. The HBHOF is a voting body composed totally of current and former fighters.

In 2011, the city of Middletown, Connecticut constructed the Willie Pep Skatepark named in honor of Pep.

== Film ==
In 2023, The Featherweight, a feature film based on Pep's life, premiered at the 80th Venice International Film Festival. Directed by Robert Kolodny, the biographical film stars James Madio as Willie Pep and focuses primarily on the period before Pep's 1965 comeback. Lawrence Gilliard Jr. portrays Sandy Saddler, Stephen Lang plays Pep's trainer Bill Gore, Keir Gilchrist is Pep's son Billy, Ron Livingston is Pep's manager Bob Kaplan and Ruby Wolf portrays Pep's young wife Linda.

== "No-punch" round ==
There are claims that Pep won the third round in his fight against Jackie Graves in a fight on July 25, 1946, without throwing a punch. The "no-punch" winning round is disputed; several contemporary newspaper articles make no mention of it, and an account in The Minneapolis Star describes the third round as "toe to toe slugging with Pep inflicting his best punishment with a right to the body". Pep supposedly tipped off a few ringside reporters before the bout and told them he would win the third round without throwing "a punch of anger."

== Professional boxing record ==
241 fights	229 wins	11 losses
By knockout	65	6
By decision	164	5
Draws	1	

No.	Result	Record	Opponent	Type	Round, time	Date	Age	Location	Notes
241	Loss	229–11–1	Calvin Woodland	UD	6	Mar 16, 1966	43 years, 178 days	City Arena, Richmond, Virginia, US	
240	Win	229–10–1	Ray Coleman	KO	5 (10)	Oct 25, 1965	43 years, 36 days	Sports Center, Tucson, Arizona, US	
239	Win	228–10–1	Sergio Musquiz	TKO	5 (10)	Oct 14, 1965	43 years, 25 days	Sportatorium, Phoenix, Arizona, US	
238	Win	227–10–1	Tommy Haden	TKO	3 (10), 1:33	Oct 4, 1965	43 years, 15 days	Rhode Island Auditorium, Providence, Pennsylvania, US	
237	Win	226–10–1	Willie Little	TKO	3 (10)	Oct 1, 1965	43 years, 12 days	War Memorial Arena, Johnstown, Pennsylvania, US	
236	Win	225–10–1	Johnny Gilmore	PTS	6	Sep 28, 1965	43 years, 9 days	Arena, Philadelphia, Pennsylvania, US	
235	Win	224–10–1	Benny 'Red' Randall	UD	10	Jul 21, 1965	42 years, 305 days	Old Coliseum, Quebec City, Quebec, Canada	
234	Win	223–10–1	Johnny Gilmore	UD	6	May 21, 1965	42 years, 244 days	Crystal Arena, Norwalk, Connecticut, US	
233	Win	222–10–1	Jackie Lennon	UD	6	Apr 26, 1965	42 years, 219 days	Arena, Philadelphia, Pennsylvania, US	
232	Win	221–10–1	Harold McKeever	UD	8	Mar 11, 1959	36 years, 173 days	Little River Auditorium, Miami, Florida, US	
231	Loss	220–10–1	Sonny Leon	UD	10	Jan 26, 1959	36 years, 129 days	Nuevo Circo, Caracas, Venezuela	
230	Loss	220–9–1	Hogan 'Kid' Bassey	TKO	9 (10)	Sep 20, 1958	36 years, 1 day	Boston Garden, Boston, Massachusetts, US	
229	Win	220–8–1	Al Duarte	UD	10	Aug 26, 1958	35 years, 341 days	Glovers Bowl, North Adams, Massachusetts, US	
228	Win	219–8–1	Jesse Rodriguez	UD	10	Aug 9, 1958	35 years, 324 days	Lake County Fairgrounds, Painesville, Ohio, US	
227	Win	218–8–1	Luis Carmona	UD	10	Aug 4, 1958	35 years, 319 days	Northern Maine Fairgrounds, Presque Isle, Maine, US	
226	Win	217–8–1	Bobby Bell	UD	10	Jul 17, 1958	35 years, 301 days	Arena, Norwood, Massachusetts, US	
225	Win	216–8–1	Bobby Soares	UD	10	Jul 1, 1958	35 years, 285 days	Memorial Hall, Athol, Massachusetts, US	
224	Win	215–8–1	Pat McCoy	UD	10	Jun 23, 1958	35 years, 277 days	Sargent Field, New Bedford, Massachusetts, US	
223	Win	214–8–1	Bobby Singleton	UD	10	May 20, 1958	35 years, 243 days	Mechanics Building, Boston, Massachusetts, US	
222	Win	213–8–1	Jimmy Kelly	UD	10	Apr 29, 1958	35 years, 222 days	Mechanics Building, Boston, Massachusetts, US	
221	Win	212–8–1	Cleo Ortiz	UD	10	Apr 14, 1958	35 years, 207 days	Arcadia Ballroom, Providence, Rhode Island, US	
220	Win	211–8–1	George Stephany	PTS	10	Apr 8, 1958	35 years, 201 days	Arena, Bristol, Connecticut, US	
219	Win	210–8–1	Prince Johnson	UD	10	Mar 31, 1958	35 years, 193 days	Valley Arena, Holyoke, Massachusetts, US	
218	Loss	209–8–1	Tommy Tibbs	SD	10	Jan 14, 1958	35 years, 117 days	Mechanics Building, Boston, Massachusetts, US	
217	Win	209–7–1	Jimmy Connors	UD	10	Dec 17, 1957	35 years, 89 days	Boston Garden, Boston, Massachusetts, US	
216	Win	208–7–1	Russell Tague	UD	10	Jul 23, 1957	34 years, 307 days	Sam Houston Coliseum, Houston, Texas, US	
215	Win	207–7–1	Manny Castro	UD	10	Jul 16, 1957	34 years, 300 days	County Coliseum, El Paso, Texas, US	
214	Win	206–7–1	Manny Castro	UD	10	May 10, 1957	34 years, 233 days	Memorial Stadium, Florence, South Carolina, US	
213	Win	205–7–1	Cesar Morales	UD	10	Apr 23, 1957	34 years, 216 days	War Memorial Auditorium, Fort Lauderdale, Florida, US	
212	Win	204–7–1	Hector Bacquettes	TKO	5 (10)	Jul 4, 1956	33 years, 289 days	Roosevelt Stadium, Lawton, Oklahoma, US	
211	Win	203–7–1	Russell Tague	RTD	6 (10), 3:00	Jun 19, 1956	33 years, 274 days	Auditorium, Miami Beach, Florida, US	
210	Win	202–7–1	Manuel Armenteros	RTD	6 (10), 3:00	May 22, 1956	33 years, 246 days	Municipal Auditorium, San Antonio, Texas, US	
209	Win	201–7–1	Jackie Blair	PTS	10	Apr 17, 1956	33 years, 211 days	State Theatre, Hartford, Connecticut, US	
208	Win	200–7–1	Buddy Baggett	UD	10	Mar 27, 1956	33 years, 190 days	Sportatorium, Beaumont, Texas, US	
207	Win	199–7–1	Kid Campeche	UD	10	Mar 16, 1956	33 years, 179 days	Fort Homer Hesterly Armory, Tampa, Florida, US	
206	Win	198–7–1	Andy Arel	UD	10	Dec 28, 1955	33 years, 100 days	Auditorium, Miami Beach, Florida, US	
205	Win	197–7–1	Leo Carter	TKO	4 (?), 1:13	Dec 13, 1955	33 years, 85 days	Auditorium, Houston, Texas, US	
204	Win	196–7–1	Henry 'Pappy' Gault	UD	10	Nov 29, 1955	33 years, 71 days	Fort Homer Hesterly Armory, Tampa, Florida, US	
203	Win	195–7–1	Charley Titone	UD	10	Oct 10, 1955	33 years, 21 days	Maple Arena, Brockton, Massachusetts, US	
202	Win	194–7–1	Henry 'Pappy' Gault	UD	10	Sep 27, 1955	33 years, 8 days	Valley Arena, Holyoke, Massachusetts, US	
201	Win	193–7–1	Jimmy Ithia	TKO	6 (10), 1:54	Sep 13, 1955	32 years, 359 days	State Theatre, Hartford, Connecticut, US	
200	Win	192–7–1	Hector Rodriguez	PTS	10	Jul 12, 1955	32 years, 296 days	Hedges Stadium, Bridgeport, Connecticut, US	
199	Win	191–7–1	Mickey Mars	TKO	7 (10), 0:52	Jun 14, 1955	32 years, 268 days	Auditorium, Miami Beach, Florida, US	
198	Win	190–7–1	Joey Cam	TKO	3 (10), 3:00	Jun 1, 1955	32 years, 255 days	Arena, Boston, Massachusetts, US	
197	Win	189–7–1	Gil Cadilli	UD	10	May 18, 1955	32 years, 241 days	Olympia Stadium, Detroit, Michigan, US	
196	Loss	188–7–1	Gil Cadilli	SD	10	Mar 30, 1955	32 years, 192 days	Parks Air Force Base, California, US	
195	Win	188–6–1	Charley Titone	UD	10	Mar 22, 1955	32 years, 184 days	Valley Arena, Holyoke, Massachusetts, US	
194	Win	187–6–1	Myrel Olmstead	UD	10	Mar 11, 1955	32 years, 173 days	State Armory, Bennington, Vermont, US	
193	Win	186–6–1	Mario 'Eladio' Colon	PTS	10	Nov 1, 1954	32 years, 43 days	Beach Arena, Daytona Beach, Florida, US	
192	Win	185–6–1	Til LeBlanc	UD	10	Aug 18, 1954	31 years, 333 days	Moncton Arena, Moncton, New Brunswick, Canada	
191	Win	184–6–1	Mike Tourcotte	UD	10	Jul 24, 1954	31 years, 308 days	Hartwell Field, Mobile, Alabama, US	
190	Loss	183–6–1	Lulu Perez	TKO	2 (10), 1:53	Feb 26, 1954	31 years, 160 days	Madison Square Garden, New York City, New York, US	
189	Win	183–5–1	Davey Seabrook	UD	10	Jan 19, 1954	31 years, 122 days	Naval Air Station, Jacksonville, Florida, US	
188	Win	182–5–1	Tony Longo	UD	10	Dec 15, 1953	31 years, 87 days	Auditorium, Miami Beach, Florida, US	
187	Win	181–5–1	Billy Lima	TKO	2 (10)	Dec 8, 1953	31 years, 80 days	City Auditorium, Houston, Texas, US	
186	Win	180–5–1	Davey Allen	PTS	10	Dec 4, 1953	31 years, 76 days	Legion Arena, West Palm Beach, Florida, US	
185	Win	179–5–1	Sonny Luciano	UD	10	Nov 21, 1953	31 years, 63 days	Armory, Charlotte, North Carolina, US	
184	Win	178–5–1	Pat Marcune	TKO	10 (10), 0:14	Jun 5, 1953	30 years, 259 days	Madison Square Garden, New York City, New York, US	
183	Win	177–5–1	Jackie Blair	UD	10	May 13, 1953	30 years, 236 days	Will Rogers Coliseum, Fort Worth, Texas, US	
182	Win	176–5–1	Noel Paquette	UD	10	Apr 7, 1953	30 years, 200 days	Auditorium, Miami Beach, Florida, US	
181	Win	175–5–1	Joey Gambino	UD	10	Mar 31, 1953	30 years, 193 days	Fort Homer Hesterly Armory, Tampa, Florida, US	
180	Win	174–5–1	Pepe Alvarez	PTS	10	Feb 10, 1953	30 years, 144 days	Municipal Auditorium, San Antonio, Texas, US	
179	Win	173–5–1	Dave Mitchell	UD	10	Jan 27, 1953	30 years, 130 days	Auditorium, Miami Beach, Florida, US	
178	Win	172–5–1	Billy Lauderdale	UD	10	Jan 19, 1953	30 years, 122 days	Nassau Stadium, Nassau, Bahamas	
177	Win	171–5–1	Jorge Sanchez	PTS	10	Dec 5, 1952	30 years, 77 days	Legion Arena, West Palm Beach, Florida, US	
176	Win	170–5–1	Fabela Chavez	UD	10	Nov 19, 1952	30 years, 61 days	Arena, Saint Louis, Missouri, US	
175	Win	169–5–1	Manny Castro	TKO	5 (10), 0:55	Nov 5, 1952	30 years, 47 days	Auditorium, Miami Beach, Florida, US	
174	Win	168–5–1	Billy Lima	UD	10	Oct 20, 1952	30 years, 31 days	Baseball Park, Jacksonville, Florida, US	
173	Win	167–5–1	Armand Savoie	UD	10	Oct 1, 1952	30 years, 12 days	Chicago Stadium, Chicago, Illinois, US	
172	Win	166–5–1	Bobby Woods	UD	10	Sep 11, 1952	29 years, 358 days	Denman Auditorium, Vancouver, British Columbia, Canada	
171	Win	165–5–1	Billy Lima	UD	10	Sep 3, 1952	29 years, 350 days	Legion Field, Pensacola, Florida, US	
170	Loss	164–5–1	Tommy Collins	TKO	6 (10), 0:55	Jun 30, 1952	29 years, 285 days	Boston Garden, Boston, Massachusetts, US	
169	Win	164–4–1	Claude Hammond	UD	10	May 21, 1952	29 years, 245 days	Auditorium, Miami Beach, Florida, US	
168	Win	163–4–1	Buddy Baggett	KO	5 (10)	May 10, 1952	29 years, 234 days	Eustis Park, Aiken, South Carolina, US	
167	Win	162–4–1	Kenny Leach	PTS	10	May 5, 1952	29 years, 229 days	Golden Park, Columbus, Ohio, US	
166	Win	161–4–1	Santiago Gonzalez	UD	10	Apr 29, 1952	29 years, 223 days	Fort Homer Hesterly Armory, Tampa, Florida, US	
165	Loss	160–4–1	Sandy Saddler	RTD	9 (15), 3:00	Sep 26, 1951	29 years, 7 days	Polo Grounds, New York City, New York, US	For NYSAC, NBA, and The Ring featherweight titles
164	Win	160–3–1	Rodolfo Gonzales	UD	10	Sep 4, 1951	28 years, 350 days	Municipal Auditorium, New Orleans, Louisiana, US	
163	Win	159–3–1	Jesus Compos	UD	10	Jun 4, 1951	28 years, 258 days	Coliseum, Baltimore, Maryland, US	
162	Win	158–3–1	Eddie Chavez	MD	10	Apr 27, 1951	28 years, 220 days	Cow Palace, Daly City, California, US	
161	Win	157–3–1	Baby Neff Ortiz	TKO	5 (10), 2:24	Apr 17, 1951	28 years, 210 days	Kiel Auditorium, Saint Louis, Missouri, US	
160	Win	156–3–1	Pat Iacobucci	UD	10	Mar 26, 1951	28 years, 188 days	Auditorium, Miami Beach, Florida, US	
159	Win	155–3–1	Carlos Chávez	UD	10	Mar 5, 1951	28 years, 167 days	Coliseum Arena, New Orleans, Louisiana, US	
158	Win	154–3–1	Eddie Webb	TKO	2 (10), 1:05	Feb 26, 1951	28 years, 160 days	Legion Coliseum, Sarasota, Florida, US	
157	Win	153–3–1	Tommy Baker	TKO	4 (10), 1:29	Jan 30, 1951	28 years, 133 days	Auditorium, Hartford, Connecticut, US	
156	Loss	152–3–1	Sandy Saddler	RTD	8 (15), 3:00	Sep 8, 1950	27 years, 354 days	Yankee Stadium, New York City, New York, US	Lost NYSAC, NBA, and The Ring featherweight titles
155	Win	152–2–1	Proctor Heinhold	UD	10	Aug 2, 1950	27 years, 317 days	Catholic Youth Center, Scranton, Pennsylvania, US	
154	Win	151–2–1	Bobby Bell	UD	10	Jul 25, 1950	27 years, 309 days	Griffith Stadium, Washington, DC, US	
153	Win	150–2–1	Bobby Timpson	UD	10	Jun 26, 1950	27 years, 280 days	Outdoor Arena, Hartford, Connecticut, US	
152	Win	149–2–1	Terry Young	UD	10	Jun 1, 1950	27 years, 255 days	Arena, Milwaukee, Wisconsin, US	
151	Win	148–2–1	Asuncion Llanos	KO	2 (10), 1:10	May 15, 1950	27 years, 238 days	Auditorium, Hartford, Connecticut, US	
150	Win	147–2–1	Ray Famechon	UD	15	Mar 17, 1950	27 years, 179 days	Madison Square Garden, New York City, New York, US	Retained NYSAC, NBA, and The Ring featherweight titles
149	Win	146–2–1	Jimmy Warren	UD	10	Feb 22, 1950	27 years, 156 days	Dinner Key Auditorium, Coconut Grove, Florida, US	
148	Win	145–2–1	Roy Andrews	UD	10	Feb 6, 1950	27 years, 140 days	Boston Garden, Boston, Massachusetts, US	
147	Win	144–2–1	Charley Riley	KO	5 (15), 1:05	Jan 16, 1950	27 years, 119 days	Kiel Auditorium, Saint Louis, Missouri, US	Retained NYSAC, NBA, and The Ring featherweight titles
146	Win	143–2–1	Harold Dade	UD	10	Dec 12, 1949	27 years, 84 days	Kiel Auditorium, Saint Louis, Missouri, US	
145	Win	142–2–1	Eddie Campo	TKO	7 (15), 0:41	Sep 20, 1949	27 years, 1 day	Municipal Stadium, Waterbury, Massachusetts, US	Retained NYSAC, NBA, and The Ring featherweight titles
144	Win	141–2–1	Jean Mougin	UD	10	Jul 12, 1949	26 years, 296 days	MacArthur Stadium, Syracuse, New York, US	
143	Win	140–2–1	Johnny LaRusso	UD	10	Jun 20, 1949	26 years, 274 days	Century Stadium, West Springfield, Massachusetts, US	
142	Win	139–2–1	Al Pennino	UD	10	Jun 14, 1949	26 years, 268 days	Wahconah Park, Pittsfield, Massachusetts, US	
141	Win	138–2–1	Luis Ramos	PTS	10	Jun 6, 1949	26 years, 260 days	Arena, New Haven, Connecticut, US	
140	Win	137–2–1	Sandy Saddler	UD	15	Feb 11, 1949	26 years, 145 days	Madison Square Garden, New York City, New York, US	Won NYSAC, NBA, and The Ring featherweight titles
139	Win	136–2–1	Teddy Davis	UD	10	Jan 17, 1949	26 years, 120 days	Kiel Auditorium, Saint Louis, Missouri, US	
138	Win	135–2–1	Hermie Freeman	UD	10	Dec 20, 1948	26 years, 92 days	Boston Garden, Boston, Massachusetts, US	
137	Loss	134–2–1	Sandy Saddler	KO	4 (15), 2:38	Oct 29, 1948	26 years, 40 days	Madison Square Garden, New York City, New York, US	Lost NYSAC, NBA, and The Ring featherweight titles
136	Win	134–1–1	Johnny LaRusso	PTS	10	Oct 19, 1948	26 years, 30 days	Auditorium, Hartford, Connecticut, US	
135	Win	133–1–1	Chuck Burton	PTS	8	Oct 12, 1948	26 years, 23 days	Jersey City Gardens, Jersey City, New Jersey, US	
134	Win	132–1–1	Paddy DeMarco	UD	10	Sep 10, 1948	25 years, 357 days	Madison Square Garden, New York City, New York, US	
133	Win	131–1–1	Johnny Dell	TKO	8 (10)	Sep 2, 1948	25 years, 349 days	Municipal Stadium, Waterbury, Connecticut, US	
132	Win	130–1–1	Teddy Davis	PTS	10	Aug 17, 1948	25 years, 333 days	Auditorium Outdoor Arena, Hartford, Connecticut, US	
131	Win	129–1–1	Teddy Davis	PTS	10	Aug 3, 1948	25 years, 319 days	Auditorium Outdoor Arena, Hartford, Connecticut, US	
130	Win	128–1–1	Young Junior	KO	1 (10)	Jul 28, 1948	25 years, 313 days	Bennett's Field, Utica, New York, US	
129	Win	127–1–1	Luther Burgess	UD	10	Jun 25, 1948	25 years, 280 days	Atwood Stadium, Flint, Michigan, US	
128	Win	126–1–1	Miguel Acevedo	UD	10	Jun 17, 1948	25 years, 272 days	Auditorium, Minneapolis, Minnesota, US	
127	Win	125–1–1	Charley Lewis	UD	10	May 19, 1948	25 years, 243 days	Auditorium, Milwaukee, Wisconsin, US	
126	Win	124–1–1	Leroy Willis	UD	10	May 7, 1948	25 years, 231 days	Olympia Stadium, Detroit, Michigan, US	
125	Win	123–1–1	Humberto Sierra	TKO	10 (15), 0:22	Feb 24, 1948	25 years, 158 days	Orange Bowl, Miami, Florida, US	Retained NYSAC, NBA, and The Ring featherweight titles
124	Win	122–1–1	Joey Angelo	UD	10	Jan 19, 1948	25 years, 122 days	Boston Garden, Boston, Massachusetts, US	
123	Win	121–1–1	Jimmy McAllister	UD	10	Jan 12, 1948	25 years, 115 days	Kiel Auditorium, Saint Louis, Missouri, US	
122	Win	120–1–1	Pedro Biesca	PTS	10	Jan 6, 1948	25 years, 109 days	Auditorium, Hartford, Connecticut, US	
121	Win	119–1–1	Lefty LaChance	TKO	8 (10)	Dec 30, 1947	25 years, 102 days	Recreation Center, Manchester, New Hampshire, US	
120	Win	118–1–1	Alvaro Estrada	UD	10	Dec 22, 1947	25 years, 94 days	City Hall, Lewiston, Maine, US	
119	Win	117–1–1	Archie Wilmer	MD	10	Oct 27, 1947	25 years, 38 days	Arena, Philadelphia, Pennsylvania, US	
118	Win	116–1–1	Jean Barriere	KO	1 (10), 2:07	Oct 21, 1947	25 years, 32 days	Exposition Building, Portland, Maine, US	
117	Win	115–1–1	Jock Leslie	KO	12 (15), 0:45	Aug 22, 1947	24 years, 337 days	Atwood Stadium, Flint, Michigan, US	Retained NYSAC, NBA, and The Ring featherweight titles
116	Win	114–1–1	Humberto Sierra	UD	10	Jul 23, 1947	24 years, 307 days	Auditorium Outdoor Arena, Hartford, Connecticut, US	
115	Win	113–1–1	Paulie Jackson	UD	10	Jul 15, 1947	24 years, 299 days	Sargent Field, New Bedford, Massachusetts, US	
114	Win	112–1–1	Jean Barriere	KO	4 (10), 1:58	Jul 11, 1947	24 years, 295 days	Meadowbrook Arena, North Adams, Massachusetts, US	
113	Win	111–1–1	Leo LeBrun	PTS	8	Jul 8, 1947	24 years, 292 days	Crystal Arena, Norwalk, Connecticut, US	
112	Win	110–1–1	Joey Fontana	KO	5 (10), 1:00	Jul 1, 1947	24 years, 285 days	Hawkins Stadium, Albany, New York, US	
111	Win	109–1–1	Victor Flores	PTS	10	Jun 17, 1947	24 years, 271 days	Auditorium, Hartford, Connecticut, US	
110	Win	108–1–1	Chalky Wright	KO	3 (10), 1:05	Nov 27, 1946	24 years, 69 days	Auditorium, Milwaukee, Wisconsin, US	
109	Win	107–1–1	Tomas Beato	KO	2 (10)	Nov 15, 1946	24 years, 57 days	State Armory, Waterbury, Connecticut, US	
108	Win	106–1–1	Paulie Jackson	PTS	10	Nov 1, 1946	24 years, 43 days	Auditorium, Minneapolis, Minnesota, US	
107	Win	105–1–1	Lefty LaChance	TKO	3 (10), 1:47	Sep 17, 1946	23 years, 363 days	Auditorium Outdoor Arena, Hartford, Connecticut, US	
106	Win	104–1–1	Walter Kolby	TKO	5 (10), 2:26	Sep 4, 1946	23 years, 350 days	Memorial Auditorium, Buffalo, New York, US	
105	Win	103–1–1	Doll Rafferty	KO	6 (10), 1:10	Aug 26, 1946	23 years, 341 days	Auditorium, Milwaukee, Wisconsin, US	
104	Win	102–1–1	Jackie Graves	TKO	8 (10), 1:52	Jul 25, 1946	23 years, 309 days	Auditorium, Minneapolis, Minnesota, US	
103	Win	101–1–1	Harold Gibson	TKO	7 (10), 2:21	Jul 10, 1946	23 years, 294 days	Civic Stadium, Buffalo, New York, US	
102	Win	100–1–1	Sal Bartolo	KO	12 (15), 2:41	Jun 7, 1946	23 years, 261 days	Madison Square Garden, New York City, New York, US	Retained NYSAC and The Ring featherweight titles; Won NBA featherweight title
101	Win	99–1–1	Jimmy Joyce	PTS	8	May 27, 1946	23 years, 250 days	Auditorium, Minneapolis, Minnesota, US	
100	Win	98–1–1	Jose Aponte Torres	UD	10	May 22, 1946	23 years, 245 days	Kiel Auditorium, Saint Louis, Missouri, US	
99	Win	97–1–1	Joey Angelo	UD	10	May 13, 1946	23 years, 236 days	Rhode Island Auditorium, Providence, Rhode Island, US	
98	Win	96–1–1	Ernie Petrone	PTS	10	May 6, 1946	23 years, 229 days	Arena, New Haven, Connecticut, US	
97	Win	95–1–1	Georgie Knox	TKO	3 (10), 1:45	Apr 8, 1946	23 years, 201 days	Rhode Island Auditorium, Providence, Rhode Island, US	
96	Win	94–1–1	Jackie Wilson	UD	10	Mar 26, 1946	23 years, 188 days	Municipal Auditorium, Kansas City, Missouri, US	
95	Win	93–1–1	Jimmy McAllister	KO	2 (10), 2:44	Mar 1, 1946	23 years, 163 days	Madison Square Garden, New York City, New York, US	
94	Win	92–1–1	Jimmy Joyce	UD	10	Feb 13, 1946	23 years, 147 days	Memorial Auditorium, Buffalo, New York, US	
93	Win	91–1–1	Johnny Virgo	KO	2 (10), 1:05	Jan 15, 1946	23 years, 118 days	Memorial Auditorium, Buffalo, New York, US	
92	Draw	90–1–1	Jimmy McAllister	MD	10	Dec 13, 1945	23 years, 85 days	Baltimore Garden, Baltimore, Maryland, US	
91	Win	90–1	Harold Gibson	PTS	10	Dec 5, 1945	23 years, 77 days	Armory, Lewiston, Maine, US	
90	Win	89–1	Eddie Giosa	UD	10	Nov 26, 1945	23 years, 68 days	Mechanics Building, Boston, Massachusetts, US	
89	Win	88–1	Mike Martyk	TKO	5 (10), 2:39	Nov 5, 1945	23 years, 47 days	Memorial Auditorium, Buffalo, New York, US	
88	Win	87–1	Paulie Jackson	PTS	8	Oct 30, 1945	23 years, 41 days	Auditorium, Hartford, Connecticut, US	
87	Win	86–1	Phil Terranova	UD	15	Feb 19, 1945	22 years, 153 days	Madison Square Garden, New York City, New York, US	Retained NYSAC and The Ring featherweight titles
86	Win	85–1	Willie Roache	PTS	10	Feb 5, 1945	22 years, 139 days	Arena, New Haven, Connecticut, US	
85	Win	84–1	Ralph Walton	PTS	10	Jan 23, 1945	22 years, 126 days	Auditorium, Hartford, Connecticut, US	
84	Win	83–1	Chalky Wright	UD	10	Dec 5, 1944	22 years, 77 days	Arena, Cleveland, Cleveland, US	
83	Win	82–1	Pedro Hernández	PTS	10	Nov 27, 1944	22 years, 69 days	Uline Arena, Washington, DC, US	
82	Win	81–1	Charley Lewis	UD	10	Nov 14, 1944	22 years, 56 days	Auditorium, Hartford, Connecticut, US	
81	Win	80–1	Jackie Leamus	UD	10	Oct 25, 1944	22 years, 36 days	Forum, Montreal, Quebec, Canada	
80	Win	79–1	Chalky Wright	UD	15	Sep 29, 1944	22 years, 10 days	Madison Square Garden, New York City, New York, US	Retained NYSAC and The Ring featherweight titles
79	Win	78–1	Charley Lewis	TKO	8 (10), 1:52	Sep 19, 1944	22 years, 0 days	Auditorium Outdoor Arena, Hartford, Connecticut, US	
78	Win	77–1	Joey Peralta	UD	10	Aug 28, 1944	21 years, 344 days	Century Stadium, West Springfield, Massachusetts, US	
77	Win	76–1	Lulu Costantino	UD	10	Aug 4, 1944	21 years, 320 days	Municipal Stadium, Waterbury, Connecticut, US	
76	Win	75–1	Manuel Ortiz	UD	10	Jul 17, 1944	21 years, 302 days	Braves Field, Boston, Massachusetts, US	
75	Win	74–1	Willie Joyce	UD	10	Jul 7, 1944	21 years, 292 days	Comiskey Park, Chicago, Illinois, US	
74	Win	73–1	Julie Kogon	PTS	10	Jun 6, 1944	21 years, 261 days	Memorial Auditorium, Buffalo, New York, US	
73	Win	72–1	Joey Bagnato	KO	2 (10), 1:03	May 23, 1944	21 years, 247 days	Memorial Auditorium, Buffalo, New York, US	
72	Win	71–1	Frankie Rubino	PTS	10	May 19, 1944	21 years, 243 days	Coliseum, Chicago, Illinois, US	
71	Win	70–1	Jackie Leamus	UD	10	May 1, 1944	21 years, 225 days	Arena, Philadelphia, Pennsylvania, US	
70	Win	69–1	Harold 'Snooks' Lacey	PTS	10	Apr 20, 1944	21 years, 214 days	Arena, New Haven, Connecticut, US	
69	Win	68–1	Leo Francis	PTS	10	Apr 4, 1944	21 years, 198 days	Auditorium, Hartford, Connecticut, US	
68	Win	67–1	Sal Bartolo	UD	15	Jun 8, 1943	20 years, 262 days	Braves Field, Boston, Massachusetts, US	Retained NYSAC and The Ring featherweight titles
67	Win	66–1	Jackie Wilson	UD	12	Apr 26, 1943	20 years, 219 days	Duquesne Gardens, Pittsburgh, Pennsylvania, US	
66	Win	65–1	Angel Aviles	PTS	10	Apr 19, 1943	20 years, 212 days	Municipal Auditorium, Tampa, Florida, US	
65	Win	64–1	Sal Bartolo	SD	10	Apr 9, 1943	20 years, 202 days	Boston Garden, Boston, Massachusetts, US	
64	Win	63–1	Bobby McIntire	UD	10	Mar 29, 1943	20 years, 191 days	Arena Gardens, Detroit, Michigan, US	
63	Loss	62–1	Sammy Angott	UD	10	Mar 19, 1943	20 years, 181 days	Madison Square Garden, New York City, New York, US	
62	Win	62–0	Lou Transparenti	KO	6 (10), 1:20	Mar 2, 1943	20 years, 164 days	Auditorium, Hartford, Connecticut, US	
61	Win	61–0	Bill Speary	UD	10	Feb 15, 1943	20 years, 149 days	Coliseum, Baltimore, Maryland, US	
60	Win	60–0	Davey Crawford	UD	10	Feb 11, 1943	20 years, 145 days	Mechanics Building, Boston, Massachusetts, US	
59	Win	59–0	Allie Stolz	UD	10	Jan 29, 1943	20 years, 132 days	Madison Square Garden, New York City, New York, US	
58	Win	58–0	Bill Speary	PTS	10	Jan 19, 1943	20 years, 122 days	Auditorium, Hartford, Connecticut, US	
57	Win	57–0	Vince Dell'Orto	PTS	10	Jan 4, 1943	20 years, 107 days	Municipal Auditorium, New Orleans, New Orleans, US	
56	Win	56–0	Joey Silva	RTD	9 (10)	Dec 21, 1942	20 years, 93 days	Washington Hotel Auditorium, Jacksonville, Florida, US	
55	Win	55–0	Jose Aponte Torres	TKO	7 (10)	Dec 14, 1942	20 years, 86 days	Turner's Arena, Washington, DC, US	
54	Win	54–0	Chalky Wright	UD	15	Nov 20, 1942	20 years, 62 days	Madison Square Garden, New York City, New York, US	Won NYSAC and The Ring featherweight titles
53	Win	53–0	George Zengaras	PTS	10	Oct 27, 1942	20 years, 38 days	Auditorium, Hartford, Connecticut, US	
52	Win	52–0	Joey Archibald	UD	10	Oct 16, 1942	20 years, 27 days	Rhode Island Auditorium, Providence, Rhode Island, US	
51	Win	51–0	Bobby McIntire	UD	10	Oct 5, 1942	20 years, 16 days	Valley Arena, Holyoke, Massachusetts, US	
50	Win	50–0	Vince Dell'Orto	PTS	10	Sep 22, 1942	20 years, 3 days	Bulkeley Stadium, Hartford, Connecticut, US	
49	Win	49–0	Frank Franconeri	TKO	1 (8), 2:07	Sep 10, 1942	19 years, 356 days	Madison Square Garden, New York City, New York, US	
48	Win	48–0	Bobby Ivy	TKO	10 (10), 1:30	Sep 1, 1942	19 years, 347 days	White City Stadium, West Haven, Connecticut, US	
47	Win	47–0	Nat Litfin	PTS	10	Aug 20, 1942	19 years, 335 days	White City Stadium, West Haven, Connecticut, US	
46	Win	46–0	Pedro Hernandez	PTS	10	Aug 11, 1942	19 years, 326 days	Bulkeley Stadium, Hartford, Connecticut, US	
45	Win	45–0	Joey Silva	RTD	7 (8)	Aug 1, 1942	19 years, 316 days	Randolph-Clowes Stadium, Waterbury, Connecticut, US	
44	Win	44–0	Abe Denner	PTS	12	Jul 21, 1942	19 years, 305 days	Bulkeley Stadium, Hartford, Connecticut, US	Won USA New England featherweight title
43	Win	43–0	Joey Archibald	PTS	10	Jun 23, 1942	19 years, 277 days	Bulkeley Stadium, Hartford, Connecticut, US	
42	Win	42–0	Joey Iannotti	PTS	8	May 26, 1942	19 years, 249 days	Auditorium, Hartford, Connecticut, US	
41	Win	41–0	Aaron Seltzer	PTS	8	May 12, 1942	19 years, 235 days	Auditorium, Hartford, Connecticut, US	
40	Win	40–0	Curley Nichols	PTS	8	May 4, 1942	19 years, 227 days	Arena, New Haven, Connecticut, US	
39	Win	39–0	Spider Armstrong	KO	4 (8), 2:40	Apr 14, 1942	19 years, 207 days	Auditorium, Hartford, Connecticut, US	
38	Win	38–0	Johnny Compo	PTS	8	Mar 18, 1942	19 years, 180 days	Arena, New Haven, Connecticut, US	
37	Win	37–0	Willie Roache	PTS	8	Feb 24, 1942	19 years, 158 days	Foot Guard Hall, Hartford, Connecticut, US	
36	Win	36–0	Angelo Callura	PTS	8	Feb 10, 1942	19 years, 144 days	Foot Guard Hall, Hartford, Connecticut, US	
35	Win	35–0	Abie Kaufman	PTS	8	Jan 27, 1942	19 years, 130 days	Foot Guard Hall, Hartford, Connecticut, US	
34	Win	34–0	Sammy Parrotta	PTS	4	Jan 16, 1942	19 years, 119 days	Madison Square Garden, New York City, New York, US	
33	Win	33–0	'Mexican' Joe Rivers	TKO	4 (8)	Jan 8, 1942	19 years, 111 days	Casino, Fall River, Massachusetts, US	
32	Win	32–0	Ruby Garcia	UD	4	Dec 12, 1941	19 years, 84 days	Madison Square Garden, New York City, New York, US	
31	Win	31–0	Davey Crawford	UD	8	Nov 24, 1941	19 years, 66 days	Valley Arena, Holyoke, Massachusetts, US	
30	Win	30–0	Buddy Spencer	UD	4	Nov 7, 1941	19 years, 49 days	Legion Stadium, Hollywood, California, US	
29	Win	29–0	Connie Savoie	TKO	2 (8)	Oct 21, 1941	19 years, 32 days	Foot Guard Hall, Hartford, Connecticut, US	
28	Win	28–0	Carlos Manzano	PTS	8	Oct 9, 1941	19 years, 20 days	Arena, New Haven, Connecticut, US	
27	Win	27–0	Jackie Harris	TKO	1 (8)	Sep 25, 1941	19 years, 6 days	Arena, New Haven, Connecticut, US	
26	Win	26–0	Eddie Flores	KO	1 (8), 2:30	Aug 11, 1941	18 years, 326 days	Carpet City Arena, Thompsonville, Connecticut, US	
25	Win	25–0	Paul Frechette	TKO	3 (6)	Aug 5, 1941	18 years, 320 days	Bulkeley Stadium, Hartford, Connecticut, US	
24	Win	24–0	Jimmy Gilligan	UD	8	Jul 15, 1941	18 years, 299 days	Bulkeley Stadium, Hartford, Connecticut, US	
23	Win	23–0	Eddie DeAngelis	TKO	3 (8)	Jun 24, 1941	18 years, 278 days	Bulkeley Stadium, Hartford, Connecticut, US	
22	Win	22–0	Harry Hintlian	UD	6	Jun 19, 1941	18 years, 273 days	Red Men's Arena, Manchester, Connecticut, US	
21	Win	21–0	Johnny Cockfield	UD	6	May 12, 1941	18 years, 235 days	Valley Arena, Holyoke, Massachusetts, US	
20	Win	20–0	Lou Puglese	KO	2 (6), 1:30	May 6, 1941	18 years, 229 days	Foot Guard Hall, Hartford, Connecticut, US	
19	Win	19–0	Joey Silva	PTS	6	Apr 22, 1941	18 years, 215 days	Foot Guard Hall, Hartford, Connecticut, US	
18	Win	18–0	Henry Vasquez	UD	6	Apr 14, 1941	18 years, 207 days	Valley Arena, Holyoke, Massachusetts, US	
17	Win	17–0	Joey Gatto	KO	2 (6)	Mar 31, 1941	18 years, 193 days	Valley Arena, Holyoke, Massachusetts, US	
16	Win	16–0	Marty Shapiro	PTS	6	Mar 25, 1941	18 years, 187 days	Foot Guard Hall, Hartford, Connecticut, US	
15	Win	15–0	Ruby Garcia	UD	6	Mar 3, 1941	18 years, 165 days	Valley Arena, Holyoke, Massachusetts, US	
14	Win	14–0	Ruby Garcia	UD	6	Feb 17, 1941	18 years, 151 days	Valley Arena, Holyoke, Massachusetts, US	
13	Win	13–0	Don Lyons	KO	2 (6)	Feb 10, 1941	18 years, 144 days	Valley Arena, Holyoke, Massachusetts, US	
12	Win	12–0	Augie Almeida	TKO	6 (6), 2:20	Jan 28, 1941	18 years, 131 days	Arena, New Haven, Connecticut, US	
11	Win	11–0	Joe Echevarria	UD	6	Jan 13, 1941	18 years, 116 days	Valley Arena, Holyoke, Massachusetts, US	
10	Win	10–0	Jimmy Mutone	KO	2 (6)	Dec 6, 1940	18 years, 78 days	Stanley Arena, New Britain, Connecticut, US	
9	Win	9–0	Frank Topazio	TKO	5 (6)	Nov 29, 1940	18 years, 71 days	Stanley Arena, New Britain, Connecticut, US	
8	Win	8–0	Carlo Daponde	TKO	6 (6)	Nov 22, 1940	18 years, 64 days	Stanley Arena, New Britain, Connecticut, US	
7	Win	7–0	James McGovern	PTS	4	Oct 24, 1940	18 years, 35 days	Arena, New Haven, Connecticut, US	
6	Win	6–0	Jimmy Ritchie	TKO	3 (6)	Oct 3, 1940	18 years, 14 days	Municipal Stadium, Waterbury, Connecticut, US	
5	Win	5–0	Jackie Moore	UD	6	Sep 19, 1940	18 years, 0 days	Bulkeley Stadium, Hartford, Connecticut, US	
4	Win	4–0	Joey Marcus	UD	4	Sep 5, 1940	17 years, 352 days	Randolph-Clowes Stadium, Waterbury, Connecticut, US	
3	Win	3–0	Tommy Burns	TKO	1 (4)	Aug 29, 1940	17 years, 345 days	Bulkeley Stadium, Hartford, Connecticut, US	
2	Win	2–0	Joey Wasnick	KO	3 (4)	Aug 8, 1940	17 years, 324 days	Bulkeley Stadium, Hartford, Connecticut, US	
1	Win	1–0	Joey Marcus	UD	4	Jul 25, 1940	17 years, 310 days	Bulkeley Stadium, Hartford, Connecticut, US	

== Titles in boxing ==
=== Major world titles ===
- NYSAC featherweight champion (126 lbs) (2×)
- NBA (WBA) featherweight champion (126 lbs) (2×)

=== The Ring magazine titles ===
- The Ring featherweight champion (126 lbs) (2×)

=== Regional/International titles ===
- New England featherweight champion (126 lbs)

=== Undisputed titles ===
- Undisputed featherweight champion (2×)

== See also ==
- Lineal championship

Achievements
Preceded by Albert "Chalky" Wright	World Featherweight Champion; November 20, 1942 – October 29, 1948	Succeeded by Sandy Saddler
Preceded by Sandy Saddler	World Featherweight Champion; February 11, 1949 – September 8, 1950	Succeeded by Sandy Saddler
