= Phil Terranova =

American boxer

Personal information
- Nationality: American
- Born: September 4, 1919 New York, New York, U.S.
- Died: March 16, 2000 (aged 80)
- Height: 5 ft 2 in (1.57 m)
- Weight: Featherweight

Boxing career

Boxing record
- Total fights: 99
- Wins: 67
- Win by KO: 29
- Losses: 21
- Draws: 11
- No contests: 0

Phil Terranova (September 4, 1919 – March 16, 2000) was an American boxer who took the NBA World Featherweight Boxing Championship in 1943 in a bout against Jackie Callura. His manager was Bobby Gleason.

== Early life and career ==
Phil Terranova was born on September 4, 1919, in New York City. In his first sixteen matches between July 1941 and September 1942, he won eight bouts, lost only two and drew six. His two losses were to talented opponents Johnny Dell and Gus Levine in front of large venues. In this first year of fighting he boxed twice in Madison Square Garden.

=== Early career loss to Chalky Wright ===
On June 4, 1943, while still basically an unknown, he was knocked out by former World Featherweight Champion Albert Chalky Wright in five rounds at New York's Madison Square Garden. Terranova was down in the second before being called out in the fifth. He had probably been matched too early in his career with the harder hitting, and more experienced Black boxing talent, who had little trouble with Terranova. Wright also had the benefit of a five inch advantage in reach, as well, at slightly over 5' 7". The fight was Terranova's first knockout in his first thirty fights, but it was certainly to a skilled opponent. In the third round, Terranova launched a successful body attack, but it was neutralized by Wright's longer reach.

== Capturing the NBA World Featherweight Championship ==
Terranova won the National Boxing Association World Featherweight Championship when he knocked out Jackie Callura in front of 8,500 fans in eighth rounds at Pellican Stadium in New Orleans, Louisiana on August 16, 1943. Astonishingly, Terranova had barely two years of professional boxing experience prior to his championship victory. Callura seemed to lead in the early rounds but may have tired by the fifth. Terranova with strong rights and lefts in the seventh, knocked his opponent to the canvas for a count of nine in the eighth. Upon rising, Callura was knocked to the canvas for good, around one minute into the eighth round.

In an upset, perhaps exhaling after his good fortune, he lost to Maurice Lachance, in a ten round non-title decision in Hartford, Connecticut. The referee gave every round to the challenger, who was down only briefly in the eighth, but knocked down Terranova briefly in the seventh. Lachance used his two inch reach advantage and five pound weight advantage to his benefit. It may also be important to note that Lachance was a southpaw, having the ringname "Lefty", which made him more dangerous to a less experienced boxer.

=== Successful defense of NBA World Featherweight Title ===
He defended his title in an NBA World Featherweight Title rematch with Callura on December 27, 1943, before a crowd of around 5,000, scoring a technical knockout in the sixth round at the Colliseum Arena in New Orleans. Callura was on the mat three times in the sixth from rights to the head. On his third fall to the mat from a right to the jaw, the referee stopped the bout after two seconds. Callura threatened only in the fourth round. It was Terranova and Callura's third meeting.

== Loss of the NBA World Featherweight Championship to Sal Bartolo ==
He lost the Featherweight Championship when he was outpointed by Boston native Sal Bartolo before a home crowd of 12,000 on March 10, 1944, in a fifteen round unanimous decision at Boston Garden. Bartolo won with lightning fast left jabs, two handed hooks, and fancy footwork growing even more aggressive in later rounds, though Terranova may have previously been considered the heavier hitter. Bartolo, in some scoring won all fifteen rounds. Though Terranova continued to be dangerous throughout the bout, Bartolo was likely leading in points from the early rounds. The reigning champion had close to five additional years of professional experience to Terranova's two, and perhaps as a result was an 8-5 leader in the pre-fight betting odds.

== Loss of NBA World Featherweight Championship rematch with Bartolo ==
In a World Featherweight Championship rematch on May 5, 1944, before 7,673 fans, Terranova lost again to reigning champion Bartola at Boston Garden in a closer fifteen round split decision. Terranova staggered Bartolo in the eleventh, and landed a number of blows, trying with desperation for a knockout. The effort may have exhausted Terranova as Bartola finished stronger in rounds twelve through fifteen. The United Press gave nine rounds to Bartolo, and only four to Terranova with two even. Though Bartolo scored a series of strong jabs in the first round looking to end the bout quickly, the going was not as easy for him the remainder of the bout, particularly in the second.

== Important matches after loss of NBA Title ==
=== Loss to Harry Jeffra ===
On November 20, 1944, former NYSAC World Featherweight Champion Harry Jeffra scratched out a close victory in a non-title bout against Terranova in a ten round split decision in Baltimore. The crowd of 5,000 probably cheered for Jeffra, their hometown favorite, who ralleyed in the late rounds to win the close decision.

=== Loss to Willie Pep ===
On February 19, 1945, he lost to Willie Pep, in a NYSAC title match at Madison Square Garden before a crowd of 10,000 in a fifteen round unanimous decision. Pep would become a World Featherweight Champion in 1947. He had Terranova close to a knockout in the tenth round, and led throughout, landing nearly continuous blows throughout the match, and scoring often with counterpunches. Each boxer weighed within a pound of the other, but Terranova's shorter reach made infighting difficult, and his stronger punches were often quickly blocked or countered.

=== Win against Sandy Sadler ===
He defeated Sandy Sadler, a top featherweight contender and a future NBA World Featherweight Champion, on July 23, 1946, in a ten round unanimous decision before a crowd of 5,000, at the University of Detroit Stadium in Detroit. Saddler stacked up points in the early rounds, especially during in-fighting as he had a height advantage, but Terranova made a strong showing in later rounds to get the decision. The referee gave Tarranova six of the ten rounds, with three for Saddler and one even.

Terranova retired with a record of 67 wins (29 KOs), 21 losses and 11 draws.

== Boxing achievements and honors ==
Achievements
Preceded by Jackie Callura	NBA World Featherweight Boxing Champion; April 16, 1943 – March 10, 1944	Succeeded by Sal Bartolo

He was elected into the World Boxing Hall of Fame in 1998.
