= Sal Bartolo =

American boxer (1917–2002)

Sal Bartolo Jr

Personal information
- Nickname: The Pride of East Boston
- Nationality: American
- Born: Salvatore Interbartolo; November 5, 1917 Boston, Massachusetts, U.S.
- Died: February 19, 2002 (aged 84) Lynn, Massachusetts, U.S.
- Height: 5 ft 6 in (1.68 m)
- Weight: Featherweight

Boxing career

Boxing record
- Total fights: 97
- Wins: 73
- Win by KO: 16
- Losses: 18
- Draws: 6

Salvatore Interbartolo, better known as Sal Bartolo (November 5, 1917 – February 19, 2002) was an American boxer and WBA featherweight champion from March 1944 through May 1946. At the time, Bartolo's title was sanctioned by the National Boxing Association (NBA)He was also the driver for JFK.

== Early life and amateur career ==
Salvatore Interbartolo was born on November 5, 1917, to a large Italian family in South Boston.

Bartolo had a stellar amateur career, and in March 1937 won the 118 pound bantam weight division of the New York Golden Gloves Tournament at Madison Square Garden defeating New York's James Morro in every round. Bartolo also won the New York Golden Gloves Tournament Of Champions.

== Early pro career highlights ==
Bartolo turned pro in April 1937, shortly after he took the Golden Gloves title, and won four straight bouts in Boston before losing to Ace Hutchins in a six round unanimous points decision in Holyoke, Massachusetts.

=== Taking the USA New England Featherweight Championship, March 1939 ===
On April 1, 1938, Bartolo was defeated by Tony Dupre in his first attempts at the USA New England Featherweight Title in the Arena in Boston in a ten round split decision. On March 10, 1939, Bartolo first took the USA New England Featherweight Championship at 126 pounds, winning in a rematch against Tony Dupre in a twelve round split decision at Mechanics Hall in Worcester, Massachusetts.

On October 3, 1939, Bartolo had one of his rare losses to Jewish boxer Al Reid in an eight round points decision at the Broadway Arena in Brooklyn.

=== Bouts with Maxie Shapiro ===
In their first bout on October 14, 1940, at New York's St. Nicholas Arena, Bartolo drew with Maxie Shapiro in eight rounds. On November 11, 1940, Bartolo defeated New York Jewish boxer Maxie Shapiro in a ten round mixed points decision at the same venue. On January 16, February 3, and February 20, 1942, Shapiro defeated Bartolo in three eight round points decisions at Madison Square Garden, the New York Coliseum, and again in Madision Square Garden. Bartolo had a five pound weight disadvantage in the first and third bouts. Their January 16 bout was an upset, as Bartolo was favored to win the preliminary bout. In their February 3 bout, Bartolo suffered a cut eye in the fifth round, which seemed to affect the quality of his boxing in the remaining rounds. A boxer of considerable achievement, Shapiro defeated five world champions including Bartolo in his career. In their February 20 bout, Bartolo was cut above the eyes, but fought on making an interesting preliminary bout before a crowd of 12,000 at the Garden. On September 28, 1945, Bartolo defeated Shapiro, nearing lightweight status at 130, in a ten round unanimous decision at Boston Garden.

On November 25, 1940, he lost to Joey Fontanna in an eight round points decision at New York's St. Nicholas Arena.

In his first bout with Willie Pep, a non-title match on April 9, 1943, Bartolo lost in a ten round split decision in Boston Garden. Pep was a slight favorite to win the bout.

In his first attempt at a world title, Bartolo lost to Willie Pep for the NYSAC World Featherweight title on June 8, 1943, at the Braves Field in Boston in a fifteen round unanimous points decision. Pep may have had the edge for the last thirteen rounds. He had Bartolo near a knockout in the sixth, but fought quite cautiously in the first two rounds where the fighting seemed even. Pep seemed to stay ahead of Bartolo with his "highly educated left", and effective speed and footwork.

== Taking the NBA World Featherweight Title, March 1944 ==
Known as the "Pride of East Boston", Bartolo took the National Boxing Association (NBA) World Featherweight Title from Phil Terranova in a fifteen round Unanimous Decision before an enthralled crowd of 121,130 at Boston Garden on March 10, 1944. One reporter wrote that "Bartolo's lightning fast left jabbing, his accurate two fisted hooking, and artistic footwork were weapons much too heavy for the dogged Terranova." The United Press gave Bartolo every round except the fourth which seemed even, though Bartolo's frequent left jabs failed to stop the determined Terranova from completing the bout. At the time, Bartolo was serving in the US Maritime Service and stationed at Hoffman Island in Lower New York Bay near Staten Island. He may have received some tips from Benny Leonard who was stationed there as his sergeant at the time.

=== Second NBA Featherweight Title Match with Terranova, May 1944 ===
Bartolo fought his second fifteen round NBA title bout with Terranova at Boston Garden before 7673 fans on May 5. In their rematch, the referee voted for Terranova, but both judges ceded the victory to Bartolo, making it a "split decision". Some sources wrote that Terranova staggered Bartolo in the eleventh round, trying desperately for a knockout, and may have worn himself out for the last four rounds. The United Press scored nine rounds for Bartolo, four for Terranova, with two even. In the first, Bartolo landed with a solid blow to Terranova's mouth which gave him the round by most accounts. The referee had to break the boxers from clinches on several occasions, as Bartolo employed a stand up and box technique, and Terranova employed a great deal of close or infighting.

On July 20, 1943, Terranova took another shot at the USA New England Featherweight Title, winning in an eighth round TKO, defeating Lefty LaChance at the Outdoor Arena in Hartford, Connecticut. The referee stopped the fight when LaChance received a bad cut over his left eye when the two fighters heads crashed together early in the eighth.

=== Two defenses of the World Featherweight Title, Willie Roach, Spider Armstrong, 1944–46 ===
On December 15, 1944, Bartolo waged his second defense of the NBA World Featherweight Title against black boxer Willie Roach at Boston Garden, winning in a fifteen round unanimous points decision before a somewhat modest crowd of 7,000. Bartolo, according to one account won thirteen of the fifteen bouts, but appeared tired by the end of the match, and may have had trouble making weight.

On May 3, 1946, in his last defense of the NBA World Featherweight Title, Bartolo defeated Spider Armstrong before 7,600 fans in a sixth round knockout at Boston Garden. Bartolo employed rapid jabs and left hooks to soften up Armstrong in the early rounds.

=== Loss of the NBA World Featherweight Championship to Willie Pep, June 1946 ===
He lost the championship to Willie Pep on June 7, 1946, at Madison Square Garden via 12th round KO, the last battle of the epic Bartolo-Pep trilogy. A short right hook to the chin caused the knockout that occurred at 2:41 into the twelfth round before an impressive crowd of 10,000. Bartolo took a terrible battering in the ninth round and ended the bout with a broken nose and a gashed lower lip, likely occurring in that round. Later accounts noted that Bartolo had fractured his jaw, likely in the twelfth. The fighting was close and not particularly eventful for the first eight rounds as both boxers approached their opponent with caution. It was considered to be Bartolo's first loss by knockout, though he had lost by TKO in previous bouts.

== Life after boxing ==
Bartolo later owned and managed Ringside Cafe in East Boston for over 30 years. In 1959, his restaurant was investigated as being part of a betting ring and he was investigated for taking bets as a bookie. In 1961, the charge of violating the federal wagering tax law was settled with a fine and a one year probation.

Bartolo later became a court officer for Massachusett's Salem and Peabody courts until his full retirement.

He died on February 19, 2002, and was buried in East Boston. He married twice, once to June Dunbar, and once to Margaret Pastelack, and had four children and several step children.

== Boxing achievements and honors ==
Achievements
Preceded by Phil Terranova	NBA Featherweight Boxing Champion; March 10, 1944 – June 7, 1946	Succeeded by Willie Pep
