= List of Welsh boxing champions =

This list includes all boxers from Wales who have won a recognised British, Commonwealth, European or World title; or a boxer who has won one of the Welsh Area boxing titles.

== World boxing champions ==
This is a list of Welsh people who have become boxing world champions as recognised by the International Boxing Federation (IBF), World Boxing Organization (WBO), World Boxing Association (WBA), World Boxing Council (WBC) or The Ring magazine.

Number	Name	From	Weight	Belt	Duration of reign	Successful defences
1	Percy Jones	Porth	Flyweight	World	Jan 1914	0
2	Freddie Welsh	Pontypridd	Lightweight	World	Jul 1914–May 1917	11 (excluding NWS)
3	Jimmy Wilde	Merthyr Tydfil	Flyweight	World	Dec 1916–Jun 1923	15 (excluding NWS)
4	Howard Winstone	Merthyr Tydfil	Featherweight	World	Jan 1968–Jul 1968	0
5	Steve Robinson	Cardiff	Featherweight	WBO	Apr 1993–Sep 1995	7
6	Robbie Regan	Caerphilly	Bantamweight	WBO	Apr 1996–1996	0
7	Barry Jones	Cardiff	Super-featherweight	WBO	Dec 1997–1998	0
8	Joe Calzaghe	Newbridge	Super-middleweight	WBO	Oct 1997–Sep 2008	21
8	Joe Calzaghe	Newbridge	Super-middleweight	IBF	Mar 2006–Nov 2006	1
8	Joe Calzaghe	Newbridge	Super-middleweight	WBA	Nov 2007–Jun 2008	0
8	Joe Calzaghe	Newbridge	Super-middleweight	WBC	Nov 2007–Jun 2008	0
8	Joe Calzaghe	Newbridge	Super-middleweight	The Ring	Mar 2006–Sep 2008	3
8	Joe Calzaghe	Newbridge	Light-heavyweight	The Ring	Apr 2008–Feb 2009	1
9	Enzo Maccarinelli	Swansea	Cruiserweight	WBO	Sep 2006–Mar 2008	4
10	Gavin Rees	Newbridge	Light-welterweight	WBA	Jul 2007–Mar 2008	0
11	Nathan Cleverly	Cefn Fforest	Light-heavyweight	WBO	May 2011–Aug 2013	4
12	Lee Selby	Barry	Featherweight	IBF	May 2015–May 2018	5
13	Joe Cordina	Cardiff	Super-featherweight	IBF	June -October 2022 and again in April 2023 - present	0
14	Lauren Price	Newport	Welterweight	WBA	May 2024–present	

*NWS: Newspaper Decision

== Commonwealth (British Empire) boxing champions ==
Name	Weight	From	Duration of reign	Successful defences
Jim Driscoll	Featherweight	Cardiff	24 February 1908 – 1913 (relinquished)	0
Johnny Basham	Welterweight	Newport	13 November 1919 – 9 June 1920	1
Jack Petersen	Heavyweight	Cardiff	4 June 1934 - 17 August 1936	4
Tommy Farr	Heavyweight	Tonypandy	15 March 1937 (relinquished)	0
Eddie Thomas	Welterweight	Merthyr Tydfil	27 January 1951 - 16 October 1951	0
Johnny Williams	Heavyweight	Barmouth	11 March 1952 – 12 May 1953	1
Cliff Curvis	Welterweight	Swansea	24 July 1952 – 8 December 1952	1
Dai Dower	Flyweight	Abercynon	19 October 1954 – 30 March 1957	2
Joe Erskine	Heavyweight	Cardiff	17 September 1957 - 3 June 1958	1
Brian Curvis	Welterweight	Swansea	9 May 1960 – September 1966 (relinquished)	7
Eddie Avoth	Heavyweight	Cardiff	23 October 1970 – 24 January 1971	0
Johnny Owen	Bantamweight	Merthyr Tydfil	2 November 1978 – 4 November 1980	2
Colin Jones	Welterweight	Gorseinon	3 March 1981 – 1985 (relinquished)	0
Neil Swain	Super bantamweight	Gilfach Goch	12 April 1995 – 22 March 1997	2
Nicky Piper	Light Heavyweight	Cardiff	30 September 1995 – October 1997 (relinquished)	1
Bradley Pryce	Light Middleweight	Newport	11 March 2006 – 14 March 2009	6
Nathan Cleverly	Light Heavyweight	Caerphilly	10 October 2009 – 10 March 2010	5
Jamie Arthur	Super bantamweight	Cwmbran	16 September 2010 – 5 February 2011	0
Lee Selby	Featherweight	Barry	17 September 2011 – present	2

== European boxing champions ==
Name	Weight	From	Duration of reign	Successful defences
Jim Driscoll	Featherweight	Cardiff	Jun 1912 - > Dec 1919	
Percy Jones	Flyweight	Porth	Jan 1914 - > Mar 1914	
Jimmy Wilde	Lightweight	Merthyr Tydfil	Feb 1916 - Mar 1917	0
Johnny Basham	Welterweight	Newport	Sep 1919 - Jun 1920	0
Johnny Basham	Middleweight	Newport	May 1921 - Oct 1921	0
Eddie Thomas	Welterweight	Merthyr Tydfil	Feb 1951 - Jun 1951	0
Dai Dower	Flyweight	Abercynon	Mar 1955 - Oct 1955	0
Dick Richardson	Heavyweight	Newport	Mar 1960 - Jun 1962	3
Howard Winstone	Featherweight	Merthyr Tydfil	Jan 1968 - Jul 1968	0
Johnny Owen	Bantamweight	Merthyr Tydfil	Feb 1980	0
Colin Jones	Welterweight	Swansea	Nov 1982 - (vacated)	0
Steve Robinson	Featherweight	Cardiff	Dec 1999 - Jun 2000	0
Jason Cook	Lightweight	Maesteg	Aug 2002 - Jan 2003	0
Nathan Cleverly	Light-Heavyweight	Cefn Fforest	Feb 2010 -	0
Enzo Maccarinelli	Cruiserweight	Swansea	Apr 2010 - Sep 2010	0
Gavin Rees	Lightweight	Newbridge	June 2011 -	0

== British boxing champions ==
Name	Weight	From	Duration of reign	Successful defences
Jim Driscoll	Featherweight	Cardiff	May 1906 - Dec 1919	5
Tom Thomas	Middleweight	Penygraig	Oct 1909 - Nov 1910	1
Freddie Welsh	Lightweight	Pontypridd	Nov 1909 - Feb 1911; Nov 1912 -> Dec 1912	0; 1
Bill Beynon	Bantamweight	Taibach	Jun 1913 - Oct 1913	0
Percy Jones	Flyweight	Porth	Jan 1914 - Mar 1914	0
Johnny Basham	Welterweight	Newport	Dec 1914 - Jun 1920	3
Jimmy Wilde	Flyweight	Merthyr Tydfil	Feb 1916 - Feb 1921	1
Johnny Basham	Middleweight	Newport	May 1921 - Oct 1921	0
Gipsy Daniels	Light-heavyweight	Llanelli	Apr 1927 - Feb 1921	0
Frank Moody	Light-heavyweight	Pontypridd	Nov 1927	0
Frank Moody	Middleweight	Pontypridd	Aug 1928 - Sep 1928	0
Jack Petersen	Light-heavyweight	Cardiff	May 1932 - (vacated)	0
Jack Petersen	Heavyweight	Cardiff	Jul 1932 - Nov 1933; Jun 1934 - Aug 1936	2; 3
Tommy Farr	Heavyweight	Tonypandy	Mar 1937 - (vacated)	0
Ronnie James	Lightweight	Swansea	Aug 1944 -	0
Eddie Thomas	Welterweight	Merthyr Tydfil	Nov 1949 - Oct 1951	1
Johnny Williams	Heavyweight	Barmouth	Mar 1952 - May 1953	1
Cliff Curvis	Welterweight	Swansea	Jul 1952 - Dec 1952	0
Dennis Powell	Light-heavyweight	Four Crosses, Powys	Mar 1953 - Oct 1953	0
Dai Dower	Flyweight	Abercynon	Feb 1955 - > Dec 1955	1
Joe Erskine	Heavyweight	Cardiff	Aug 1956 - Jun 1958	2
Brian Curvis	Welterweight	Swansea	Nov 1960 - Feb 1962; Feb 1963 - Sep 1966	2; 2
Howard Winstone	Featherweight	Merthyr Tydfil	May 1961 - Jul 1968	6
Eddie Avoth	Light-heavyweight	Cardiff	Jan 1969 - Jan 1971	1
Pat Thomas	Bantamweight	Cardiff	Dec 1975 - Dec 1976	1
Pat Thomas	Light-Middleweight	Cardiff	Sep 1979 - Mar 1981	2
Johnny Owen	Bantamweight	Merthyr Tydfil	Nov 1977 - 1980	3
Colin Jones	Welterweight	Swansea	Apr 1980 - Apr 1981	1
Neville Meade	Heavyweight	Swansea	Nov 1981 - Sep 1983	0
Kelvin Smart	Flyweight	Caerphilly	Sep 1982 - Jan 1984	0
Steve Sims	Featherweight	Newport	Sep 1982 - Jul 1986	0
David Pearce	Heavyweight	Newport	Sep 1983 - 1985	0
Robert Dickie	Featherweight	Cefneithin	Apr 1986 - Oct 1986	2
Peter Harris	Featherweight	Cefneithin	Feb 1988 - Apr 1988	0
Floyd Havard	Super-featherweight	Swansea	May 1988 - Sep 1989; Mar 1994 - 1996	0; 1
Robert Dickie	Super-featherweight	Cefneithin	Mar 1991 - Apr 1991	0
Robbie Regan	Flyweight	Bargoed	Dec 1991 - > 1996	0
Neil Haddock	Super-featherweight	Llanelli	Oct 1992 - Mar 1994	1
Joe Calzaghe	Super-middleweight	Newbridge	Oct 1995 - Nov 2007	1
Scott Gammer	Heavyweight	Pembroke Dock	Jun 2006 -> Mar 2007	1
Nathan Cleverly	Light-heavyweight	Cefn Fforest	Jul 2009 -> 2011	1
Gavin Rees	Lightweight	Newbridge	Nov 2010	0
Gary Buckland	Super featherweight	Cardiff	Sep 2011–Present	2
Enzo Maccarinelli	Cruiserweight	Swansea	March 2012 – Present	0

== Welsh champions ==
=== flyweight ===
Name	From	Duration of reign	Defences
Johnny Jones	Pentre	20 December 1924 — ?	0
Terence Morgan	Newport	7 April 1928 (relinquished)	0
Phineas John	Pentre	11 August 1928 — 22 July 1929	1
Freddy Morgan	Gilfach Goch	22 July 1929 — 12 July 1930	1
Jerry O'Neill	Merthyr Tydfil	12 July 1930 (relinquished)	0
Freddy Morgan	Gilfach Goch	7 March 1931 — 6 February 1932	0
Bob Fielding	Wrexham	6 February 1932 — ?	0
Billy Hughes	Maesteg	4 March 1933 — 29 July 1933	0
Bobby Morgan	Ammanford	29 July 1933 (relinquished)	0
Jack Kiley	Swansea	7 November 1938 — July 1939	0
Ronnie Bishop	Markham, Caerphilly	10 July 1939 — 13 May 1940	0
Jack Kiley	Swansea	13 May 1940 — ?	0
Billy Davies	Nantyglo	21 April 1947 — 14 June 1948	0
George Sutton	Cardiff	14 June 1948 — 28 March 1949	0
Norman Lewis	Nantymoel	28 March 1949 (relinquished)	0
Glyn David	Caerau	23 August 1950 — 4 October 1951	0
George Sutton	Cardiff	4 October 1951 — ?	0
Maurice O'Sullivan	Cardiff	1972 and 1974 — ?	1
David Afan Jones	Port Talbot	6 February 1989 (relinquished)	0
Robbie Regan	Caerphilly	12 February 1991 — ?	0

=== bantamweight ===
Name	From	Duration of reign	Successful defences
Young Allsopp	Pentre	22 October 1921 — 20 May 1922	0
Albert Colcombe	Tylorstown	20 May 1922 — 7 March 1925	0
Sammy Jones	Gelli	7 March 1925 —> 1 June 1925 (relinquished)	1
Johhny Edmunds	Treharris	20 December 1926 — 9 July 1927	0
Tosh Powell	Aberdare	9 July 1927 — 31 May 1928	2
Dan Dando	Merthyr Tydfil	2 February 1929 — 29 July 1929	0
Cuthbert Taylor	Merthyr Vale	29 July 1929 — 2 September 1929	0
Phineas John	Pentre	2 September 1929 — (relinquished)	0
Stanley Jehu	Maesteg	24 February 1930 — 22 June 1931	1
Terence Morgan	Newport	22 June 1931 — 6 June 1932	0
Len Beynon	Barry, Vale of Glamorgan	6 June 1932 — 4 November 1933	0
George Williams	Treherbert	4 November 1933 — 12 June 1934	0
Len Beynon	Barry, Vale of Glamorgan	12 June 1934 — 24 November 1934	0
Mog Mason	Gilfach Goch	24 November 1934 — 6 February 1936	0
Len Beynon	Barry, Vale of Glamorgan	6 February 1936 (relinquished)	0
Mog Mason	Gilfach Goch	20 October 1937 (relinquished)	0
Norman Lewis	Nantymoel	21 February 1944 (relinquished)	1
Jackie Sutton	Cardiff	28 November 1949 (relinquished)	2
Hughie Thomas	Merthyr Tydfil	26 May 1952 (relinquished)	0
Terry Gale	Cardiff	28 June 1965 — 12 July 1966	1
Gerald Jones	Merthyr Tydfil	12 July 1966 (relinquished)	0
Steve Curtis	Cardiff	2 July 1969 (relinquished)	0
Colin Miles	Cardiff	22 June 1970 — 22 February 1971 (relinquished)	2
Johnny Owen	Merthyr Tydfil	29 March 1977 (relinquished)	1
Glynne Davies	Llanelli	4 October 1979 — 1 October 1980	0
Pip Coleman	Neath	1 October 1980 (relinquished)	0
Ian Turner	Tredegar	2 December 1997 (relinquished)	0

=== super-bantamweight ===
Name	From	Duration of reign	Successful defences
Robert Turley	Cefn Fforest	5 February 2011 —	0

=== featherweight ===
Name	From	Duration of reign	Successful defences
Billy Evans	Merthyr Tydfil	16 March 1929 — 21 September 1929	0
Ginger Jones	Ammanford	21 September 1929 —> 3 September 1932 (relinquished)	5
Stanley Jehu	Maesteg	9 December 1933 — 14 July 1934	0
George Morgan	Pontypridd	14 July 1934 — 25 May 1935	0
Stanley Jehu	Maesteg	25 May 1935 — 8 June 1936	0
Len Beynon	Barry	8 June 1936 —> 24 January 1938 (relinquished)	2
Syd Worgan	Llanharan	11 September 1944 (relinquished)	0
Jackie Hughes	Pontypridd	28 February 1949 —> 23 August 1950 (relinquished)	2
Dai Davies	Skewen	24 September 1951 —> 1 June 1953 (relinquished)	2
Haydn Jones	Tiryberth	16 February 1953 —> 26 October 1953 (relinquished)	2
Lennie Williams	Maesteg	30 June 1964 —> 12 September 1966 (relinquished)	1
Colin Miles	Cardiff	26 March 1974 (relinquished)	0
Les Pickett	Merthyr Tydfil	10 November 1975 —> 17 November 1976	1
Don George	Swansea	19 November 1981 (relinquished)	0
Peter Harris	Swansea	18 November 1986 —> 18 July 1991	0
Steve Robinson	Cardiff	18 July 1991 (relinquished)	0
Peter Harris	Swansea	20 May 1994 (relinquished)	0
David Morris	Cardiff	23 February 1999 (relinquished)	0
Dai Davies	Merthyr Tydfil	5 June 2009 — 30 October 2010	0
Lee Selby	Barry	30 October 2010	0

=== super-featherweight ===
Name	From	Duration of reign	Successful defences
Steve Sims	Newport	25 September 1985 - >23 June 1986	1
Russell Jones	Gilfach Goch	29 October 1986 (vacated)	0
James Hunter	Port Talbot	12 April 1989 - 1 March 1990	0
Andy DeAbreu	Cardiff	1 March 1990 - (vacated)	0
Neil Haddock	Llanelli	11 May 1992 - (vacated)	0
Barrie Kelley	Llanelli	19 January 1993 - 10 November 1993	0
John T Williams	Cwmbran	10 November 1993 - (vacated)	1
Chrissie Williams	Merthyr Tydfil	24 September 1999 - (vacated)	0
Dai Davies	Merthyr Tydfil	8 October 2006 - 12 July 2008	0
Jamie Arthur	Cwmbran	12 July 2008 -	0
Mark Evans	Anglesey	7 June 2013 -	0

=== lightweight ===
Name	From	Duration of reign	Successful defences
Dai Roberts	Caerau, Cardiff	? - 1915	?
Joe Johns	Merthyr Tydfil	22 May 1915 — 22 July 1915	0
Arthur Evans	Terphil	22 July 1915 (relinquished)	0
Billy Fry	Blaenllechau	12 February 1921 (relinquished)	0
Billy Moore	Penycraig	31 March 1924 — 28 November 1925	1
Billy ward	Llwynypia	28 November 1925 — 5 March 1927	0
Edgar Evans	Crumlin	5 March 1927 — 28 July 1928	0
Gordon Cook	Penygraig	28 July 1928 — 22 July 1929	1
Haydn Williams	Waltham Cross	22 July 1929 (relinquished)	0
Gordon Cook	Penygraig	1 February 1930 —> 22 September 1930 (relinquished)	1
Alby Kestrell	Pentre	31 August 1931 — 7 May 1932	0
Billy Quinlan	Ammanford	7 May 1932 — 29 October 1934	2
Boyo Rees	Abercwmboi	29 October 1934 — 11 January 1937	2
George Reynolds	Swansea	11 January 1937 — 4 April 1938	1
Boyo Rees	Abercwmboi	4 April 1938 (relinquished)	0
Warren Kendall	Tonyrefail	7 August 1944 — 16 November 1949	1
Reg Quinlan	Ammanford	16 November 1949 —> 4 December 1950 (relinquished)	1
Selwyn Evans	Newbridge	22 August 1951 — 1 June 1953	2
Dai Davies	Skewen	1 June 1953 (relinquished)	0
Willie Lloyd	Brecon	24 May 1954 — 26 September 1955	0
Emrys Jones	Four Crosses	26 September 1955 (relinquished)	0
Willie Lloyd	Brecon	16 July 1956 (relinquished)	0
Teddy Best	Cardiff	21 August 1957 —> 10 August 1963 (relinquished)	1
Bryn Lewis	Porthcawl	22 May 1968 (relinquished)	0
Martyn Galleozzie	Merthyr Tydfil	13 December 1976 — 15 February 1977	0
Johnny Wall	Merthyr Tydfil	15 February 1977 — 20 March 1978	2
Kelvin Webber	Tonypandy	20 March 1978 — 10 July 1978	0
Martyn Galleozzie	Merthyr Tydfil	10 July 1978 —> 21 September 1978 (relinquished)	1
Ray Hood	Queensferry	4 March 1983 (relinquished)	0
Andy Williams	Garndiffaith	28 April 1986 — 28 October 1987	1
Keith Parry	Swansea	28 October 1987 (relinquished)	0
Mervyn Bennett	Cardiff	27 January 1993 —> 25 October 1995 (relinquished)	1
Damien Owen	Swansea	2 March 2007	0
Craig Woodruff	Newport	23 February 2013 -	0

=== Light welterweight ===
Name	From	Duration of reign	Successful defences
Billy Vivian	Merthyr Tydfil	10 July 1978 - ?	0
Ray Price	Swansea	22 March 1982 - 19 December 1983	0
Geoff Pegler	Swansea	19 December 1983 (relinquished)	0
Michael Harris	Swansea	13 June 1984 (relinquished)	0
David Griffiths	Tremorfa	18 January 1988 - 5 February 1990	1
Jason Cook	Maesteg	11 December 1999 -> 12 June 2000	1
Gary Buckland	Cardiff	3 March 2007 (relinquished)	0
Jason Cook	Maesteg	6 November 2010	0

=== welterweight ===
Name	From	Duration of reign	Successful defences
Fred Dyer	Cardiff	7 July 1913 — 25 August 1913	0
Fred Delaney	Bradford	25 August 1913 (relinquished)	0
Tom Thomas	Deri	26 August 1926 — 21 March 1927	0
Ben Marshall	Newport	21 March 1927 —> 6 October 1928 (relinquished)	3
Billy Fry	Blaenllechau	10 November 1930 — 19 September 1931	0
Danny Evans	Ammanford	19 September 1931 — 19 March 1932	0
Tiger Ellis	Ystradgynlais	19 March 1932 — 30 July 1932	0
Danny Evans	Ammanford	30 July 1932 — 7 July 1934	0
Ivor Pickens	Caerau	7 July 1934 — 20 October 1937	4
Jack Moody	Pontypridd	20 October 1937 — 25 July 1938	0
Johnny Houlston	Cardiff	25 July 1938 (relinquished)	0
Taffy Williams	Swansea	4 December 1939 (relinquished)	0
Gwyn Williams	Pontycymmer	15 January 1945 — 21 September 1948	0
Eddie Thomas	Merthyr Tydfil	21 September 1948 (relinquished)	0
Rees Moore	Maerdy	26 October 1953 — 18 February 1957	2
Les Morgan		18 February 1957 (relinquished)	0
Terry Phillips	Cardiff	29 June 1965 (relinquished)	0
Horace McKenzie	Cardiff	10 July 1978 —> 11 March 1980 (relinquished)	1
Billy Waith	Cardiff	7 June 1982 —> 10 December 1983 (relinquished)	1
Geoff Pegler	Swansea	14 March 1986 (relinquished)	0
John Davies	Ammanford	26 April 1990 (relinquished)	0
Michael Smyth	Barry	24 September 1999 (relinquished)	0
Keith Jones	Cefn Hengoed	15 September 2002 — 23 February 2003	0
Bradley Price	Newport	3 July 2004 (relinquished)	0
Tony Doherty	Pontypool	22 March 2008 (relinquished)	0

=== light middleweight ===
Name	From	Duration of reign	Successful defences
Dave Davies	Bangor	26 March 1974 — 5 March 1977	0
Pat Thomas	Cardiff	5 March 1977 — (relinquished)	0
Gary Pearce	Newport	7 April 1981 — (relinquished)	0
Rocky Feliciello	Rhyl	17 February 1984 — (relinquished)	0
Steve Davies	Pembroke	26 March 1986 — (relinquished)	0
Michael Harris	Swansea	1 March 1989 — (relinquished)	0
Carlo Colarusso	Llanelli	24 January 1991 —> 11 May 1992	1
Paul Samuels	Newport	5 December 1998 —> (relinquished)	0
Taz Jones	Abercynon	21 February 2009 — (relinquished)	0
Barrie Jones	Ferndale	19 November 2011 —	0

=== middleweight ===
Name	From	Duration of reign	Successful defences
Billy Green	Taffs Well	26 August 1926 — 7 December 1929	1
Jerry Daley	Penygraig	7 December 1929 — 30 March 1931	2
Glen Moody	Pontypridd	30 March 1931 —> 6 March 1933 (relinquished)	3
Billy Thomas	Deri	24 January 1934 — 29 April 1935	0
Danny Evans	Ammanford	29 April 1935 (relinquished)	0
Billy Thomas	Deri	11 November 1935 — 24 February 1936	0
Dai Jones	Ammanford	24 February 1936 —> 1 August 1938 (relinquished)	2
Tommy Davies	Cwmgors	31 July 1943 —> 23 May 1949 (relinquished)	4
Ron Cooper	Pyle	11 June 1952 — 20 August 1952	0
Jimmy Roberts	Newbridge	20 August 1952 — 1 December 1952	0
Roy Agland	Tir-y-berth	1 December 1952 (relinquished)	0
Freddie Cross	Abertillery	16 January 1957 — 21 August 1957	0
Phil Edwards	Cardiff	21 August 1957 — 1962 (relinquished)	1
Carl Thomas	Cardiff	27 November 1968 — 1970 (relinquished)	1
Mike McCluskie	Cardiff	27 June 1973 (relinquished)	0
Doug James	Swansea	28 January 1983 (relinquished)	0
Dennis Cronin	Caerphilly	20 January 1987 (relinquished)	0
Wayne Ellis	Cardiff	11 February 1992 —> 14 July 1992 (relinquished)	1
Barry Thorogood	Cardiff	11 February 1992 —> 12 April 1995 (relinquished)	1
Lee Churcher	Newport	19 May 2012 (relinquished)	0
Frankie Borg	Cardiff	27 July 2013 —	0

=== super-middleweight ===
Name	From	Duration of reign	Successful defences
Darron Griffiths	Pontypridd	24 March 1993 -> 5 May 1994	1
Tobias Webb	Swansea	2 March 2013 -	0

=== light heavyweight ===
Name	From	Duration of reign	Successful defences
Randy Jones	Ammanford	11 March 1933 — 22 July 1933	0
Tommy Farr	Tonypandy	22 July 1933 (relinquished)	0
Randy Jones	Ammanford	17 February 1934 (relinquished)	0
Tommy Farr	Tonypandy	14 September 1934 (relinquished)	0
Glen Moody	Tonypandy	27 March 1939 (relinquished)	0
Jack Farr	Abertillery	28 April 1948 - 9 July 1949	1
Dennis Powell	Four Crosses, Powys	9 July 1949 -> 26 November 1949 (relinquished)	1
Ken Rowlands	Mardy	27 April 1953 - 26 August 1953	1
Dave Williams	Barry	26 August 1953 (relinquished)	0
Ken Rowlands	Mardy	10 October 1955 - 7 May 1956	0
Noel Trigg	Newport	7 May 1956 - 23 April 1958	2
Redvers Sangoe	Cardiff	23 April 1958 - 21 March 1960 (relinquished)	2
Derek Richards	Merthyr Tydfil	28 July 1964 - 12 July 1966 (relinquished)	1
Chris Lawson	Cardigan	29 November 1978 - 12 August 1980	2
Kenney Jones	Swansea	12 August 1980 (relinquished)	0
Bonny McKenzie	Cardiff	21 September 1981 (relinquished)	0
Aneurin Williams	Gilwern	27 October 1983 (relinquished)	0
Shon Davies	Llanelli	30 March 2008	0
Jeff Evans	Pontypool	7 May 2011 - 21 July 2012	0
Justyn Hugh	Newport	21 July 2012	0

=== cruiserweight ===
Name	From	Duration of reign	Successful defences
Abner Blackstock		23 May 1986 -	0
Darron Griffiths	Pontypridd	23 February 1999 -	0

=== heavyweight ===
Name	From	Duration of reign	Successful defences
Trevor Llewellyn	Newport	19 August 1922 (relinquished)	0
Tom Norris	Clydach Vale	26 December 1925 — 5 April 1926	1
Dick Power	Risca	5 April 1926 — 3 February 1932	0
Jack Petersen	Cardiff	3 February 1932 (relinquished)	0
Jim Wilde	Swansea	8 June 1935 — 24 September 1936	1
Tommy Farr	Tonypandy	24 September 1936 (relinquished)	0
George James	Cwm	21 February 1938 — 6 August 1949	1
Dennis Powell	Four Crosses, Powys	6 August 1949 — 7 July 1951	0
Tommy Farr	Tonypandy	7 July 1951 (relinquished)	0
Trevor Snell	Cardiff	1953 and retained 1954	
Carl Gizzi	Rhyl	28 June 1965 — 11 October 1971	1
Dennis Avoth	Cardiff	11 October 1971 — 27 June 1973	2
Neville Meade	Swansea	29 March 1976 —> 1 October 1980 (relinquished)	2
David Pearce	Newport	22 September 1983 —> 23 September 1983 (relinquished)	0
Chris Jacobs	Llanelli	29 March 1985 —> 8 June 1989 (relinquished)	1
