= Mervyn Bennett =

Mervyn Bennett may refer to:

- Mervyn Bennett (boxer)
- Mervyn Bennett (equestrian)
