= 1892 in Wales =

- Centuries: 17th; 18th; 19th; 20th; 21st
- Decades: 1870s; 1880s; 1890s; 1900s; 1910s
- See also: List of years in Wales; Timeline of Welsh history 1892 in The United Kingdom Scotland Elsewhere

This article is about the particular significance of the year 1892 to Wales and its people.

== Incumbents ==
- Archdruid of the National Eisteddfod of Wales – Clwydfardd
- Lord Lieutenant of Anglesey – Richard Davies
- Lord Lieutenant of Brecknockshire – Joseph Bailey, 1st Baron Glanusk
- Lord Lieutenant of Caernarvonshire – John Ernest Greaves
- Lord Lieutenant of Cardiganshire – Herbert Davies-Evans
- Lord Lieutenant of Carmarthenshire – John Campbell, 2nd Earl Cawdor
- Lord Lieutenant of Denbighshire – William Cornwallis-West
- Lord Lieutenant of Flintshire – Hugh Robert Hughes
- Lord Lieutenant of Glamorgan – Robert Windsor-Clive, 1st Earl of Plymouth
- Lord Lieutenant of Merionethshire – W. R. M. Wynne
- Lord Lieutenant of Monmouthshire – Henry Somerset, 8th Duke of Beaufort
- Lord Lieutenant of Montgomeryshire – Sir Herbert Williams-Wynn, 7th Baronet
- Lord Lieutenant of Pembrokeshire – William Edwardes, 4th Baron Kensington
- Lord Lieutenant of Radnorshire – Arthur Walsh, 2nd Baron Ormathwaite
- Bishop of Bangor – Daniel Lewis Lloyd
- Bishop of Llandaff – Richard Lewis
- Bishop of St Asaph – Alfred George Edwards
- Bishop of St Davids – Basil Jones

== Events ==
- January – The children's magazine Cymru'r Plant is launched by Owen Morgan Edwards.
- 5 March – St Michael's & All Angels (Anglican) Theological College is founded at Aberdare.
- 30 May – The South Wales Argus, published in Newport, is launched.
- 14 July – Official inauguration of the Liverpool water supply from Lake Vyrnwy. The Vyrnwy dam is the first high masonry gravity dam in Britain.
- 13 September – The Watkin Path up Snowdon is officially opened by William Ewart Gladstone.
- 14 September – The Cardiff water supply from Cantref Reservoir is officially inaugurated by the Mayor of Merthyr Tydfil.
- date unknown
  - J.D. Lewis establishes the Gomer Press at Llandysul.
  - The Parc and Dare Hall in Treorchy opens as a workingmen's institute and library.

== Arts and literature ==
=== Awards ===
National Eisteddfod of Wales – held at Rhyl

- Chair – Evan Jones, "Y Cenhadwr"
- Crown – John John Roberts, "Dewi Sant"

=== New books ===
- D Davies – Patagonia: a description of the country
- Daniel James (Gwyrosydd) – Caniadau Gwyrosydd
- Thomas Gwynn Jones – Eglwys y Dyn Tlawd
- John Richard Williams (J.R. Tryfanwy) – Lloffion yr Amddifad

=== Music ===
- Joseph Parry – Saul of Tarsus (oratorio)
- David Christmas Williams – Traeth Llafar (cantata)

== Sport ==
- Baseball – The Welsh Baseball Union is founded.
- Football – The Welsh Cup is won by Chirk for the fourth time in its 13-year history.
- Golf – The course at Aberdovey is opened.

== Births ==
- 23 March – Jack Whitfield, Wales rugby union captain (died 1927)
- 15 May – Jimmy Wilde, professional boxer (died 1969)
- 12 June – Hilda Vaughan, novelist (died 1985)
- 20 June – Geoffrey Crawshay, soldier and social benefactor (died 1954)
- 25 July – Brigadier Hugh Llewellyn Glyn Hughes, soldier and medical administrator (died 1973)
- 12 August – Jerry Shea, Welsh rugby union and rugby league player (died 1947)
- 18 September – Joe Johns, Welsh lightweight boxing champion (died 1927)
- 12 November – Tudor Davies, operatic tenor (died 1958)
- 19 November – Huw T. Edwards, trade union leader and politician (died 1970)

== Deaths ==
- 13 February – William Davies, palaeontologist, 76
- 5 March – Theophilus Redwood, pharmacist, 85
- 15 March – Mesac Thomas, Anglican bishop in Australia, 75
- 22 April – William Williams, Presbyterian missionary in India, 33 (typhoid)
- 24 April – John Davies (Ossian Gwent), poet, 53
- 27 April – Edward Wingfield Humphreys, Welsh-born New Zealand politician, 50/51
- 6 May – Robert J. Davies, Calvinistic Methodist leader, 52
- 5 June – Robert Rees, singer and musician, 51
- 19 June – Lewis Llewelyn Dillwyn, industrialist and politician, 78
- 3 October – William Davies (Gwilym Teilo), poet and historian, 61
- 26 November – Edward Matthews, minister and author, 79
- 18 December – Richard Owen, anatomist, 88
- 23 December – John Gibson, architect of the Marble Church, Bodelwyddan, 75
- 27 December – Samuel Holland, politician, 89

== See also ==
- 1892 in Ireland
