= Phineas John =

Wales boxer (1910–1985)

Personal information
- Nickname: Smiling Moon
- Nationality: (United Kingdom) British
- Born: Phineas Gladney John Pentre, Wales
- Weight: Flyweight; Bantamweight; Featherweight

Boxing career
- Stance: Orthodox

Boxing record
- Total fights: 242
- Wins: 134
- Win by KO: 15
- Losses: 73
- Draws: 29
- No contests: 6

Phineas Gladney John (1910–1985) was a Welsh professional boxer who fought from 1927 and 1940. John ended his career as a featherweight, but in his early professional bouts, he fought as a flyweight before increasing to bantamweight. Soon after he turned professional John competed for area titles, taking the Welsh flyweight belt in 1928 and then the Welsh bantamweight in 1929. After 1929 John failed to pursue any further titles, but continued fighting across the United Kingdom, ending his career with at least 242 professional fights.

== History ==
Rhondda born Phineas John, turned professional around 1926, fighting local fighters in the Glamorgan area of south Wales, mainly in Bridgend and Pontypridd. Initially a flyweight fighter, one of his first notable fights was a win over Jack Glover in February 1928 at Milford Haven. A month later he was invited to fight at the National Sporting Club in London, losing on points to Dick Manning. He followed this with two fights in Liverpool in April 1928, before returning to Wales to face Minty Rose in an eliminator for the Welsh Area flyweight title. The fifteen round fight went the full distance with John being given the bout on points decision. Despite the fight being an eliminator, when the vacant title was contended on 11 August 1928 at Merthyr Tydfil, his rival was again Minty Rose, the fighter he had defeated to be given the title shot. The fight was scheduled for fifteen rounds and again went the distance, and as before John was given the points decision, making John the Welsh flyweight champion. John completed 1928 with a string of seven fights without defeat.

1929 started with a loss through disqualification to Billy Clarke, before recording seven straight wins, including a victories over Cuthbert Taylor and Bert Kirby, and a successful defence of his flyweight title to Merthyr fighter Jerry O'Neil. During this period, John and his brother Eddie, who was also fighting at flyweight, were classed as the highest ranked fighters in the Welsh Area and a fight for the title was considered between them. The Welsh Boxing Association wrote to the British Boxing Board of Control who decided the fight should not take place. His winning streak was stopped on 22 April 1929, when he faced Jackie Brown at the National Sporting Club. John lost on points to Brown, who later that year would become British flyweight champion. John faced further disappointment that year when he lost his Welsh flyweight title to Freddy Morgan on 22 July.

John responded to his title loss by moving up a weight division to bantamweight. His first bout at his new weight saw him take the Welsh Area bantamweight title from Cuthbert Taylor in a contest on 2 September 1929 at Pontypridd. By 1930 John had moved up the weights again, settling at featherweight. He took on-board manager Ted Broadribb, and in 1931 John moved his family to London and centred his boxing career there. His time fighting out of London was very successful winning 19 out of 25 fights, with only three losses. Of those three losses two were against Benny Sharkey. In April 1932, John travelled to South Africa, where he undertook three fights at City Hall in Johannesburg. He won all three bouts, including a points win over South African featherweight champion Willie Smith and future South African champion, Len McLoughlin. On his return to Great Britain, John fought another six times that year, with patchy results; winning three but losing against Ginger Jones, Seaman Tommy Watson and another defeat at the hands of Benny Sharkey.

In 1933, the News Chronicle and the Sporting Life set up a knockout contest between 16 featherweight contenders, to find a challenger to face British champion Nel Tarleton. The final, contested at Belle Vue in Manchester on 15 May, was between John and Benny Sharkey, the fighter who had beaten John on their previous three fights. Despite their previous form, John won the fight on points and was awarded a handsome gold belt for his achievement. The challenge for the British title against Tarleton didn't occur, as both men were managed by Broadribb and the fight was never on.

In 1934, John again travelled abroad to fight, this time to Australia. John was forced to retire from both his Australian fights, suffering a cut eye against Varias Milling, and then a tenth round retirement, again from an open cut above the eye, against Merv 'Darkie' Blandon. On his return from Australia, John's form suffered, finishing 1934 with losses to Johnny King, Dick Corbett and Cuthbert Taylor. His form didn't recover until 1938 when he lost only four of his seventeen bouts, which saw John defeat the likes of George Marsden and Tommy Hyams.

John continued to box until 1940, ending his career fighting in exhibition boxes for the armed forces. He and his family moved back to Wales in 1946 where he became a founder member of the Welsh ex-Boxers' Association in 1976. John died in 1985.

== Boxing philosophy ==
In a 1977 interview for the BBC, John was involved in a disagreement with fellow Welsh fighter Glen Moody, who believed that a fighter of class would not attack an open wound of an opponent. John disagreed and stated that he would work on the wound to win the fight.

== Bibliography ==
- Lee, Tony (2009). All in My Corner: A tribute to some forgotten Welsh boxing heroes. Ammanford: TL Associates. ISBN 978-0-9564456-0-5.
- Jones, Gareth (2012). The Boxers of Wales: Rhondda. Cardiff: St David's Press. ISBN 978-1-902719-33-7.
