= George Reynolds (boxer) =

Welsh boxer

Personal information
- Nationality: (Wales) Welsh
- Born: Swansea, Wales
- Weight: lightweight

Boxing career

Boxing record
- Total fights: 32
- Wins: 16
- Win by KO: 9
- Losses: 15
- Draws: 1
- No contests: 0

George Reynolds was a professional boxer from Wales. Born in Swansea Reynolds was notable for becoming the Welsh lightweight champion in 1937.

== Boxing career ==
Reynolds' first recorded professional bout is listed against Len Wickwar, a far more experienced fighter from Leicester. The match took place 20 October 1930 at Stourbridge, and although Reynolds was Welsh born, he was now boxing out of Wolverhampton in England, and rarely fought in his home country. Wickwar won on a points decision after the contest went the distance. Reynolds would face Wickwar at least six times throughout his professional career, losing all the encounters, five on points. Reynolds first recorded pro win was over Norman Snow, beating him on 2 November 1930 and then again three weeks later.

On his journey to becoming Welsh lightweight champion Reynolds faced several notable boxers, losing to Welsh Champion Phineas John, losing twice and winning once against British Lightweight Champion George Daly and a points win over Northern-area champion Jimmy Stewart. On 11 November 1937, Reynolds faced Boyo Rees in a challenge for the Welsh lightweight title. The bout, held in Reynolds' hometown of Swansea, was scheduled for fifteen rounds, but was stopped in the tenth when Rees was forced to retire with a cut eye. Between gaining the title and his first title defence Reynolds took in five fights, winning only once. He beat a fairly inexperienced Hal Cartwright, but then lost three straight bouts against Dave Crowley, Lefty Satan Flynn and Jimmy Walsh. This losing streak was only halted by a draw with London journeyman Tommy Hyams.

His first title defence for the Welsh belt was against Glen Evans at Briton Ferry on 9 November 1937; the fight ended in the ninth with Reynolds winning by knockout. He then lost to future British Lightweight champion Eric Boon before beating Northern-area title holder Jack Carrick. Reynolds followed his victory over Carrick with a second Welsh title defence, this time a re-match with Boyo Rees. The match, held at the Pavilion in Mountain Ash on 4 April 1938, went the distance of fifteen rounds, with Reynolds losing the Championship title on points. Reynolds made one more title attempt, this time for the Welsh welterweight title, failing in his bid against Taffy Williams.
