= Chocolate hero =

Chocolate hero or Chocolate boy may refer to:

== As a nickname ==
- Kunchacko Boban (born 1976), Indian Malayalam film actor
- Dino Morea (born 1975), Indian film actor and model
- Waheed Murad (1938–1983), Pakistani film actor
- Lucian Popescu (1912–1982), Romanian boxer

== Other uses ==
- Chocolate Boy (Hey Arnold! character), a fictional character in the TV series Hey Arnold!
- "Chocolate Boy" (Hey Arnold! episode), a 2001 TV episode
- "Chocolate Boy", a song by Guided by Voices from Let's Go Eat the Factory, 2012
