= Jackie Sutton =

Welsh Boxer

Personal information
- Nationality: (United Kingdom) British
- Born: 28 May 1920 Cardiff, Wales
- Died: 13 November 2010 (aged 90)
- Weight: Bantamweight

Boxing career

Boxing record
- Total fights: 26
- Wins: 12
- Win by KO: 5
- Losses: 11
- Draws: 2
- No contests: 1

John Sutton (28 May 1920 – 13 November 2010) was a Welsh boxer who held the Welsh bantamweight title from 1949 to 1951. His brother, George Sutton, also held a Wales boxing belt and his nephew, George Sutton Jr, contested the British Bantamweight title.

== Boxing career ==
Sutton first came to note as a boxer while he was serving with the Royal Air Force during the Second World War. He won amateur awards in India and Canada, and represented the RAF in their first appearance in the United States. On his return to Britain he entered the Welsh Amateur Boxing Association flyweight contest, beating Hughie Thomas - brother of fighter Eddie Thomas - to lift the title. He died in November 2010 at the age of 90.
