= Fred Dyer =

Welsh singer and boxer

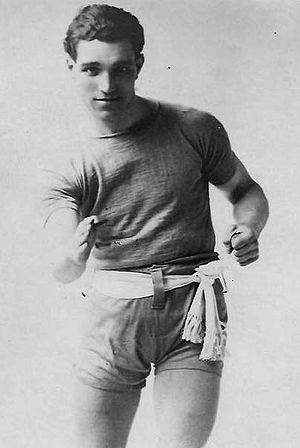

Personal information
- Nicknames: The Singing Boxer, Young Dyer
- Nationality: British
- Born: Frederick William O'Dwyer; 29 April 1888 Cardiff, Wales
- Died: unknown
- Height: 1.73 m (5 ft 8 in)
- Weight: Welterweight

Boxing career

Boxing record
- Total fights: 72
- Wins: 44
- Win by KO: 14
- Losses: 20
- Draws: 6
- No contests: 2

Fred Dyer born Frederick William O'Dwyer (29 April 1888 – date of death unknown), was a Welsh boxing champion, boxing manager and baritone singer. Trained by vocal teacher Clara Novello Davies, Dyer was famed for singing to audiences after he had fought in a contest and was nicknamed 'The Singing Boxer'.

In 1913 Dyer was briefly Wales welterweight champion when he beat Jack Delaney, who won the belt back just six weeks later. During his professional career Dyer took two overseas tours, to Australia from 1914 to 1915 and the United States from 1916 to 1919. Due to the time spent in Australia, he became eligible to contest for national titles, unsuccessfully challenging Les Darcy for the welterweight belt in 1915. The highpoint of his time in America, then during the 'no decision' era, was a win over Panama Joe Gans. Due to a knee injury, Dyer was refused active service during the First World War; instead he was recruited into the United States Army as a boxing instructor.

After retiring from fighting Dyer ran various boxing gyms in London, successfully managing British flyweight champion Bert Kirby. Dyer then became a physical culture coach and was at the forefront of a diet fad in the 1920s based on fruit and vegetable drinks. Little is known of his life after the Second World War and he faded into anonymity.

== History ==
=== Early life ===
Dyer was born in 1888 in Cardiff, Wales to a Welsh mother and Irish father. Dyer's mother came from a musical background and was a member of the Royal Welsh Glee, while his father was a bare knuckle boxer. Dyer showed promise as a baritone singer and was trained by Clara Novello Davies, mother of Ivor Novello. He was also an impressive sportsman, as a swimmer and, like his father, a boxer; but his family's poverty decreed that he took up boxing over his singing to provide an income. Dyer fought in the travelling show booths for quick money, but when this was discovered by the amateur boxing association, it led to him being stripped of his amateur status, which in turn saw his hopes of competing at the 1908 Summer Olympics in boxing and in swimming dashed.

=== Professional career ===
==== Welsh title ====
Dyer turned professional in either 1909 or 1910. Boxrec record his first fight in July 1909 against Jack Delaney, a boxer who Dyer would challenge in 1913 for the Wales welterweight title. Boxing magazine reported in January 1910 that his fight against future British and European welterweight champion Johnny Basham was Dyer's debut fight. Both fights are recorded as victories for Dyer, but the fight against Basham, held in Newport on New Year's Day 1910, was reportedly held back too late at night to allow Dyer to fulfill matinee and evening singer engagements in Stoll's Panopticon in St. Mary's Street, Cardiff.

Dyer was a popular choice with boxing promoters, helped by the fact that after each bout he would sing Thora, a popular hit of the day to the audience. His careers as a pugilist and baritone earned him the nickname, 'The Singing Boxer'. His first few bouts were all held in south Wales, but by the autumn of 1910 he was travelling to England to fight, and on 10 October 1910 he was invited to fight at the National Sporting Club in Covent Garden, London. On 15 May 1911 Dyer was scheduled to fight Dick Emden at The Ring in Blackfriars, London. To date, Dyer had recorded over 15 bouts and was unbeaten but the fight with Emden ended in defeat and affected his future boxing career. Dyer was easily ahead in the bout, when in the fifth round he dislocated his knee and fell to the canvas in agony. Emden, who taunted the fallen Dyer, was given the victory and Dyer would not fight for another six months. The injury to his right knee plagued Dyer throughout his entire boxing career, and also stopped him serving in the armed forces during the First World War. After the injury, Dyer always fought with a protector strapped around his knee, and was forced to change his fighting style. He would always stand on the toes of his right foot, as a quick back step could possibly dislocate his knee again. His return bout in November 1911 was a win against Young Lilley at The Ring, but this was again followed by a long absence. Dyer did not fight again until 1 June 1912.

On 7 July 1913 Dyer faced Jack Delaney for the vacant Wales Area Welterweight title, despite Delaney being English. The fight was staged at the Skating Rink on Westgate Street in Cardiff and was scheduled for 20 rounds. The fight went the distance and Dyer was awarded the bout on points decision, making him the Welsh welterweight champion. He held the title for just over a month when a rematch for the title ended in victory for Delaney. Despite the loss, a win over Gus Platts—who would later become British and European middleweight champion—in October resulted in Dyer being touted as one of the preferred challengers to the British welterweight champion Johnny Summers. Summers though had travelled to Australia to extend his boxing campaign, and in the spring of 1914 Dyer decided to follow him abroad to challenge for his title. Dyer stopped off en route in South Africa to play music halls in a bid to help pay his fares. Dyer entertained with a mixture of songs and shadow boxing, and challenged all-comers to fight with him at the end of the show. Unfortunately for Dyer, by the time he reached Australia, Summers had already returned to Britain.

==== Australia ====
Despite missing Summers, Dyer decided that the trip to Australia should not be wasted and began his own campaign. As in Britain, his note as a singer preceded him, and at several venues he would sing as well as box. His first fight, in May 1914, was at the Athletic Pavilion in Melbourne against Knucker Pearce. The six round fight went the distance in Dyer's favour. On 17 October 1914 he easily beat Sol Jones in a 20-round fight that went the distance, which was followed by a contest with American fighter Fritz Holland. Holland had arrived in Australia in 1914, and had already beaten English fighter Tom McCormick and local wonderkid Les Darcy. The fight with Holland took place at Baker's Stadium, where Dyer had beaten Jones just the month before. The 20 round contest went the full distance, but when the referee declared the fight a draw there was uproar from the spectators who considered Dyer the winner. This was backed up by press representatives who had scored 16 of the rounds in favour of Dyer. Dyer's display against Holland brought about a contest with Les Darcy, the "Maitland Wonder". After their first contest was delayed when Darcy was detained in quarantine in Sydney, a contest was arranged for Boxing Day at Baker's Stadium. At the start of the fight, Darcy weighed in at 11 st 1 lb, while Dyer's weight was not announced beforehand, but in the after-fight weighing, it was recorded as 10 st 2 lbs. (Note: Although it is reported in some publications (Jones 2009), that Dyer was giving away nearly a stone in weight, Dyer's recorded weight was taken after the fight of 20 3-minute rounds and Dyer would have lost weight during the fight (4lbs is estimated by the Brisbane Courier at the time). This would still have given Darcy a significant weight advantage of roughly seven pounds.) Before the bout Dyer was sporting a black-eye sustained in sparring and his knee strapped, which he always did after his dislocating the knee in 1911. Darcy started the fight in a flurry in an attempt to finish the contest quickly, but after little gain both fighters settled into a more evenly paced bout. The contest went the distance and the referee gave the victory to Darcy, which was seen as a fair result.

While in Australia, as in South Africa, Dyer attempted to supplement his boxing income by arranging singing contracts at music halls and theatres, though his attempts to find work at the Tivoli Theatre in Sydney were unsuccessful. During his time in Australia Dyer was involved in exhibition work and was one of the boxers present at the opening of a new stadium at the Broadmeadows Training Camp for soldiers in Melbourne. Dyer's attempts to continue his boxing career stumbled during this period. A match was arranged with local butcher Jimmy McNabb, but McNabb then switched his fight to face Holland instead, though Holland's team promised to give Dyer a fight with fellow American Jimmy Fitton, but that too fell through. A further fight was arranged with Belgian fighter Henri Demlen, but an injury to Demlen ending the encounter. In March 1915 Dyer put his boxing on temporary hold and spent some time in New Zealand, performing on the Brennan-Fuller vaudeville circuit. Eventually a bout was secured with Victoria middleweight champion Ed Williams, and the two met at the newly built West Melbourne Stadium on 29 May 1915. Despite being the lighter boxer, Dyer outpointed Williams from the fourth round of the fight and won by knockout in the ninth.

Just a week after defeating Williams, a rematch was announced between Dyer and Holland. The fight venue was Rushcutters Bay Stadium in Sydney and both fighters turned out for a training exhibition in the build-up to the contest. The contest, held on 5 June 1915, was watched by a crowd of 2,000 spectators. The fight went the full distance and in the closing rounds Holland, realising that his only chance of victory was a knockout, attacked Dyer ferociously, staggering the Welshman in the 19th. Despite the late assault, Dyer stayed on his feet and was announced the winner by the referee.

After the Holland fight, Dyer made several attempts at a rematch with Darcy, reportedly to the exclusion of other fights, in the belief that the encounter would draw a big crowd and a large purse. The postponed fight with Delmen was again mooted, but this too never occurred. In the meantime Dyer continued to busy himself with charity work, setting up a boxing fund for injured soldiers in Sydney, and continued to tour the vaudeville circuit in New South Wales. Dyer's persistence eventually paid off, and an encounter with Darcy was arranged for 9 October at Rushcutters Bay Stadium, with the Middleweight Championship title at stake. The fight was a one-sided affair, with Dyer outclassed throughout. Although Darcy was warned for a low blow in the fourth round, Dyer was never in the fight and his corner threw in the towel after one minute of the sixth round.

Dyer's final fight in Australia was a challenge for the Australian Welterweight title, held by Melbourne fighter Fred Kay. Due to the fact that Dyer had been a resident in Australia for over a year he was now allowed to challenge for the Australian belts. The fight was held on 6 November 1915 and was scheduled for 20 rounds. Initially it appeared that Dyer would win the title comfortably, out-scoring the champion for most of the early rounds. Dyer then connected cleanly with Kay's nose at the start of the eighth, putting Kay down for a count of eight. When Kay rose he was bloodied and spent much of the round in defence, but by the ninth Kay had recovered and was now the aggressor. In the eleventh round Kay caught Dyer with a powerful body shot that put him down for the count. Dyer's corner called a foul blow, but the ring doctor could find no evidence and Kay retained his belt.

==== United States ====
By the end of 1915 Dyer was through with Australia, the New Zealand Truth reporting that he had left by 4 December, and by Christmas Eve the American press were already announcing his arrival in the States. In January, Dyer was in San Francisco, where he fought local boxer Bob McAllister, losing on points in a four-round contest. He then travelled to the East Coast and to New York, and on 6 May 1916 he was back in the ring, in a ten-round fight with local boxer Tommy Maloney. The fight went the distance ending in a draw, though local newspapers gave the decision to Maloney. (Note: During this period of American boxing, in most states, only fights which ended before the full distance were given a decision on the night: knockout, technical knockout, retirement or no contest. Any fight that ended with all rounds being fought was declared a draw and no further decision was made by the referee. The ultimate decisions of these drawn fights (win, loss or draw) were declared by the sports pages, whose results are historically accepted.) After the fight Dyer entertained the crowd with an operatic song.

Dyer continued to box regularly in New York State losing to Frankie Notter in June and then recording a draw with George Ashe in July. (Note: The New York Evening Telegram (Paul Zabala) gave the decision to Ashe while the Brooklyn Daily Eagle reported a win for Dyer.) Dyer appears to have forgone fighting for over a year, but then returned to the ring in July 1917, both contests held at the Rochester Airdome. He was given his first win since arriving in America in his encounter with Willie Langford but this was followed by another loss, this time to Bryan Downey. On 28 September 1917, Dyer fought in Boston, Massachusetts, facing local fighter Tommy Robson, in which the referee declared a draw. His next fight, against Frankie Maguire in Pennsylvania, was given to Dyer by the Philadelphia Record after the fight went the distance. Dyer's next fight was against Lew Williams, which was given to Williams by the New York Evening Telegram, though The New York Sun believed Dyer shaded the match with more precise punching.

On 3 November 1917, A fight with Panama Joe Gans was arranged. The fight was held at the Clermont Avenue Rink in Brooklyn, location of his last two contests, the loss to Williams and then a win over Young Battling Nelson. Dyer easily outpointed Gans and was awarded the decision by several New York papers. The win over Gans caused some members of the press to talk of Dyer as a challenger for welterweight title holder Ted "Kid" Lewis, the London boxer who was then based in America. A match was made but Lewis injured a finger and the match was called off. By the time Lewis was fit he had lost his title to Jack Britton, and Britton was not interested in fighting Dyer. Dyer fought twice more in New York in 1917, avoiding the newspaper decisions with a knockout win over Kid Queens and then a technical knockout of Kid Carter.

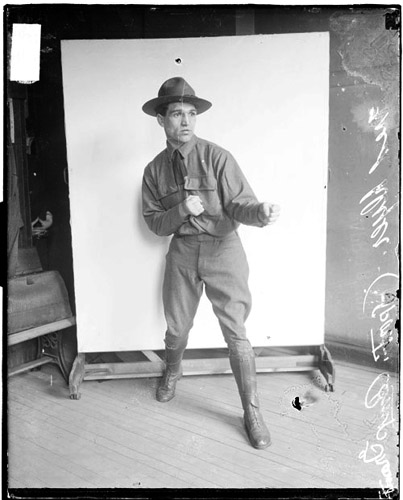
Dyer in military uniform during his time at Camp Grant

In late 1917 Dyer faced Tommy Robson again in two encounters in Massachusetts. The first, fought in Boston, was a disputed result after the bout went the distance, though it is recorded as a win for Robson. The second match, at Cuddy's Arena in Lawrence, was intended to be between Robson and Ted Lewis, but when Lewis could not fight, Dyer stepped in. This second bout also ended in a newspaper decision for Robson. Despite fighting for twelve rounds against Robson, Dyer entertained the crowd after the fight by playing his ukulele and singing popular songs. As in Australia, Dyer continued to appear at charity events in aid of the war effort. In January 1918 he appeared as part of a fundraiser for the basketball team The Newark Elks, who had several players fighting in Europe. Headlining the bill was world boxing champion Benny Leonard.

On 1 February 1918 Dyer was awarded a points victory over Frankie Mack in Boston, which he followed up with another win this time over Terry Brooks. At the start of the Brooks fight, as Dyer was getting into the ring, he was handed a telegram informing him that he had been appointed as a boxing instructor for the National Army. Dyer had been refused admission into the British and American Armies on account of the broken cartilage in his right knee. Dyer was eventually based at Camp Grant in Illinois, but fought one more bout, a win over Walter Butler of Boston before beginning his commission. Dyer did not fight outside the armed forces during the rest of the war, but he proved successful in his role as camp boxing instructor with Camp Grant performing well in boxing tournaments. Dyer also continued his charity work, singing and boxing in front of the public and the armed forces.

With the end of the war, Dyer returned to civilian life. His first fight outside the army was against local boxer Tommy Ferguson at the Town Hall in Scranton, Pennsylvania. The Scranton Times gave the decision to Ferguson, though the Evening Public Ledger gave every round to Dyer. Just a day later this was followed by a decisive loss to Eddie Trembley in Jersey City. Dyer then finished with his third fight within the week by facing Joe Egan on 18 February, a late substitute for Paul Doyle. Dyer lost by points decision.

After defeating Young Battling Nelson again, in a rematch set in Binghamton, Dyer lost on points a week later to Wisconsin fighter Pal Reed. He continued to appear at charity contests in the early half of 1919, mainly for the Boxers' Loyalty League, sparring with the likes of Tim Healy and Silas Green. By now Dyer's vaudeville bookings were far outnumbering his boxing appearances and in the latter half of 1919 he faced only a handful of opponents in paid boxing matches. These included a newspaper decision loss to Steve Latzo in May and a win over Johnny Evans in New Jersey in July. Between August and September Dyer was part of a touring boxing show organised by the Knights of Columbus, fighting for the entertainment of returned and injured soldiers. Dyer fought a few more professional bouts in America, a draw and a loss to Joe Egan and a newspaper decision win over Jimmy Gray, but by 1920 Dyer had left the country and had returned to Europe.

==== Career end ====
When Dyer returned to Europe he initially travelled to France, where he sang and played to theatres in Paris. Only one boxing match is recorded during his time there, against middleweight Jean Audouy. Before the fight Dyer was advised by a doctor not to wear his strapping he had used to support his injured left leg, but in the seventh round his leg gave way again and Audouy was declared the winner. Just a week before his encounter with Audouy, Ted Lewis had regained his British middleweight title but Dyer's reoccurring injury now ruled out any encounter between the fighters.

By July Dyer was back in Britain and was fit enough to re-enter the ring, stopping Nicol Brady via technical knockout in a contest in Wallsend. He followed this with a points decision over Jack Zimmer and then won through Will Brooks' disqualification in a contest held in Cardiff. In November 1920 Dyer was invited to the National Sporting Club in London to face 'Bermondsey' Billy Wells. During the bout the referee twice instructed both men to make a proper contest of the fight. The referee let the match go the full fifteen rounds and then, instead of declaring a winner, he called the fight a 'no contest', with the fighters' purse being given to charity. After the National Sporting Club debacle, Dyer turned more and more to his singing and very few fights are recorded after 1920. A fight against Jim Slater in January 1922 is believed to be his last bout. (Note: BoxRec, although an incomplete source, states "Apparently this was Dyer's last fight. He spent most of his time on stage, and boxing seems to have never been more than sideline for him")

=== Later life ===
After retiring from boxing, a decision forced on him by his ailing knee, Dyer focused on his theatre appearances. His voice though, was not as it once was, and he strained to reach the higher notes of his range and bookings began to dry up. Dyer then refocussed on boxing, but this time as a manager. In the 1920s he moved to London, where he set himself up as a physical culture expert and ran a small stable of fighters. The three fighters training under him were Bristolians George Rose and Reggie Hobbs and most notably Bert Kirby from Birmingham. Kirby went on to become the British flyweight champion when he took the title from Jackie Brown in 1930. Dyer also ran a gym for gentleman on the Strand, which was used by fighters such as Bantamweight champion Teddy Baldock and American Packey McFarland who Dyer faced when the two men were boxing instructors in the US Army. The gym was later demolished to make way for a new hotel and Dyer was forced to find a new location.

Dyer took his role as a physical culture expert very seriously and insisted on managing the diet of his boxers. He was also at the forefront of a fad in the mid-1920s which was based on a diet of fruit and vegetable drinks, a lifestyle choice that he believed could cure all illnesses. Dyer continued in his career as a physical culture expert into the next decade and was still working out of London in that capacity in 1939.

Dyer slowly slipped into obscurity, and his dealings after London, including his place and date of death, are unknown.

== Boxing record ==
As there is no definitive date of when Dyer turned professional and many fights in the early 20th century were poorly recorded, the boxing record associated with Dyer is incomplete. His total bouts and results presently stand, as listed by Boxrec, as 72 fights, of which 44 were wins (14 by knockout), 20 losses (4 by knockout), 6 draws and 2 'no contests'. It is accepted that this list is incomplete and more bouts could be added in future, or changed.

One commonly held misconception connected to Dyer is that he holds the second longest unbeaten record of fights of any boxer in world history, after fellow Welsh fighter Jimmy Wilde. This information was published in Nat Fleischer's The Ring: Record Book And Boxing Encyclopedia, in which it states Dyer fought 94 unbeaten fights between 1908 and 1912. Although it could be argued that Dyer may have boxed 94 fights between these years, and may have turned professional in 1908, it is widely accepted that his fight with Dick Emden in 1911 in which he dislocated his knee was a loss. This therefore challenges Fleischer's claim.
