= Johnny Houlston =

Welsh boxer (1917–1962)

Personal information
- Nationality: Welsh
- Born: John Patrick Houlston; 21 June 1917 Cardiff, Wales
- Died: 5 June 1962, (age 44) Llanwern, Wales
- Weight: Middleweight, Welterweight

Boxing career

Boxing record
- Total fights: 43
- Wins: 27
- Win by KO: 1
- Losses: 10
- Draws: 6
- No contests: 0

Johnny Houlston (1917–1962) was a Welsh welterweight and middleweight boxer. Houlston was Wales welterweight champion from 1938 until he relinquished the belt with the outbreak of the Second World War in 1939. Houlston decision to join the Merchant Navy in 1939 resulted in him engaging in no professional bouts until he left the service in 1946. On his return to professional boxing after the war, Houlston switched to middleweight and made one unsuccessful attempt at the Welsh title. His boxing career lasted from 1935 to 1949. He was predicted to be a World Middleweight Champion before the war.

== Career history ==
Houlston was born in Cardiff in 1917 and was one of eleven children. He grew up in Nora Street in the district of Splott. Houlston took to boxing as a youth, winning three British school titles. He turned professional in 1935, after he controversially lost the Welsh Amateur Boxing Association final on points to local rival, Albert Barnes. Houlston was an elusive fighter with a good left punch and strong defensive skills. Of his 27 winning fights only one failed to go the full distance, showing an inability to finish opponents through heavy punching.

=== Welterweight ===
Houlston took Fred Yates as his manager and trained under Ernie Hurford. His first recorded professional fight was against Douglas Lewis on 10 August 1935 at the Labour Stadium in Merthyr. The six round fight went the full distance with the referee giving the decision to Lewis. He fought at least another three times in 1935, winning all three on points. Houlston continued his winning streak into 1936, with victories over Eddie Cullen of Ynysddu and Tommy Davies of Tylorstown, both held at the Market Hall in Caerphilly. His win over Davies was the first of four known fights he undertook in May 1936, all wins. He continued his punishing schedule with another four contests in August, with only a draw against Norman Rees of Abercwmboi spoiling a perfect start to the year. Houlston finished the year with wins over Joe Thomas and Percy Enoch, before recording a draw with Les Greenaway at the King's Theatre in Cardiff.

To this point Houlston has conducted all his fights in south Wales, and all against local fighters, working his way through the available Welsh welterweights. He continued this strategy through 1937, with three wins and a draw. With twenty bouts behind him, and just one loss in his opening fight, Houlston was placing himself into contention for a shot at the Wales Welterweight Championship title. A win over Curly Edwards at Pillgwelly Social Club in Newport in March 1938 set up a title eliminator with Mog Gwilliam of Pencoed. The fifteen round bout was scheduled for 3 May at the Mannesman Hall in Swansea. Gwilliam was the more experienced fighter, but came into the fight with two losses in the last three months. The fight went the full distance and the referee gave the decision to Houlston, setting up a challenge for the Wales welterweight title, held by Jack Moody of Pontypridd. Before he faced Moody, Houlston was on the card to face newly crowned Irish Welterweight champion Paddy Roche at Somerton Park in Newport. 3,500 spectators turned out to watch the match, which resulted in a win for Houlston on points. Houlston and Moody met on 25 July at the Pill Athletic Ground in Newport. Again Houlston took his opponent the full distance and again he was awarded the points decision, making him the Wales Weltereight Champion.

With the Welsh title came greater recognition and Houlston was now in demand by promoters in England. In August he beat Johnny Lafferty in Liverpool and followed this with a win over Jack Morgan in Newport. Houlston then lost to George Odwell in Gloucester, the match being stopped in the eighth by the referee. Houlston recovered from this loss with a draw and then a winning rematch encounter with Southern area champion Norman Snow. He then finished the year with a loss to Harry Craster at Earls Court in London.

Houlston has just one recorded fight in 1939, a points loss to Lefty Satan Flynn. With the outbreak of the Second World War, Houlston relinquished his Welsh title and joined the war effort. If he had joined the Army or Navy his boxing career would have probably continued, as the forces organised their own boxing clubs. Instead Houlston followed his brother into the Merchant Navy and was unable to fight in organised bouts. This led to seven years without a professional fight and during this period also developed a drink problem.

=== Middleweight ===
On his return to the sport in 1946, Houlston was now fighting at middleweight. He lost his first encounter to Tommy Jones of Derby, but then beat Tommy Davies, the Wales middleweight champion in a non-title encounter. He finished the year losing to future British Light-heavyweight Champion, Alex Buxton. Having shown that he had the ability to stop the Welsh champion Davies, Houlston set his sights on winning a second Wales title. In 1947 he beat both Norman Jones and Des Jones in title eliminator contests to set up a return meeting with Davies, this time for the middleweight belt. Before facing Davies, Houlsten fought Johnny Williams, the result was a draw.

On 12 January 1948, Houlston and Davies met at the Glyn Hall in Neath. The 15 round bout went the distance and the decision went with the champion, Davies. Houlston continued to chase the middleweight title, and beat Koffi Kiteman just two weeks later, but after being knocked-out by Des Jones in a middleweight title eliminator his dreams of a second belt appeared slight. After suffering a technical knockout defeat to Alby Hollister in West Ham on 15 February 1949, Houlston decided to retire from boxing.

== Later life ==
Houlston returned to Cardiff, living in the same district he grew up in. He was a regular at the Clifton, a public house on the corner of Clifton Street and Broadway. He was known to entertain drinkers by inviting them to hit him in the head while he remained stood on a handkerchief to show his dodging skills. He worked at the Llanwern steelworks in Newport, and in 1962 he collapsed and died at work from a heart attack. He was 45.

== Bibliography ==
- Jones, Gareth (2009). The Boxers of Wales: Cardiff. Cardiff: St David's Press. ISBN 978-1-902719-26-9.
- Lee, Tony (2009). All in My Corner: A tribute to some forgotten Welsh boxing heroes. Ammanford: TL Associates. ISBN 978-0-9564456-0-5.
