= Tommy Davies =

Welsh boxer

Personal information
- Nationality: Welsh
- Born: Thomas Glanville Davies; 7 May 1920 Cwmgors, Wales
- Died: December 1988 (aged 68)
- Height: 5 ft 10 in (1.78 m)
- Weight: Middleweight

Boxing career
- Stance: Orthodox

Boxing record
- Total fights: 82
- Wins: 50
- Win by KO: 27
- Losses: 26
- Draws: 6
- No contests: 0

Thomas Glanville Davies (7 May 1920 – 16 December 1998) was a Welsh Middleweight boxer. Davies was Wales middleweight champion from 1943 until his retirement in 1949. He successfully defended his title on four occasions. Davies was considered a serious contender for the British Middleweight title, but a string of three fights against Vince Hawkins during 1944 robbed him of his chance of a title fight.

== Personal history ==
Davies was born in Cwmgors in 1920 to John and Edith Davies. He was one of twelve children. On leaving school, Davies took employment at the local coal mine, and despite his boxing career, remained in employment at the mine for his whole working life.

Davies took up boxing at the age of sixteen, though he never fought any amateur bouts. He turned professional at eighteen, facing his first opponent, Martin Fury, on 6 June 1938. The fight, held at the Market Hall in Carmarthen, went the full six rounds, and Davies was given a points decision by the referee. His second fight was a loss, to Crad Rule, the brother of his trainer Archie Rule, but his remaining five fights of 1938 were all wins. Under the management of ex-professional fighter Johnny Vaughan, Davies continued his success with five wins in 1939, all taking place in south Wales. He mainly fought in Ammanford or Swansea.

Due to working in a reserved occupation, Davies was not conscripted into the British Forces after the outbreak of World War II. He fought three times in 1940, a knockout win over Billy Evans, a points loss to future British and Commonwealth Champion Dick Turpin and a technical knockout over Ivor Pickens. A newspaper report following his defeat of Pickens, who was once the Wales Welterweight Champion, proclaimed that Davies was a Welsh belt contender. Davies fought another four fights in 1941, winning three my knockout, but losing to Billy Jones of Cwmparc on a points decision. He began 1942 with a rematch against Jones, but the result was the same, a points loss. He followed this loss with a string of three wins, knockouts over Billy "Kid" Andrews and Trevor Burt, and then a disqualification decision over Jimmy Moore in Davies' first fight outside Wales, at the Stadium in Liverpool. On 3 August 1942 Davies faced Battersea boxer Dave McCleave, who the previous year had won the British South Area light heavyweight title and as an amateur won the Empire Games welterweight gold medal. McCleave won on a points decision. Davies then won a string of five victories before closing the year with a draw against Fulham based Harry Watson and a points loss to Frank Duffy at the Stadium in Liverpool.

From 1943 Davies was offered more and more fights in England. He faced Gilbert Messenger in Malvern, then Pat O'Connor at the Queensbury Club in Soho, London. He then took on and won three fights in June 1943; beating Jock McCusker at the Drill Hall, Bridgend, Trevor Burt at the Cardiff Arms Park and Lefty Satan Flynn at Willenhall in the Midlands. This led to a contest with Ernie Roderick, the British Welterweight Champion, in a non-title fight. Although Davies lost on points, he put up a credible fight. The win over Flynn and his performance against Roderick, lifted Davies' boxing profile. Vaughan and Rule recognised this, and the possible Wales welterweight title, which had been available for Davies to challenge for some time, was brought to the front. A contest was arranged for the Wales title between Davies and Merthyr fighter Tommy Smith, to be held on 31 July 1943 at St Helens in Swansea. A crowd of 8,000 turned up to watch the title fight, which was a one-sided affair, the referee stopped the contest in the sixth after Smith took eight counts in that round. Davies was now the Wales area welterweight champion, and although he would not defend it for another three years, it attracted higher calibre fights.

Davies next faced George Odwell, taking a points decision in an eight-round fight in Dudley. He then undertook a string of six fights against fighters he had faced in the past. Three were points wins against Lefty Flynn, at Willenhall, the Royal Albert Hall and the Queensbury Club. Two were facing Pat O'Connor, who retired in their first meeting, but managed a draw in their second encounter. His other fight was against Frank Duffy, in which Davies took revenge over the Liverpudlian by beating his opponent on points.

In March 1944, a contest was arranged between Davies and Eastleigh boxer Vince Hawkins. To that date Hawkins was unbeaten over 40 fights and was seen as a favourite to challenge for the British title. He had steadily been working through the other contenders and on 20 March Davies and Hawkins met in Birmingham in a match that would bolster the winner's claim for a title shot. The ten round bout went the distance with the referee judging the contest a draw. Boxing News reported that the draw 'flattered' Davies, but Davies, in an interview in 1989, stated that he believed he had out-boxed Hawkins in that encounter.

Davies was back at the Queensbury Club in Soho exactly a month later, with another fight against welterweight champion Ernie Roderick. Again Roderick took Davies the full distance and was again awarded the decision. Just four days later Davies was in Wolverhampton, where he stopped Charlie Knock via technical knockout in the eighth round. Then on 26 April, two days after the Knock fight, Davies was back in London, at the Royal Albert Hall for a return bout against Hawkins. The eight round fight went the distance, and this time the referee gave Hawkins the decision. The fight was close enough for a second rematch to be arranged with Davies' corner claiming their fighter was tired after the recent two fights. Davies still believed he was a contender for the middleweight title. It took three months for the return bout to take place, and although not billed as a contender eliminator, for Davies a loss would affect his claim at a title shot. The fight took place on 17 July 1943 in Birmingham, and the fight again went the full distance, and again the decision went to Hawkins. Davies didn't fight again until December, when he beat Johnny Clements at Willenhall. He then started 1945 poorly, losing for the first time to 'Satan' Flynn on their fifth encounter, at the Alexandra Theatre in Stoke Newington on New Year's Day. That January Davies married his partner Phyllis.

After a win against Frankie Jackson in February, Davies found himself being mentioned again as a contender for the British Middleweight title. The current holder, Jock McAvoy had relinquished the belt, so the British Boxing Board of Control sanctioned two eliminator fights to decide who would challenge for the vacant title. The first was to be between Hawkins and Roderick, while the second would see Davies face Bert Gilroy. While the fights were being arranged, Davies fought twice more: Another close loss to Roderick, and a win over George Howard in Soho. With the eliminators looming, news came through that Gilroy was unable to make the weight in time. The Board decided not to find another opponent for Davies, and decided that the eliminator between Hawkins and Roderick would decide the Championship. Davies' title hopes were over.

The second half of 1945 resulted in Davies' worst period of his professional career. Davies lost to Howard on points in June after he had stopped him in four rounds two months earlier. He then lost to Irishman Jimmy Ingle and followed this with a defeat to ex-champion Jock McAvoy at the Vetch Field in Swansea. He finished the year with one of the biggest matches of his career when a fight was arranged with the European Champion Marcel Cerdan. The fight was held at Palais des Sports in Paris, the first time Davies had fought abroad. The bout held another first for Davies, the first time he had suffered a loss by knockout. Davies lasted less than two minutes of the first round.

Davies' career after the Cerdan fight was chequered. From 1946 through to 1951, he successfully defended his Welsh Middleweight title on four occasions, showing that he was still the best Welsh fighter in his division. He stopped Taffy Williams in just four rounds in 1946, took a points decision over 15 rounds against Johnny Houlston in 1948, a win via technical knockout over Ron Cooper also in 1948 and a win against Des Jones in 1949. All his opponents, apart from Des Jones, would hold a Welsh title during their career. Other notable fighters during his final professional years included loses to two of the Turpin brothers; Dick Turpin stopped him in the fifth round in 1947 July, while Randy Turpin knocked Davies out in the second round three months earlier. Davies' final recorded fight was against South African Doug Miller on 19 February 1951.

== Bibliography ==
- Lee, Tony (2009). All in My Corner: A tribute to some forgotten Welsh boxing heroes. Ammanford: TL Associates. ISBN 978-0-9564456-0-5.
- Stead, Peter; Williams, Gareth, eds. (2008). Wales and its Boxers, The Fighting Tradition. Cardiff: University of Wales Press. ISBN 978-0-7083-1915-4.
