= Syd Worgan =

Personal information
- Nationality: (United Kingdom) British
- Born: 1917 Llanharan, Wales
- Died: 9 July 1996 (aged 78–79)
- Weight: featherweight

Boxing career

Boxing record
- Total fights: 51
- Wins: 20
- Win by KO: 2
- Losses: 21
- Draws: 10
- No contests: 0

Syd Worgan (1917 – 9 July 1996) was a professional boxer from Wales. Born in Llanharan Worgan was notable for becoming the Welsh featherweight champion in 1944.

== Personal history ==
Worgan was born in Llanharan in 1917 and was one of six brothers. A coal miner by occupation, he worked at the local pit, Llanharan Colliery. In 1959 he and his wife Dilys became owners of the Bear Inn in Llantrisant and kept the establishment until his retirement in 1985.

== Boxing career ==
Although Worgan had no history of boxing in his family, he became interested in the sport when he was given a pair of boxing gloves by his only sister, Elizabeth. He turned professional at the age of 18 and in his career is reported to have fought in approximately 150 bouts, though as of 2010, BoxRec has only 51 recorded contests. He began training in the small Turberville room on Chapel Road just off Llanharan Square, before moving to the High Corner yard. His trainers at this time were Billy Watkins and Bert Harris.

On his way to his 1944 challenge for the Welsh featherweight title, Worgan met several of Britain's best fighters. He lost to two lightweight ex-champions, Len Beynon in 1939 and Cuthbert Taylor in 1940, but he also took wins over George Pook, a future South-West featherweight champion and Warren Kendall who would become Welsh lightweight champion in 1948. Worgan made headlines in 1941 when he faced the World number two Ritchie "Kid" Tanner of British Guyana, beating him on points. In 1942 Worgan, now under the management of ex-fighter Billy "Kid" Hughes, faced his most notable adversary Nel Tarleton. Tarleton was the Commonwealth champion who in 1934 lost on points to Freddie Miller for the NBA title in 1934. The match was held at the Royal Albert Hall on 30 March and was scheduled for eight rounds. The match went the distance with Worgan losing on a points decision. Despite being beaten Worgan later commented that 'Nel was one of the greatest in the game.' Worgan faced Tarleton on another two occasions, losing both on points decisions, in Liverpool in 1942 and Nottingham in 1943.

On 11 November 1944, Worgan fought Tommy Davies from Nantyglo for the vacant Welsh featherweight title. The fifteen-round match was contested in Newport, south Wales with Worgan taking the bout on points. Worgan continued fighting until 1949 with irregular results. Boxing News wrote of him, "Worgan is worth while watching; he has the uncanny sense of timing. His punches and all his movements are harmonious without being theatrical".

== Bibliography ==
- Lee, Tony (2009). All in My Corner: A tribute to some forgotten Welsh boxing heroes. Ammanford: TL Associates. ISBN 978-0-9564456-0-5.
- Witts, T.J. (1988). The Forgotten Years, volume 2: a history of Llanharan & district. Llanharan: Diary Publishing. ISBN 1-871691-00-1.
