= Henry Hall (British boxer) =

British boxer

Personal information
- Nationality: British
- Born: 6 September 1922
- Died: 26 April 1979 (aged 56) Sheffield, England
- Height: 5 ft 8.5 in (1.740 m)
- Weight: Welterweight, middleweight

Boxing career

Boxing record
- Total fights: 65
- Wins: 42
- Win by KO: 16
- Losses: 20
- Draws: 3

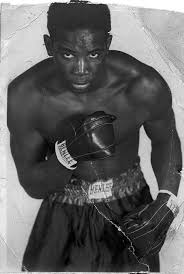
Henry Hall, photo undated

Henry Hall (6 September 1922 – 26 April 1979) was a British boxer who was a British welterweight champion between 1948 and 1949.

== Career ==
From Sheffield, Hall had success as an amateur, winning the 1944 Amateur Boxing Association British welterweight title, when boxing out of the Hillsborough ABC, before making his professional début in February 1945 with a win over Bob Moorcroft. Initially a welterweight, he won his first 15 fights before losing in April 1946 to Scottish Area champion Ginger Stewart. In September 1946 he met Stewart again in an eliminator for the British title, again losing. Over the next 18 months he won nine fights but lost to Harry Lazar, Eddie Thomas, and Tommy Armour.

He had a second title eliminator in March 1948, this time against Willie Whyte, winning via a 10th round knockout. He beat Swiss Champion Rock Gianola in May, and beat Armour in a final eliminator in August to set up a title fight against Ernie Roderick in November, which had initially been delayed due to Roderick suffering an arm injury. Hall won a controversial 15 round points decision to take the title and end Roderick's ten-year reign as champion. Roderick's manager Nel Tarleton officially protested the result, but it was upheld by the BBBofC.

Hall won his next two fights, against Belgian champion Willy Wimms and the highly regarded American Tony Janiro, and he was considered a world title contender, but he then suffered defeats to French Champion Emmanuel Clavel, Canadian Frankie Cordino, and Ric Sanders. In November 1949, he faced Thomas in his first British title defence; Thomas won on points to take the title.

As a local celebrity, Hall was called on to start a walking race in his home town in April 1950, and in the same month was a judge in a regional round of the 'Britain's Perfect Man' contest organized by Mecca Dancing.

Hall won his next two fights before moving up to middleweight in June 1950 under a new manager Nat Seller. He won his first three fights at the weight but couldn't repeat the success he had as a welterweight, and after a mixed record between 1950 and 1951, failed to win any of his last ten fights, before retiring in 1952.
