= Jackie Brown (English boxer) =

British boxer (1909–1971)

Personal information
- Nationality: British
- Born: John Brown; 29 November 1909 Collyhurst, England
- Died: 15 March 1971 (aged 61)
- Weight: Flyweight

Boxing career
- Stance: Orthodox

Boxing record
- Total fights: 140
- Wins: 107
- Win by KO: 40
- Losses: 24
- Draws: 9

John Brown (29 November 1909 – 15 March 1971), better known as Jackie Brown, was a flyweight boxing world champion. He held the NBA, IBU and British flyweight titles. He would be stripped of both his NBA and IBU titles while still having not been beaten at flyweight since the beginning of his reigns. The NBA stripped him on July 6, 1934 when he was arrested and sentenced to four months in prison for assault. while he was stripped of his IBU title for not giving Valentin Angelmann another chance after a draw in a title bout against him. His British flyweight title would be the only title he lost in the ring when he was defeated on September 9, 1935 to Benny Lynch thus taking all claims he laid to being a flyweight champion.

== Professional career ==
Born John Brown in Collyhurst, England, he had his first professional fight on 18 May 1925, at the age of sixteen, defeating Harry Gainey on points over six rounds.

In October 1929, he won the vacant British flyweight title, knocking out Bert Kirby in three rounds. The BBBofC subsequently recognised Brown as the World Champion, succeeding the later Johnny Hill, and received confirmation from the New York State Athletic Commission that they were willing to allow him to defend the title in the US. In March 1930, he defended the British title against Kirby, and was knocked out in the third round. In February 1931, he met Kirby for the third time, winning back the title with fifteen-round points decision.

In May 1931, he won the European flyweight title, beating Lucian Popescu, of Romania on points. In the next two months he defended this title twice, winning on points against Emile Degand, of Belgium and Vincenzo Savo, of Italy.

In October 1931, Brown married Mary Chapman.

In September 1932, he defended both his titles against Jim Maharg, winning on a disqualification in the eighth, for a low blow.

== Legal issues ==
In October 1933, Jackie Brown ran over and killed Margaret Thornley with his car. He did not receive any punishment whatsoever for taking her life. The very next year, Brown actually found himself in trouble with the law when he was convicted of assault by occasioning bodily harm for biting a piece out of the ear of Louis Tarchman in a Manchester street after Tarchman had called him a "cheese champion". Brown served four months of imprisonment with hard labour in August 1934.

In September 1935, he was fined £10 and had his driving licence endorsed after being caught speeding; At the trial it emerged that he had over 20 previous convictions for driving offences, some of them serious.

== World titles ==
In October 1932, he fought Victor 'Young' Perez, of Tunisia for the World flyweight championship, beating him in thirteen rounds when Perez' corner threw in the towel. Brown was recognized as world flyweight champion by the National Boxing Association of America.

In June and September 1933, he defended his World and European titles against Valentin Angelmann, of France, winning both defences on points.

In December 1933, he defended his British, European and World titles against Chris ‘Ginger’ Foran of Liverpool, winning on points.

In June 1934, he defended his World and European titles against Angelmann, for the third time, this time, after his previous two wins drawing on points.

In 1935, Brown was stripped of his European title for not giving Angelmann a return bout.

On 29 July 1935, Brown won two fights on the same night, stopping Jackie Quinn in the second round of twelve, and Sid Rose in the third of six.

In September 1935, he defended his British and World flyweight titles against the talented Scottish fighter, Benny Lynch. He lost his titles when the referee stopped the contest in the second round.

== Later career at Bantamweight ==
Following the loss of his titles, Brown continued fighting as a bantamweight. Having won the Northern Area title in October 1936, in May 1937 he fought holder Johnny King for the British bantamweight title, losing by a knockout in the thirteenth round. This was his last challenge for a national or international title, but he continued fighting until July 1939. He then retired, but made a one-fight comeback in February 1948, when he scored a points victory over Billy Stevens over eight rounds.

== Professional boxing record ==
140 fights	107 wins	24 losses
By knockout	40	5
By decision	64	15
By disqualification	3	4
Draws	9	

No.	Result	Record	Opponent	Type	Round	Date	Location	Notes
140	Win	107–24–9	Benny Jones	PTS	10	Jul 24, 1939	King's Hall, Belle Vue, Manchester, Lancashire, England	
139	Loss	106–24–9	Richie 'Kid' Tanner	PTS	10	Jul 20, 1939	The Stadium, Liverpool, Merseyside, England	
138	Win	106–23–9	Teddy O'Neill	PTS	10	May 8, 1939	Tucker Smith, England	
137	Loss	105–23–9	Tucker Smith	PTS	10	Apr 24, 1939	Tucker Smith, England	
136	Win	105–22–9	Battling Jim Hayes	PTS	15	Mar 20, 1939	King's Hall, Belle Vue, Manchester, Lancashire, England	Won BBBofC Northern bantamweight title
135	Win	104–22–9	Syd Parker	PTS	10	Feb 6, 1939	Victoria Baths, Nottingham, Nottinghamshire, England	
134	Draw	103–22–9	Benny Jones	PTS	10	Dec 6, 1938	Villa Marina Ballroom, Douglas, Isle of Man	
133	Win	103–22–8	Ginger Murphy	TKO	4 (10)	Nov 28, 1938	King's Hall, Belle Vue, Manchester, Lancashire, England	
132	Win	102–22–8	Pierce Ellis	PTS	10	Oct 31, 1938	King's Hall, Belle Vue, Manchester, Lancashire, England	
131	Win	101–22–8	Dave Kellar	TKO	3 (10)	Oct 5, 1938	Devonshire Club, Hackney, London, England	
130	Win	100–22–8	Battling Jim Hayes	PTS	10	Jul 25, 1938	King's Hall, Belle Vue, Manchester, Lancashire, England	
129	Loss	99–22–8	Joe Connolly	PTS	8	Jun 29, 1938	St Mirren Football Ground, Paisley, Scotland	
128	Win	99–21–8	Joe Skelly	TKO	10 (10)	Apr 17, 1938	Dillington Park Grounds, Barnsley, Yorkshire, England	
127	Loss	98–21–8	Jim Brady	PTS	8	Apr 7, 1938	Hippodrome, Darlington, County Durham, England	
126	Win	98–20–8	Freddie Tennant	PTS	10	Mar 14, 1938	Hippodrome, Darlington, County Durham, England	
125	Win	97–20–8	Pat Palmer	PTS	8	Mar 3, 1938	Earls Court Empress Hall, Kensington, London, England	
124	Win	96–20–8	Joe Skelly	PTS	10	Feb 15, 1938	Villa Marina Ballroom, Douglas, Isle of Man	
123	Loss	95–20–8	Battling Jim Hayes	PTS	12	Jan 10, 1938	Town Hall, Leeds, Yorkshire, England	
122	Loss	95–19–8	Len Hampston	DQ	13 (15)	Nov 24, 1937	Olympia, Bradford, Yorkshire, England	For BBBofC Northern Area bantamweight title
121	Win	95–18–8	Pat Palmer	RTD	6 (10)	Oct 11, 1937	Earls Court Empress Hall, Kensington, London, England	
120	Win	94–18–8	Benny Jones	PTS	10	Sep 7, 1937	Victoria Hall, Hanley, Staffordshire, England	
119	Loss	93–18–8	Johnny King	KO	13 (15)	May 31, 1937	King's Hall, Belle Vue, Manchester, Lancashire, England	For BBBofC British bantamweight title
118	Win	93–17–8	Juan Hernandez	TKO	8 (12)	Mar 21, 1937	Junction Stadium, Miles Platting, Lancashire, England	
117	Win	92–17–8	Van Meensal	KO	10 (12)	Mar 15, 1937	Baths Hall, Rotherham, Yorkshire, England	
116	Win	91–17–8	Bobby Hinds	PTS	12	Mar 8, 1937	Drill Hall, Falmouth, Cornwall, England	
115	Win	90–17–8	Len Beynon	PTS	15	Nov 30, 1936	King's Hall, Belle Vue, Manchester, Lancashire, England	
114	Win	89–17–8	Rafael Valdez	PTS	10	Nov 16, 1936	Kings Theatre, Cardiff, Wales	
113	Win	88–17–8	Jim McInally	KO	15 (15)	Nov 2, 1936	King's Hall, Belle Vue, Manchester, Lancashire, England	
112	Win	87–17–8	Len Hampston	PTS	15	Oct 5, 1936	Junction Stadium, Manchester, Lancashire, England	Won vacant BBBofC Northern Area bantamweight title
111	Win	86–17–8	Johnny Cusick	PTS	15	Jul 13, 1936	Junction Stadium, Manchester, Lancashire, England	
110	Loss	85–17–8	Johnny Cusick	PTS	15	May 18, 1936	King's Hall, Belle Vue, Manchester, Lancashire, England	
109	Win	85–16–8	Ted Green	KO	1 (12)	Apr 23, 1936	Earls Court Empress Hall, Kensington, London, England	
108	Win	84–16–8	Tucker Winch	KO	8 (12)	Mar 27, 1936	Tower Circus, Blackpool, Lancashire, England	
107	Win	83–16–8	Fred Nipper Morris	KO	8 (12)	Mar 6, 1936	King's Hall, Belle Vue, Manchester, Lancashire, England	
106	Win	82–16–8	Jacky Ryan	KO	4 (12)	Feb 28, 1936	Tower Circus, Blackpool, Lancashire, England	
105	Win	81–16–8	Nicolas Petit-Biquet	KO	6 (12)	Feb 7, 1936	King's Hall, Belle Vue, Manchester, Lancashire, England	
104	Win	80–16–8	Ellis Ashurst	KO	2 (12)	Dec 22, 1935	Brunswick Stadium, Leeds, Yorkshire, England	
103	Loss	79–16–8	Johnny King	RTD	6 (12)	Nov 22, 1935	King's Hall, Belle Vue, Manchester, Lancashire, England	
102	Win	79–15–8	Tommy Pardoe	KO	4 (12)	Nov 4, 1935	Embassy Rink, Sparbrook, West Midlands, England	
101	Win	78–15–8	Bert Kirby	TKO	12 (12)	Oct 14, 1935	Embassy Rink, Sparbrook, West Midlands, England	
100	Loss	77–15–8	Benny Lynch	TKO	2 (15)	Sep 9, 1935	King's Hall, Belle Vue, Manchester, Lancashire, England	Lost BBBofC British and world flyweight titles; For vacant NBA flyweight title
99	Win	77–14–8	Eric Jones	KO	3 (12)	Aug 15, 1935	Darnall Greyhound Track, Sheffield, Yorkshire, England	
98	Win	76–14–8	Jackie Quinn	TKO	2 (10)	Jul 29, 1935	King's Hall, Belle Vue, Manchester, Lancashire, England	
97	Win	75–14–8	Syd Rose	TKO	3 (10)	Jul 29, 1935	King's Hall, Belle Vue, Manchester, Lancashire, England	
96	Win	74–14–8	Ernst Weiss	PTS	10	Jun 24, 1935	King's Hall, Belle Vue, Manchester, Lancashire, England	
95	Win	73–14–8	George Marsden	KO	6 (12)	May 30, 1935	The Stadium, Liverpool, Merseyside, England	
94	Win	72–14–8	Maurice Filhol	PTS	12	Mar 25, 1935	Embassy Rink, Birmingham, West Midlands, England	
93	Draw	71–14–8	Kid Francis	PTS	12	Mar 11, 1935	King's Hall, Belle Vue, Manchester, Lancashire, England	
92	Draw	71–14–7	Benny Lynch	PTS	12	Mar 4, 1935	Kelvin Hall, Glasgow, Scotland	
91	Win	71–14–6	Henri Barras	PTS	12	Feb 22, 1935	Tower Circus, Blackpool, Lancashire, England	
90	Win	70–14–6	Orlando Magliozzi	KO	4 (12)	Feb 11, 1935	King's Hall, Belle Vue, Manchester, Lancashire, England	
89	Draw	69–14–6	Valentin Angelmann	PTS	15	Jun 18, 1934	Belle Vue Speedway Stadium, Manchester, Lancashire, England	Retained NBA and IBU flyweight titles
88	Win	69–14–5	Aurel Toma	PTS	12	Apr 16, 1934	King's Hall, Belle Vue, Manchester, Lancashire, England	
87	Win	68–14–5	Ginger Foran	PTS	15	Dec 11, 1933	King's Hall, Belle Vue, Manchester, Lancashire, England	Retained NBA, IBU, and BBBofC British flyweight titles
86	Loss	67–14–5	Midget Wolgast	PTS	12	Oct 30, 1933	Royal Albert Hall, Kensington, London, England	
85	Win	67–13–5	Jimmy Young Knowles	PTS	12	Sep 26, 1933	Music Hall, Edinburgh, Scotland	
84	Win	66–13–5	Valentin Angelmann	PTS	15	Sep 11, 1933	King's Hall, Belle Vue, Manchester, Lancashire, England	
83	Loss	65–13–5	Mickey McGuire	DQ	7 (12)	Jul 24, 1933	King's Hall, Belle Vue, Manchester, Lancashire, England	
82	Win	65–12–5	Young Perez	PTS	12	Jul 3, 1933	King's Hall, Belle Vue, Manchester, Lancashire, England	
81	Win	64–12–5	Valentin Angelmann	PTS	15	Jun 12, 1933	Olympia, Kensington, London, England	Retained NBA and IBU flyweight titles
80	Win	63–12–5	Billy Bryon	TKO	14 (15)	May 7, 1933	The Ring, Blackfriars Road, Southwark, London, England	
79	Loss	62–12–5	Dave Crowley	DQ	10 (15)	May 1, 1933	King's Hall, Belle Vue, Manchester, Lancashire, England	
78	Loss	62–11–5	Etienne Mura	PTS	10	Feb 15, 1933	Palais de la Mutualité, Paris, France	
77	Win	62–10–5	Emile Degand	SD	10	Dec 2, 1932	Théâtre des Variétés, Charleroi, Hainaut, Belgium	
76	Win	61–10–5	Young Perez	RTD	13 (15)	Oct 31, 1932	King's Hall, Belle Vue, Manchester, Lancashire, England	Won NBA and IBU flyweight titles
75	Win	60–10–5	Jim Maharg	DQ	8 (15)	Sep 19, 1932	King's Hall, Belle Vue, Manchester, Lancashire, England	Retained EBU and BBBofC British flyweight titles
74	Loss	59–10–5	Tucker Winch	DQ	8 (12)	Aug 13, 1932	Hyde Park, Sheffield, Yorkshire, England	
73	Win	59–9–5	Bob Fielding	RTD	6 (15)	Aug 1, 1932	Blackpool Football Ground, Blackpool, Lancashire, England	
72	Win	58–9–5	Johnny Regan	TKO	9 (12)	Jul 6, 1932	Winter Gardens, Morecambe, Lancashire, England	
71	Win	57–9–5	George Marsden	TKO	6 (15)	Jun 9, 1932	Palace Coliseum, Douglas, Isle of Man	
70	Win	56–9–5	Len Beynon	PTS	15	Apr 18, 1932	King's Hall, Belle Vue, Manchester, Lancashire, England	
69	Win	55–9–5	Emile Degand	PTS	15	Mar 7, 1932	King's Hall, Belle Vue, Manchester, Lancashire, England	
68	Loss	54–9–5	Mickey McGuire	PTS	15	Feb 22, 1932	New St James Hall, Newcastle, Tyne and Wear, England	
67	Win	54–8–5	Benny Thackray	PTS	15	Feb 1, 1932	Town Hall, Leeds, Yorkshire, England	
66	Win	53–8–5	Jean Cuart	TKO	11 (15)	Feb 1, 1932	King's Hall, Belle Vue, Manchester, Lancashire, England	
65	Win	52–8–5	Percy (Young) Dexter	TKO	9 (12)	Dec 2, 1931	Winter Gardens, Morecambe, Lancashire, England	
64	Win	51–8–5	George Aziz	PTS	12	Nov 13, 1931	Tower Circus, Blackpool, Lancashire, England	
63	Win	50–8–5	Benny Thackray	PTS	15	Nov 8, 1931	Royton NSB, Royton, Lancashire, England	
62	Win	49–8–5	Ottavio Gori	RTD	8 (15)	Oct 12, 1931	King's Hall, Belle Vue, Manchester, Lancashire, England	
61	Win	48–8–5	Jim Maharg	DQ	8 (15)	Aug 24, 1931	King's Hall, Belle Vue, Manchester, Lancashire, England	
60	Win	47–8–5	Desire Collignon	PTS	15	Jul 20, 1931	Sportman's Group Gardens, Sheffield, Yorkshire, England	
59	Win	46–8–5	Vincenzo Savo	PTS	15	Jul 6, 1931	King's Hall, Belle Vue, Manchester, Lancashire, England	Retained EBU flyweight title
58	Win	45–8–5	Emile Degand	PTS	15	Jun 15, 1931	Olympia, Kensington, London, England	Retained EBU flyweight title
57	Win	44–8–5	Lucian Popescu	PTS	15	May 4, 1931	King's Hall, Belle Vue, Manchester, Lancashire, England	Won EBU flyweight title
56	Win	43–8–5	Bert Kirby	PTS	15	Feb 2, 1931	King's Hall, Belle Vue, Manchester, Lancashire, England	Won BBBofC British flyweight title
55	Win	42–8–5	Billy Kid Hughes	TKO	11 (15)	Sep 22, 1930	King's Hall, Belle Vue, Manchester, Lancashire, England	
54	Loss	41–8–5	Billy James	PTS	15	Jul 20, 1930	Palais de Danse, West Bromwich, West Midlands, England	
53	Win	41–7–5	Rene Chalange	PTS	15	Jun 23, 1930	King's Hall, Belle Vue, Manchester, Lancashire, England	
52	Win	40–7–5	Percy (Young) Dexter	KO	9 (15)	May 18, 1930	Ice Rink, West Bromwich, West Midlands, England	
51	Win	39–7–5	Emile Degand	PTS	15	Apr 21, 1930	King's Hall, Belle Vue, Manchester, Lancashire, England	
50	Loss	38–7–5	Bert Kirby	KO	3 (15)	Mar 3, 1930	National Sporting Club (Holborn Stadium), Holborn, London, England	Lost BBBofC British flyweight title
49	Win	38–6–5	Harry Hill	TKO	11 (15)	Dec 22, 1929	Palais de Danse, West Bromwich, West Midlands, England	
48	Win	37–6–5	Phineas John	PTS	15	Nov 13, 1929	Holborn Stadium Club, Holborn, London, England	
47	Win	36–6–5	Bert Kirby	KO	3 (15)	Oct 13, 1929	Palais de Danse, West Bromwich, West Midlands, England	Won vacant BBBofC British flyweight title
46	Win	35–6–5	Jim Campbell	TKO	9 (12)	Jun 18, 1929	King's Hall, Belle Vue, Manchester, Lancashire, England	
45	Win	34–6–5	Phineas John	PTS	12	Apr 22, 1929	National Sporting Club, Covent Garden, London, England	
44	Win	33–6–5	Tony Roberti	RTD	4 (15)	Mar 19, 1929	Free Trade Hall, Manchester, Lancashire, England	
43	Win	32–6–5	Walter Lemmon	RTD	13 (15)	Mar 5, 1929	Free Trade Hall, Manchester, Lancashire, England	
42	Win	31–6–5	George Greaves	PTS	15	Feb 12, 1929	Free Trade Hall, Manchester, Lancashire, England	Won vacant BBBofC Northern Area flyweight title
41	Win	30–6–5	Arthur Boy Edge	KO	3 (12)	Jan 6, 1929	National Sporting Club, Leeds, Yorkshire, England	
40	Draw	29–6–5	Cuthbert Taylor	PTS	15	Dec 26, 1928	Snow's Pavilion, Merthyr, Wales	
39	Win	29–6–4	Billy Kid Hughes	PTS	15	Dec 15, 1928	Pavilion, Bridgend, Wales	
38	Win	28–6–4	Dickie Inkles	PTS	15	Dec 9, 1928	National Sporting Club, Leeds, Yorkshire, England	
37	Win	27–6–4	Tommy Brown	PTS	15	Dec 4, 1928	Free Trade Hall, Manchester, Lancashire, England	
36	Loss	26–6–4	Phineas John	PTS	15	Nov 24, 1928	Gess Pavillon, Pontypridd, Wales	
35	Win	26–5–4	Jerry O'Neil	PTS	15	Nov 3, 1928	Gess Pavillon, Pontypridd, Wales	
34	Loss	25–5–4	Dickie Inkles	PTS	15	Oct 20, 1928	Palais de Danse, Ashton under Lyne, Lancashire, England	
33	Draw	25–4–4	Freddy Morgan	PTS	15	Oct 13, 1928	Baths, Ogmore Vale, Wales	
32	Win	25–4–3	Harry Yates	PTS	10	Sep 21, 1928	Palais de Danse, Ashton under Lyne, Lancashire, England	
31	Loss	24–4–3	Dickie Inkles	PTS	10	Aug 11, 1928	Hyde Park, Sheffield, Yorkshire, England	
30	Win	24–3–3	Jim Crawford	PTS	10	Aug 2, 1928	Liverpool Stadium, Pudsey Street, Liverpool, Merseyside, England	
29	Win	23–3–3	Jean Locatelli	PTS	10	Jul 9, 1928	Winter Gardens, Morecambe, Lancashire, England	
28	Win	22–3–3	Ernie Barker	PTS	6	Jul 5, 1928	Palais de Danse, Ashton under Lyne, Lancashire, England	
27	Win	21–3–3	Siki Coulton	RTD	3 (10)	Jul 3, 1928	Palais de Danse, Ashton under Lyne, Lancashire, England	
26	Win	20–3–3	Arthur Young Evitt	PTS	10	Jun 27, 1928	Winter Gardens, Morecambe, Lancashire, England	
25	Draw	19–3–3	Jack Glover	PTS	10	Jun 14, 1928	Liverpool Stadium, Pudsey Street, Liverpool, Merseyside, England	
24	Win	19–3–2	Joe Fleming	PTS	10	May 26, 1928	Palais de Danse, Ashton under Lyne, Lancashire, England	
23	Win	18–3–2	Freddy Webb	PTS	6	May 23, 1928	Winter Gardens, Morecambe, Lancashire, England	
22	Win	17–3–2	Freddy Webb	PTS	10	May 20, 1928	Adelphi Club, Salford, Lancashire, England	
21	Win	16–3–2	Martin Gallagher	PTS	12	Apr 30, 1928	Co-op Hall, Leigh, Lancashire, England	
20	Win	15–3–2	Freddy Morgan	PTS	15	Apr 21, 1928	Gess Pavillon, Pontypridd, Wales	
19	Win	14–3–2	Jim Crawford	PTS	10	Apr 2, 1928	Adelphi Club, Salford, Lancashire, England	
18	Win	13–3–2	Ernie Barker	PTS	10	Mar 16, 1928	Royal Pavilion, Blackpool, Lancashire, England	
17	Win	12–3–2	Young Fitz	PTS	6	Feb 14, 1928	Free Trade Hall, Manchester, Lancashire, England	
16	Draw	11–3–2	Jack Glover	PTS	10	Jan 13, 1928	Tower Circus, Blackpool, Lancashire, England	
15	Win	11–3–1	Jim Crawford	TKO	5 (10)	Dec 29, 1927	Osborne Theatre, Manchester, Lancashire, England	
14	Loss	10–3–1	Jack Glover	PTS	15	Dec 11, 1927	Adelphi Club, Salford, Lancashire, England	
13	Win	10–2–1	Young Siki	PTS	10	Nov 24, 1927	Liverpool Stadium, Pudsey Street, Liverpool, Merseyside, England	
12	Win	9–2–1	Jack Cantwell	PTS	10	Nov 18, 1927	Drill Hall, Mountain Ash, Wales	
11	Win	8–2–1	Freddy Webb	PTS	10	Nov 4, 1927	Ashbury Hall, Openshaw, Lancashire, England	
10	Win	7–2–1	Harry Yates	PTS	10	Oct 7, 1927	Ashbury Hall, Openshaw, Lancashire, England	
9	Win	6–2–1	Joe Fleming	PTS	6	Sep 27, 1927	Free Trade Hall, Manchester, Lancashire, England	
8	Win	5–2–1	Ben Doyle	TKO	4 (10)	Jul 26, 1927	Liverpool Stadium, Pudsey Street, Liverpool, Merseyside, England	
7	Win	4–2–1	Young Fargill	DQ	1 (6)	Jul 7, 1927	Liverpool Stadium, Pudsey Street, Liverpool, Merseyside,, England	
6	Draw	3–2–1	Ernie Hendricks	PTS	10	May 15, 1927	Adelphi Club, Salford, Lancashire, England	
5	Loss	3–2	Freddy Webb	TKO	3 (3)	Mar 15, 1927	Free Trade Hall, Manchester, Lancashire, England	
4	Win	3–1	Billy Cahill	KO	6 (10)	Mar 8, 1927	Free Trade Hall, Manchester, Lancashire, England	
3	Loss	2–1	Tommy Brown	PTS	10	Mar 6, 1927	Sussex Street Club, Salford, Lancashire, England	
2	Win	2–0	Dick Manning	PTS	6	Mar 23, 1926	Free Trade Hall, Manchester, England	
1	Win	1–0	Harry Gainey	PTS	6	May 18, 1925	Arena, Collyhurst, Lancashire, England	

== See also ==
- List of British flyweight boxing champions

== Sources ==
- Maurice Golesworthy, Encyclopaedia of Boxing (Eighth Edition) (1988), Robert Hale Limited, ISBN 0-7090-3323-0

Achievements
Vacant Title last held by Johnny Hill	British flyweight champion 13 October 1929 – 3 March 1930	Succeeded by Bert Kirby
Preceded by Bert Kirby	British flyweight champion 2 February 1931 – 9 September 1935	Succeeded by Benny Lynch
Preceded by Victor Perez	NBA flyweight champion 31 October 1932 - 6 June 1934; Stripped	Vacant Title next held by Small Montana
Preceded by Lucian Popescu	IBU flyweight champion 4 May 1931 - 6 June 1935; Stripped	Vacant Title next held by Valentin Angelmann
