= George Sutton (boxer) =

Welsh Boxer

Personal information
- Nationality: (United Kingdom) British
- Born: George Sutton, Sr. 15 September 1922 Cardiff, Wales
- Died: December 1995 (aged 73) Fairwater, Cardiff, Wales
- Weight: Flyweight

Boxing career

Boxing record
- Total fights: 20
- Wins: 3
- Win by KO: 0
- Losses: 15
- Draws: 2

George Sutton, Sr (15 September 1922 – December 1995) was a Welsh boxer who held the Welsh flyweight title on two occasions. His brother, Jackie Sutton, also held a Wales boxing belt and his son, George Jr, contested the British Bantamweight title.

== Boxing career ==
One of four boxing brothers, Sutton trained as an amateur at the Vale ABC. He turned professional in 1944 losing to Tommy Burney at The Stadium in Liverpool in his first professional bout. He failed to win in his next two fights, including a loss to Burmese fighter Al Hutt, when Sutton was knocked out by his opponent while he was hitching up his shorts.

On 14 June 1948 he was selected to fight Billy Davies, the holder of the Wales flyweight title, at Queen's Hall, Pontypridd. The fight went the full 15 rounds, with Sutton being given the title on points decision. Sutton fought at least three more times before his first defence of his new title, all fought in England and all ending in defeat. In March 1948, Sutton was called to defend his Wales title against the extremely experienced Norman Lewis. Lewis brought with him over a hundred fights and had once challenged for the British and Commonwealth belts at bantamweight. Sutton gave a good account, but was forced to retire in the final round of the twelve round contest; losing his championship title.

In July 1949 Sutton faced Glyn David, the first of four such meetings. Sutton lost on points, but then recorded a rare win, again over Billy Davies. In November 1949 Sutton again faced David, with an identical result, a points decision loss. His third fight to David was for the vacant Wales flyweight title, relinquished by Norman Lewis who had moved back to Bantamweight. The 12 round fight took place at Coney Beach Arena in Porthcawl in August 1950, and David made it a hat-trick of wins by beating Sutton on points.

Sutton began 1951 with a loss to George Edwards in Middlesbrough when he was disqualified in the fourth round. He followed this with another loss, this time to future Wales bantamweight champion Hughie Thomas at Maindy Stadium in Cardiff. Despite the poor run of form Sutton was allowed another challenge for the Wales lightweight title, still held by his rival Glyn David. The match was arranged for 4 October 1950 and was held at the Cardiff Arms Park in Cardiff. Sutton and David's 12 round fight were given top billing, with Tommy Farr challenging Robert Eugene on the undercard. Sutton showed he had learnt from his past encounters with David and this time was in complete control of the fight. Sutton gave an incredible display of hitting without being hit, scoring to the body and head while keeping out of David's range. The bout went the full distance and Sutton was given the decision, regaining the Welsh lightweight title.

Sutton fought a few more bouts after taking the title, but never defended it. He retired from competitive boxing in 1952, and spent some time in London as a sparring partner for the likes of South African fighter Jake Tuli. Although he spoke of going up in weight to challenge Welsh featherweight Dai Davies it never happened. He later revivied his old Vale club along with brother Jackie, and trained the next generation of fighters, including George Jr. He later moved to Fairwater area of Cardiff and died there in December 1995.
