= Lucian Popescu =

Romanian boxer

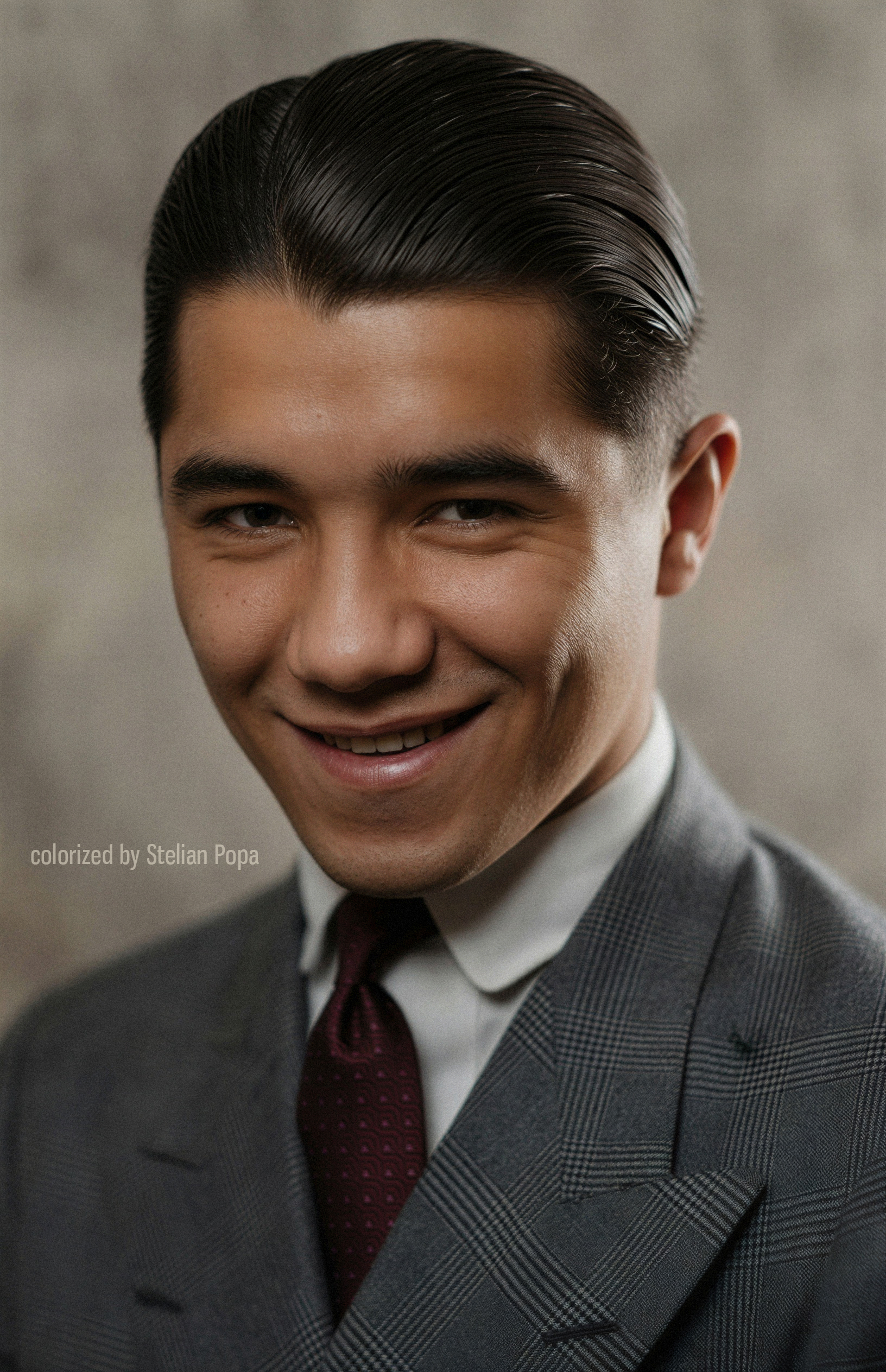

Personal information
- Nickname: The Chocolate Boy
- Nationality: (Romania) Romanian
- Born: January 12, 1912 Bucharest, Romania
- Died: December 9, 1982 (aged 70) Romania
- Weight: Featherweight

Boxing career

Boxing record
- Total fights: 76
- Wins: 49
- Win by KO: 13
- Losses: 13
- Draws: 13
- No contests: 1

Lucian Popescu (12 January 1912 in Bucharest – 9 December 1982) was a Romanian boxer who won European titles in three different classes.

Nicknamed Chocolate Boy ("băiatul de ciocolată"), he is considered to be the best Romanian boxer between the two world wars.

Making his amateur debut on 23 December 1927, he became national champion in the flyweight class in 1928. When he was 17, he decided to turn pro and won his first match against a German boxer.

On 7 June 1930, in Bucharest, he challenged flyweight European title holder Kid Oliva, a Frenchman. Having Umberto Lancia as his cornerman, Popescu won his first European belt. Later, he would win two more European belts in 1931 in the bantamweight class (cornermen Constantin Nour and Marcu Spankow), and in 1939 in the featherweight class.

After he retired as a boxer he became a trainer at the "Progresul" boxing club in Bucharest, where he had among his disciples European amateur champions Gheorghe Negrea and Aurel Dumitrescu.

He died on 9 December 1982.

== Professional boxing record ==
49 Wins (13 knockouts, 36 decisions), 13 Losses (4 knockouts, 9 decisions), 13 Draws, 1 No contest
Result	Record	Opponent	Type	Round	Date	Location	Notes
Loss	1-0-1	(Romania) Petre Brătescu	RTD		1945-07-15	Romania	
Draw	1-0	(Romania) Petre Brătescu	PTS		1945-04-28	Romania	
Win	6-4-4	(Romania) Gheorghe Popescu	PTS		1945-04-15	Romania	
Win	24-14-6	(Romania) Ion Sandu	PTS	12 (12)	1943-08-09	Bucharest, Romania	Won Romanian lightweight title.
Loss	60-3-4	(Italy) Gino Bondavalli	PTS	15 (15)	1942-05-31	Reggio Emilia, Italy	For EBU (European) featherweight title.
Draw	0-1	(Romania) Constantin David	PTS	12 (12)	1942-04-26	Romania	
Loss	0-0	(Romania) Constantin David	PTS	10 (10)	1942-03-08	Romania	
Loss	49-18-8	(Austria) Ernst Weiss	PTS	15 (15)	1941-05-30	Engelmann Arena, Vienna, Austria	For EBU (European) featherweight title.
Win	24-13-6	(Romania) Ion Sandu	PTS	10 (10)	1941-05-24	Bucharest, Romania	
Win	9-6-4	(Serbia) Stefan Eisenreich	PTS	10 (10)	1940-10-05	Belgrade, Serbia	
Win	55-21-10	(Italy) Gino Cattaneo	PTS	10 (10)	1939-07-01	Bucharest, Romania	
Win	32-12-6	(Belgium) Phil Dolhem	PTS	15 (15)	1939-06-03	Arenel Romane, Bucharest, Romania	Won EBU (European) featherweight title.
Win	0-0	(United Kingdom) Tommy Carr	PTS	8 (8)	1938-01-27	Eldorado Stadium, Edinburgh-Leith, United Kingdom	
Loss	32-5	(Tunisia) Housine Caid	PTS	10 (10)	1938-12-08	Salle Wagram, Paris, France	
Draw	2-3-2	(Romania) Gheorghe Popescu	PTS	10 (10)	1938-07-16	Bucharest, Romania	
Draw	16-4-3	(France) Rene Taysse	PTS	10 (10)	1938-01-07	Élysée Montmartre, Paris, France	
Win	6-1-3	(Romania) Vasile Stoian	PTS		1938-01-01	Romania	
Draw	0-0	Pachi Martinez	PTS		1937-10-22		
Draw	1-2-0	(Romania) Gheorghe Popescu	PTS		1936-09-04	Romania	
NC	4-3-4	(Italy) Vince Dell'Orto	NC		1936-07-26	Bucharest, Romania	
Win	0-5-3	(Romania) Ion Mihail	KO	3 (10)	1936-06-06	Bucharest, Romania	Won Romanian featherweight title.
Loss	4-3-1	(Belgium) Achille Wimme	PTS	10 (10)	1935-05-25	Arenele Romane, Bucharest, Romania	
Loss	7-3-5	(Romania) Aurel Toma	PTS	10 (10)	1935-05-15	Arenele Romane, Bucharest, Romania	
Win	0-0	(Romania) Gheorghe Popescu	PTS	10 (10)	1934-08-23	Ploiești, Romania	Won Romanian featherweight title.
Win	1-6-3	(Romania) Mielu Marinescu	PTS	10 (10)	1934-07-21	Arenele Romane, Bucharest, Romania	
Win	0-1-1	(Romania) Traian Dumitrescu	PTS	10 (10)	1934-07-18	Stadion Dragoș Vodă, Bucharest, Romania	
Loss	89-6-2	(Spain) Jose Girones	KO	7 (15)	1933-11-22	Teatro Circo Olympia, Barcelona, Spain	For EBU (European) featherweight title.
Win	12-1-5	(Germany) Richard Stegemann	PTS	10 (10)	1933-09-01	Arenele Romane, Bucharest, Romania	
Win	4-5-4	(Romania) Gheorghe Stamate	PTS	10 (10)	1933-06-24	Arenele Romane, Bucharest, Romania	
Win	11-5-10	(Germany) Wilhelm Bartneck	PTS	10 (10)	1933-05-09	Arenele Romane, Bucharest, Romania	
Win	1-4	(Romania) Mihail Covaci	RTD	10 (10)	1933-03-31	Bucharest, Romania	
Loss	44-23-10	(Belgium) Nicolas Petit-Biquet	PTS	10 (10)	1933-02-25	Palais des Sports, Brussels, Belgium	
Loss	41-11-11	(France) Guy Bonaugure	PTS	10 (10)	1933-01-07	Paris-Ring, Paris, France	
Draw	12-3-6	(Germany) Hans Schiller	PTS	10 (10)	1932-11-18	Bucharest, Romania	
Draw	1-3-2	(Romania) Nelu Oprescu	PTS	10 (10)	1932-09-24	Arenele Romane, Bucharest, Romania	For Romanian featherweight title.
Win	9-7-7	(Austria) Josef Pospischil	KO	5 (10)	1932-07-30	Bucharest, Romania	
Win	4-4-4	(Romania) Gheorghe Stamate	RTD	7 (10)	1932-07-23	Arenele Romane, Bucharest, Romania	Won Romanian featherweight title.
Draw	21-12-6	(France) Johnny Alphonse Edwards	PTS	10 (10)	1932-06-19	Bucharest, Romania	
Win	0-2	(Romania) Marin Plaeșu	PTS	10 (10)	1932-06-04	Arenele Romane, Bucharest, Romania	
Win	15-6-6	(Germany) Georg Pfitzner	KO	2 (10)	1932-05-21	Arenele Romane, Bucharest, Romania	
Draw	9-7-1	(Romania) Mielu Doculescu	PTS	10 (10)	1932-05-11	Bucharest, Romania	
Win	9-6-1	(Romania) Mielu Doculescu	PTS	10 (10)	1932-04-24	Arenele Romane, Bucharest, Romania	
Loss	40-14-5	(Italy) Domenico Bernasconi	KO	5 (15)	1932-03-19	Milan, Italy	For EBU (European) bantamweight title.
Loss	42-15-4	(France) Eugène Huat	RTD	5 (10)	1932-02-08	Palais des Sports, Paris, France	
Win	4-3-2	(Romania) Gheorghe Stamate	PTS		1932-01-07	Romania	
Win	35-14-10	(France) Julien Pannecoucke	KO	4 (10)	1931-12-21	Palais des Sports, Paris, France	
Win	41-6-3	(Spain) Carlos Flix	PTS	15 (15)	1931-09-19	Arenele Romane, Bucharest, Romania	Won EBU (European) bantamweight title.
Win	4-2-2	(Romania) Gheorghe Stamate	PTS	10 (10)	1931-08-29	Arenele Romane, Bucharest, Romania	
Win	18-6-5	(Belgium) Emile Degand	PTS	10 (10)	1931-07-11	Arenele Romane, Bucharest, Romania	
Win	40-15-6	(Belgium) Nicolas Petit-Biquet	PTS	10 (10)	1931-06-06	Arenele Romane, Bucharest, Romania	
Win	12-2-4	(Germany) Georg Pfitzner	KO	2 (10)	1931-05-21	Bucharest, Romania	
Loss	43-8-5	(United Kingdom) Jackie Brown	PTS	15 (15)	1931-05-04	Kings Hall, Manchester, United Kingdom	For EBU (European) flyweight title.
Win	43-16-8	(France) Francois Biron	PTS	10 (10)	1931-04-13	Bucharest, Romania	
Win	4-1-2	(Romania) Gheorghe Stamate	RTD	1 (12)	1931-02-14	Sidoli Circus, Bucharest, Romania	
Win	9-1-1	(Italy) Carlo Cavagnoli	PTS	10 (10)	1930-11-15	Sidoli Circus, Bucharest, Romania	
Win	20-1-1	(France) Valentin Angelmann	PTS	10 (10)	1930-10-18	Sidoli Circus, Bucharest, Romania	
Win	33-18-11	(France) Rene Chalange	PTS	15 (15)	1930-08-16	Arenele Romane, Bucharest, Romania	Retained EBU (European) flyweight title.
Win	32-4-2	(France) Kid Oliva	RTD	10 (15)	1930-06-07	Ramcomit Hall, Bucharest, Romania	Won EBU (European) flyweight title.
Win	0-0	(Romania) Gheorghe Begheș	KO	2 (8)	1930-04-12	Sidoli Circus, Bucharest, Romania	
Draw	4-0-1	(Romania) Gheorghe Stamate	PTS	10 (10)	1930-02-22	Bucharest, Romania	
Loss	3-0-1	(Romania) Gheorghe Stamate	PTS	10 (10)	1929-12-14	Bucharest, Romania	For Romanian bantamweight title.
Win	15-37-7	(France) Rene Gabes	PTS		1929-11-17	Bucharest, Romania	
Win	30-13-10	(France) Rene Chalange	PTS	10 (10)	1929-09-29	Sidoli Circus, Bucharest, Romania	
Draw	15-33-6	(France) Rene Gabes	PTS	10 (10)	1929-08-10	Central Sporting Club, Paris, France	
Draw	1-0	(Romania) Gheorghe Stamate	PTS	10 (10)	1929-08	Bucharest, Romania	
Win	0-0-1	(Sweden) Werner Hermansson	PTS	6 (6)	1929-05-09	Bucharest, Romania	
Win	2-3	(Romania) Mielu Doculescu	PTS	3 (3)	1929-04-27	Bucharest, Romania	
Win	1-2	(Romania) Mielu Doculescu	PTS	3 (3)	1929-02-08	Bucharest, Romania	
Win	1-1	(Romania) Dumitru Ivan	PTS	3 (3)	1929-02-02	Bucharest, Romania	
Win	1-1	(Romania) Mielu Doculescu	PTS	3 (3)	1928-12-15	Bucharest, Romania	
Win	0-1	(Romania) Marin Plaeșu	PTS	3 (3)	1928-12-05	Romania	Won Romanian flyweight title.
Win	0-0	(Romania) Gheoghe Gabor	RTD	3 (6)	1928-11-14	Bucharest, Romania	
Win	0-1	(Romania) Nelu Oprescu	RTD	2 (6)	1928-05-09	Bucharest, Romania	
Win	0-0	(Romania) Ion Bondac	PTS	6 (6)	1928-02-02	Bucharest, Romania	
Win	0-1	(Romania) Dumitru Popa	KO	1 (6)	1928-01-13	Bucharest, Romania	
Win	0-0	(Romania) Nelu Oprescu	PTS	6 (6)	1927-12-23	Bucharest, Romania	

== Awards ==
- National Sport Award ("Premiul național al sporturilor")
- Honored Trainer ("Antrenor emerit")
