= Bert Kirby =

English boxer (1908-1975)

Personal information
- Nationality: (United Kingdom) British
- Born: 2 December 1908
- Died: 1975 (aged 66–67)
- Weight: Flyweight

Boxing career
- Stance: Orthodox

Boxing record
- Total fights: 202
- Wins: 122
- Win by KO: 40
- Losses: 62
- Draws: 17
- No contests: 0

Bert Kirby (2 December 1908 – 1975) was an English flyweight boxer, who became British flyweight champion in 1930.

== Career ==
Born in Birmingham, Kirby made his professional debut in March 1924 with a win over Billy Burns. Unbeaten in his first twelve fights, his first loss came in January 1927 at the hands of Dick Corbett. In a run of sixteen straight wins that followed in the first half of 1927, he beat Corbett three times.

In the late 1920s he moved to trainer Fred Dyer and boxed out of Dyer's gym in the Strand, London.

In March 1928 he won a British title eliminator against Minty Rose, but would have to wait 18 months before getting his title shot.

In October 1928 he lost a points decision to former European title challenger Nicolas Petit-Biquet at the Royal Albert Hall, also losing a rematch two months later. He suffered a further defeat at the hands of then 15-year old Nipper Pat Daly before the year was out.

In June 1929 he beat Harry Hill on points to take the Midlands flyweight title, and in August beat Billy James in a British title eliminator, which became a final eliminator with the death of British champion Johnny Hill, and in October 1929 he faced Jackie Brown for the vacant title. Brown knocked him out in the third round to take the title.

In March 1930, Kirby challenged again for the British title at the National Sporting Club, this time knocking Brown out in the third to become British flyweight champion. He had two further fights later the same month, a win over Young Siki, and a loss by knockout to Frenchman Rene Chalange.

In November 1930, Kirby was knocked down by a lorry after stopping his car on the way home from a fight in Coventry, suffering back and leg injuries, and causing several fights to be cancelled, including a defence of his British title against Brown. Kirby was stripped of his British title on 6 January 1931 by the British Boxing Board of Control after his licence expired, but had a chance to regain it the following month in his fight against Brown, which the board recognised as a contest for the vacant title; Kirby lost on points to Brown.

Kirby made a successful challenge for the Southern Area flyweight title in April 1933, beating Boy Edge on points, but lost it in March 1934 to Tommy Pardoe, who had also beaten him three months earlier in a non-title fight. His final fight was a win over Jamaican featherweight champion Young Chocolate in August 1938.

After retiring, Kirby claimed that he had turned down two world title fights during his career, due to the fights being 'fixed', with the boxers contracted for three fights, with an agreement that they each win one of the first two to build up interest and money for the third, which would be a straight fight.

== See also ==
- List of British flyweight boxing champions
