= Ken Rowlands =

Wales boxer

Personal information
- Nationality: (United Kingdom) British
- Born: Kenneth Moore Rowlands; 3 July 1927 Maerdy, Wales
- Died: 14 August 2011 (aged 84)
- Weight: Light heavyweight

Boxing career
- Stance: Orthodox

Boxing record
- Total fights: 68
- Wins: 40
- Win by KO: 18
- Losses: 23
- Draws: 5
- No contests: 0

Ken Rowlands (3 July 1927 – 14 August 2011) was a Welsh light heavyweight boxer. Born in Maerdy in the Rhondda Valley but fighting out of Luton in England, Rowland's professional career spanned from 1948 to 1958. He first won the Welsh light heavyweight title in 1953, but after losing the title, retook it again in 1955.
