= Lefty Satan Flynn =

Belizean boxer

Lefty 'Satan' Flynn

Personal information
- Nationality: (Belize) Belizean
- Born: 17 March 1917 British Honduras
- Weight: welterweight

Boxing career
- Stance: Southpaw

Boxing record
- Total fights: 114
- Wins: 79
- Win by KO: 36
- Losses: 27
- Draws: 7
- No contests: 0

Lefty 'Satan' Flynn (born 17 March 1917) born Selvin Campbell in British Honduras (present day Belize) was a professional boxer. Flynn also known as His Satanic Majesty fought out of Jamaica becoming Jamaican featherweight and later welterweight champion. After taking the Jamaican titles he moved to Britain in late 1936. Flynn was a successful opponent in British boxing circles and fought many of the up-and-coming fighters of his age. In 1954 he made an unsuccessful attempt at the British Honduras welterweight title in Belize City.

== Personal history ==
Flynn, born as Selvin Campbell in British Honduras, moved to Jamaica while still an adolescent. He went to school in Kingston, Jamaica, and travelled to Great Britain in 1936. With the outbreak of the Second World War he joined the Merchant Navy.

== Boxing career ==
Flynn's first recorded professional fight, weighing in as a flyweight, was as a nineteen-year-old facing similarly inexperienced fighters in Kingston, Jamaica. After a draw against Kid Walcott, He faced Kid Bailey three times, winning twice and drawing once. There is no official record of another professional encounter until four years later in 1931 when Flynn faced Young Harvey at the Ward Theatre in Jamaica. On 23 April 1932 he faced St Andrew Pup for the Jamaican Lightweight title, though there is no record of this being a vacant title and neither men being the holder. Flynn stopped Pup for the first time in his career, taking the championship crown. Flynn held the title until relinquishing the belt after rising to lightweight and challenging Kid Silver on 12 November 1932. Flynn failed in his challenge but continued to fight in Jamaica winning the majority of his contest. In early 1936, and now fighting at the next weight level of welterweight, Flynn fought Kid Silver again this time for the Jamaican Welterweight title. Silver was disqualified in the eighth giving Flynn his second Jamaican boxing title. Flynn fought a few more bouts in Jamaica, before travelling to Britain to continue his career.

His first British fight was against Joe Kerr, a future Scottish Lightweight champion, winning by technical knockout in the second round. He lost to Boyo Rees towards the end of 1936, but then beat Len 'Tiger' Smith in January 1937. In Britain Flynn was unable to challenge for any of the British belts, but was a popular attraction on boxing cards during his time in the country. He fought at The Stadium in Liverpool, Earls Court Arena and both the National Sporting Club and Kelvin Hall in London. Flynn beat several notable British boxers during his time in the UK, including British champion Ronnie James, EBU welterweight champion Ernie Roderick, Welsh middleweight champion Tommy Davies and Southern area title holder Arthur Danahar.

In 1946, Flynn left the United Kingdom and travelled back to the Caribbean. On 30 April 1946 he faced the Venezuelan welterweight champion, J.J. Fernandez at Port-of-Spain in Trinidad and Tobago. Flynn lost the match on points. Although no record of his interim fights is available, in 1954 Flynn re-appears on the boxing scene in a challenge for the British Honduras welterweight title against Rudolph Bent. Bent won the contest by points, and in a rematch two months later in November Bent beat Flynn again, this time by technical knockout.

== Bibliography ==
- Lee, Tony (2009). All in My Corner: A tribute to some forgotten Welsh boxing heroes. Ammanford: TL Associates. ISBN 978-0-9564456-0-5.
