= Ernie Roderick =

Personal information
- Nationality: British
- Born: 25 January 1914 Liverpool, England
- Died: 5 June 1986 (aged 72)
- Weight: Welterweight, middleweight

Boxing career

Boxing record
- Wins: 112
- Win by KO: 45
- Losses: 24
- Draws: 4

Ernie Roderick (25 January 1914 – 5 June 1986) was a British boxer who was British champion at both welterweight and middleweight, and European champion at welterweight and was a World title challenger losing on points against Henry Armstrong who BoxRec recognised as the second greatest pound for pound boxer of all time.

== Career ==
Born in Liverpool. Ernie Roderick took up boxing as a schoolboy and began his professional boxing career in 1931. Defeated only once in his first two years as a pro, Roderick travelled to Australia in 1933, where he drew with Bobby Blay and suffered defeats to Bobby Delaney and Young Pluto. Back in the UK, he lost seven fights in 1934, but he returned to form in 1935, winning seventeen and drawing one fight in an unbeaten run which included victories over Len "Tiger" Smith and Pat Butler. His run of form continued between 1936 and 1938, beating Jake Kilrain twice among many others.

In March 1939 he faced Kilrain for the British welterweight title, winning via a seventh-round knockout. He fought Henry Armstrong for the World welterweight title in May 1939, losing on points.

He defended the British title successfully in July 1940 against Norman Snow. In September 1940 Roderick joined the Royal Air Force. The following year beat Jack Kid Berg on points at the Royal Albert Hall. He made his second successful defence of his British title in September 1941 against Arthur Danahar.

In May 1945 he fought Vince Hawkins for the British middleweight title vacated by Jock McAvoy; Roderick won on points to hold two British titles simultaneously.

In June 1946 he fought Omar Kouidri for the vacant European welterweight title, winning on points over 15 rounds. He defended his British middleweight title in a rematch with Hawkins in October 1946, this time losing a points decision.

In February 1947 he lost his European title to Robert Villemain in Paris. He successfully defended his British welterweight title twice later that year, against Gwyn Williams and Eric Boon. He lost the title in November 1948 to Henry Hall on points, ending a nine-year reign as champion. Roderick formally protested the decision, but to no avail. He fought Eddie Thomas in September 1949 in a final eliminator to challenge for the title once again, but lost a points decision. He fought only once more, a defeat to Cliff Curvis in February 1950, before retiring from the sport.
