= Freddy Morgan =

Welsh Boxer

Personal information
- Nationality: (United Kingdom) British
- Born: 1908 Gilfach Goch
- Died: 1990 (aged 81–82)
- Weight: Flyweight

Boxing career

Boxing record
- Total fights: 38
- Wins: 12
- Win by KO: 1
- Losses: 16
- Draws: 10

Freddy Morgan (1908–1990) was a Welsh boxer who held the Welsh flyweight title in 1928.
