= Glen Moody =

Wales boxer

Personal information
- Nationality: Welsh
- Born: 1909 Pontypridd, Wales
- Died: 1989 (aged 79–80)
- Weight: Middleweight, Light heavyweight

Boxing career
- Stance: Orthodox

Boxing record
- Total fights: 71
- Wins: 29
- Win by KO: 4
- Losses: 37
- Draws: 5
- No contests: 2

Glen Forest Moody B.E.M. (1909–1989) was a Welsh middleweight and light heavyweight boxer. Moody came from a notable family of boxers, six of his brothers fought professionally, with the most successful being British and Empire middleweight boxing champion Frank Moody. Glen Moody was Wales middleweight champion, winning the title in 1930 and successfully defended it on four occasions. Moody later moved up to light Middleweight and won the Wales title at that weight too.

== Personal history ==
=== Boxing career ===
Moody was born in Pontypridd, Wales in 1909. Moody was one of seven boxing brothers, the most notable of whom were Frank and Jack. Moody started boxing at the age of 14, and his first recorded professional bout was at the age of 16 when he met Jack Morgan at the Pillgwenlly Labour Hall in Newport on 9 January 1928. The fight went the full ten rounds and the referee decided the match was a draw. Just a month later Moody was fighting in the National Sporting Club in London, a points decision win over Jack Butler from Chesterfield. By the end of the year he was travelling to Liverpool to fight at The Stadium.

In 1939 Moody was appearing as far as Scotland, and fought the Scottish Middleweight champion, Steve McCall in Edinburgh. Although he lost via technical knockout in the tenth to McCall, Moody was impressing enough in his home country to garner a shot at the Wales middleweight title. A challenge was arranged against the title holder, Jerry Daley, who had won the belt just three months prior. The two met at Judges Hall in Trealaw on 15 February 1930, for a 15-round contest. The bout went the distance, and the referee awarded Daley the decision.

Towards the end of 1930 Moody faced Gunnar Andersson, the Swedish Welterweight champion, in London. The points decision went to Moody, but when the two met for a rematch Gothenburg less than a month later, Moody lost in round seven. In March 1931 Moody was given a rematch for Daley's Welsh title. Again the fight went the full fifteen rounds, but this time, in front of his home crowd, Moody was awarded the decision and the Welsh Middleweight title.

He was the subject of This Is Your Life in March 1962 when he was surprised by Eamonn Andrews in the foyer of London's Café Royal.

=== Military career ===
With the outbreak of the Second World War, Moody enlisted in the Royal Engineers and was mobilised to France. After the Fall of France, Moody was one of the soldiers evacuated at Dunkirk. On 14 March 1941, while stationed at Clydebank in Scotland, Moody was involved in the rescue of a civilian in a recently bombed building for which he received the British Empire Medal. His BEM citation reads:

Sergeant Glen Moody, Corps of Royal Engineers. On the 14th March, 1941, Sergeant Moody and Corporal Brynat went to the rescue of a trapped man in debris of bombed property in Castle Street, Clydebank. The condition of the wreckage was extremely dangerous, and great care and skill had to be exercised throughout. After tunnelling for 4 1/2 hours, the man was extricated alive. Among the ten men engaged in this work, Sergeant Moody and Corporal Bryant performed very dangerous work, taking risks without regard to their own safety, and upheld the best traditions of the Corps.
