= Joe Johns (boxer) =

Wales boxer

Personal information
- Nationality: Welsh
- Born: Joe John; 18 September 1892 Merthyr Tydfil, Wales
- Died: 18 September 1927 (aged 35) Merthyr Tydfil, Wales
- Weight: lightweight

Boxing career

Boxing record
- Total fights: 32
- Wins: 23
- Win by KO: 3
- Losses: 7
- Draws: 1
- No contests: 1

Joe Johns born Joe John (18 September 1892 – 18 September 1927) was a professional boxer from Wales. Born in Merthyr Tydfil, John was notable for becoming the Welsh lightweight champion in 1915. He was successful at a domestic level, but his career was curtailed by ill-health.

== Boxing career ==
John's early professional career was based mainly in Wales. His early successes normally came through points decisions, his victories rarely ended by a knock-out. He won his first competition at the age of 15, weighing in at six stone. By the time he won his first recognised national fight, a disqualification win over Young Walters at Cardiff's Badminton Club, he weighed eight stone eight pounds. On the 12 September 1910 he took the Welsh 9 stone 4 pounds title, which resulted in an invitation to fight at the National Sporting Club in London. The next year Johns undertook more fights outside Wales, including bouts in Liverpool, and a win over American Fred Sidney at St James Hall in Newcastle.

Towards the end of 1911 his health was affected by rheumatism and defying medical orders, he continued fighting; losing to Tommy Mitchell in Sheffield and a month later he was outpointed by Nat Williams in Liverpool. Even when he took breaks from professional contests, he continued fighting in charity matches, usually with his mentor 'Peerless' Jim Driscoll. In 1913, with the now properly constituted Welsh lightweight title set at a nine stone nine pound limit, he fought Arthur Evans in a twenty-round eliminator for a shot at the current title holder, Dai Roberts. He and Evans fought in front of a crowd of 4,000 at Merthyr's Drill Hall with Johns winning by points after the bout went the full distance.

Johns' challenge against Roberts ended in farce. The twenty round bout only reached the seventeenth round after the referee, Mr J.W. Thwaites of the National Sporting Club, declared the match a 'no-contest'. He stated that the protestations from a member of Johns corner, trying to bring to his attention infringements by Roberts, distracted him so much that he was unprepared to risk his reputation by giving a verdict.

Despite being married with a family, and suffering from rheumatism, on the outbreak of the First World War Johns joined the British Army, being assigned to the Royal Engineers. In 1915, Roberts moved up to welterweight, vacating the lightweight title. This led to Johns and Arthur Evans meeting for the title on 22 May at the Cardiff Arms Park. Johns took the fight by points decision making him the Welsh lightweight champion. Johns held the title for just two months, when he again faced Evans this time at Liverpool Stadium where the two men were now stationed. The match, refereed by reigning British welterweight champion Johnny Basham, was halted in the 16th round, when Johns was unable to continue fighting after being knocked down late in the previous round.

Johns undertook one more fight after the end of the First World War, a defeat to Danny Arthurs in Merthyr. Johns died of pneumonia in Merthyr Infirmary on his birthday in 1927. He is buried at Cefn Coed Cemetery in Merthyr.

== Bibliography ==
- Jones, Gareth (2011). The Boxers of Wales: Merthyr, Aberdare & Pontypridd. Cardiff: St David's Press. ISBN 978-1-902719-29-0.
