= Mervyn Bennett (boxer) =

Welsh boxer

Personal information
- Nationality: Welsh
- Born: 20 February 1960 Cardiff, Wales
- Died: 5 November 1998 (aged 38) Cardiff, Wales
- Height: 5 ft 6 in (168 cm)
- Weight: featherweight lightweight

Boxing career

Boxing record
- Total fights: 23
- Wins: 13
- Win by KO: 5
- Losses: 10
- Draws: 0
- No contests: 0

Mervyn Roy Bennett (20 February 1960 – 5 November 1998) was a professional lightweight boxer from Wales. Born in Cardiff, Bennett was notable for becoming the Welsh lightweight champion in 1993. He successfully defended his title on one occasion before retiring from the sport in 1996.

== History ==
Bennett was a successful amateur boxer, fighting as a featherweight. In 1978, as an eighteen-year-old, he reached the final of the ABA Welsh amateur featherweight final. His opponent was Don George, who he beat on points to take the title.

Bennett turned professional in 1981 as a featherweight, and his first pro fight was at York Hall in Bethnal Green, on the undercard of the British light welterweight contest between Clinton McKenzie and Des Morrison. Bennett faced London boxer Geoff Smart in a six-round bout, and stopped his opponent via technical knockout in the final round. Bennett went on to win his next four fights before challenging Don George for the vacant Welsh area featherweight belt. Held at Ebbw Vale Leisure Centre, the bout went the full ten rounds with George declared winner on points decision. The Welsh title fight began a string of defeats which saw Bennett leave the sport in 1983, before returning in 1986.

When Bennett returned to the ring in 1986 he had moved up the weights to lightweight. His first fight at his new weight was against Dave Smith at the National Sporting Club in London. Bennett won the fight on points, and followed this up with a victory over Dave Pratt two months later. Bennett then boxed just three more times, before again taking another leave from the sport in 1987. He did not return to boxing until 1992, this time losing his opening fight, to Edward Lloyd at the National Ice Rink in Cardiff. He followed this up with two wins over Mike Morrison at the end of 1992, both on points, which led to a shot at the vacant Welsh area lightweight belt. The fight was held in Cardiff on 27 January 1993, his opponent was Swansea fighter Carl Hook. The contest was top of the bill, and the ten round bout went the full ten rounds before the decision was given to Bennett, making him the Welsh lightweight champion.

After becoming champion, Bennett fought just four more times. He beat Vince Burns by knock-out in June 1995 but then lost by points to Dean Phillips in September. In October he successfully defended his Welsh belt when he handed Monmouth based boxer, Gareth Jordan, his first defeat. Jordan, who was 11 years younger than Bennett, was expected to take the title, but Bennett produced the performance of his career to retain his title. Bennett's final fight was in March 1996, a defeat to Karl Taylor.

Bennett died in 1998, a victim of cancer.
