= Len Beynon =

Welsh boxer

Personal information
- Nationality: (United Kingdom) British
- Born: 24 April 1912 Barry, Wales
- Died: 17 August 1992 (aged 80)
- Height: 5 ft 5 in (165 cm)
- Weight: featherweight bantamweight

Boxing career

Boxing record
- Total fights: 81
- Wins: 53
- Win by KO: 13
- Losses: 26
- Draws: 1
- No contests: 1

Len Beynon (24 April 1912 – 17 August 1992) was a professional boxer from Wales. Born in Barry, Vale of Glamorgan, Beynon was notable for becoming Welsh champion at both featherweight and bantamweight.

== Bibliography ==
- Lee, Tony (2009). All in My Corner: A tribute to some forgotten Welsh boxing heroes. Ammanford: TL Associates. ISBN 978-0-9564456-0-5.
