= Eddie Thomas (boxer) =

Welsh boxer and manager (1925–1997)

Eddie Thomas MBE
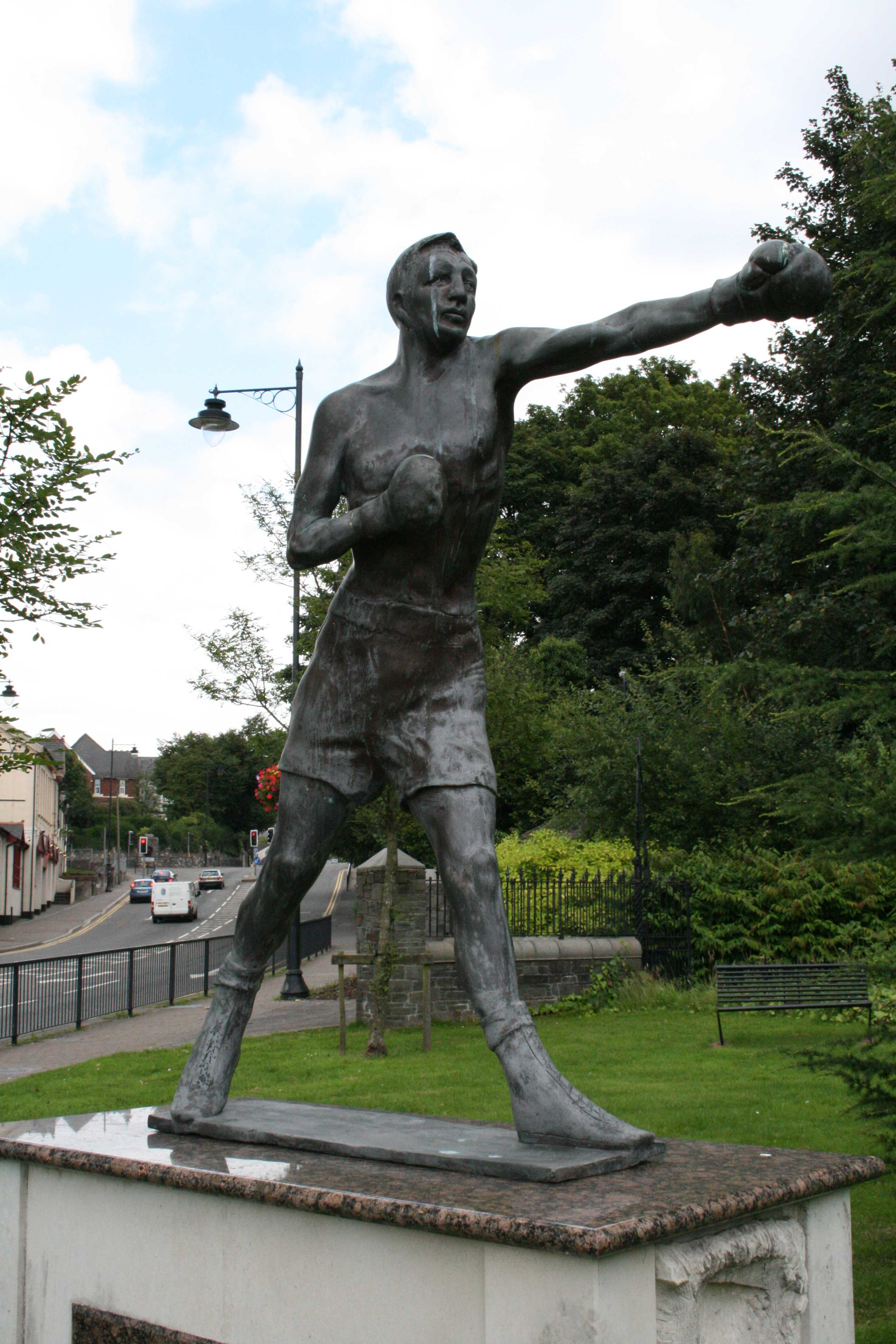
- Statue by Peter Nicholas in Bethesda Gardens, Merthyr Tydfil

Personal information
- Nickname: The Merthyr Marvel
- Nationality: (Wales) Welsh
- Born: Edward Thomas; 27 July 1925 Merthyr Tydfil, Wales
- Died: 2 June 1997 (aged 71)
- Weight: Welterweight

Boxing career

Boxing record
- Total fights: 48
- Wins: 40
- Win by KO: 13
- Losses: 6
- Draws: 2

Edward Thomas MBE (27 July 1925 – 2 June 1997) was a Welsh professional boxer and boxing manager. He was born in Merthyr Tydfil. After a highly successful amateur boxing career, he turned professional in 1946. He won the Welsh welterweight title in 1948 and the British welterweight title in 1949, becoming the first Welsh fighter to hold the belt for more than 30 years. He won the European welterweight title in 1951, retaining it for only four months. He held the British Empire title for a period in the same year.

Retiring in 1954, he became the manager of two of Britain's most successful boxing champions, Howard Winstone and Ken Buchanan, both of whom won world titles in their weight classes. He later served as mayor of Merthyr Tydfil. Thomas was appointed Member of the Order of the British Empire (MBE) in the 1984 Birthday Honours for services to boxing.

== Early life ==
Thomas was born in 11 Upper Colliers' Row, Heolgerrig, Merthyr Tydfil to Urias Thomas and his wife Mary (née Miles). Eddie was one of six sons born to the couple, his brothers were Idris, Evan John, Urias (Hugh), Ronald and Cyril. Thomas attended Heolgerrig Primary School as a child and became interested in numerous sporting activities, including boxing and football. He also joined the choir at Cyfarthfa Anglican Church.

He left school as a teenager to work in the mines at Cwmddu, alongside his father and two of his brothers. His father later lost an arm during a mining accident at the site.

== Boxing career ==
Thomas became increasingly focused on boxing as he grew up and joined Merthyr Ex-Servicemen's Amateur Boxing Club under the tutelage of Ephraim Hamer. After the end of the Second World War, Thomas won the Welsh Amateur Boxing Association lightweight title and the 1946 Amateur Boxing Association British lightweight title. He represented Wales and Great Britain on three occasions winning his bouts. Thomas boxed in 135 bouts as an amateur, losing only five. He turned professional with Jack Solomons and Sam Burns. Thomas's original opponent for his professional debut at Harringay, London, was to have been Mickey Duff, but Duff withdrew from the fight fearing he was likely to lose. Thomas won his first ten professional bouts before suffering his first defeat in September 1947, to Finnish boxer Yrjo Piitulainen due to a cut. In March 1948, he lost his second career bout to Gwyn Williams in a British title eliminator, but won a rematch against Williams six months later for the Welsh welterweight title. Seven further victories, including a victory over American Billy Graham, led to Thomas being selected to fight Henry Hall for the British welterweight title in 1949. Thomas defeated Hall on points to become the first Welsh fighter to hold the title for 34 years. He defended the title in 1950, defeating fellow Welshman Cliff Curvis.

In January 1951, Thomas won the British Empire welterweight championship by defeating South African Pat Patrick by a knock out in the 13th round. A further victory over Emmanuel Clavel led to Thomas challenging Michele Palsermk for the European title. Thomas was now the number one contender for Sugar Ray Robinson's world title. Boxing politics kept him from challenging for the title. Thomas lost the belt four months later in his first defence against Charles Humez. Thomas recovered to win his next two fights before suffering a blow when he lost both his British Empire and British titles to Wally Thom in October the same year. He struggled with weight problems after the fight and did not return to boxing for around 18 months. He fought seven further times before retiring; his last fight was a defeat to Ron Duncombe in December 1954.

== Later life ==
Thomas initially chose to move away from boxing after retirement, focusing on his mining business. However, by the end of the 1950s, Thomas had begun training young fighters in his hometown, including Howard Winstone, who won the world featherweight championship, and Ken Buchanan, who won the world lightweight championship. He later also managed Colin Jones who drew a world title bout with Milton McCrory.

Thomas's Merthyr Tydfil gym was in a building dating from 1911 that was later used by the YMCA. It was a Grade II Listed Building, but was in poor condition by the 1980s and was in danger of collapse by 2022.

Thomas was a noted member of the community in Merthyr Tydfil and was named Mayor of the town in 1994. He also served as president of Merthyr Tydfil F.C. and Georgetown Boys' Club. He married twice during his life and had five children, Edward, Lynne, Rhysian, Geraint and Delyth. He died of cancer in June 1997.

== See also ==
- List of British welterweight boxing champions
