= Jimmy Walsh (boxer) =

British boxer (1913–1964)

Personal information
- Nationality: British
- Born: 1 January 1913 Chester, England
- Died: 1 January 1964 (aged 51)
- Weight: Featherweight, lightweight

Boxing career

Boxing record
- Total fights: 94
- Wins: 71
- Win by KO: 17
- Losses: 20
- Draws: 2
- No contests: 1

Jimmy Walsh (1 January 1913 – 1 January 1964) was a British boxer who was British lightweight champion between 1936 and 1938. He should not be confused with the American World Bantamweight Champion, Jimmy Walsh.

== Career ==
Born in Chester, Walsh made his professional debut in January 1931, a win over Young Curley at Wrexham. After winning his first three fights he suffered his first loss to Frankie Brown in December 1931, losing on points over 10 rounds. Five straight wins followed in 1932, including a points win over Joe Baldersara. He had mixed results over the next year but his fights included a fifth-round knockout of Len Wickwar and a win over Welsh champion Billy Quinlan. In the latter half of 1933 he twice beat Dave Crowley and took a points decision over Aine Gyde, although he ended the year with his second defeat to Sonny Lee.

His first fight of 1934 was a non-title fight in March against British lightweight champion Harry Mizler; Walsh took a 12-round points decision. His next fight was a 15-round points loss to British featherweight champion Seaman Tommy Watson in April. He won his next six fights, including two victories over French (and future European and IBU World) champion Maurice Holtzer. He was beaten on points in October 1934 by NBA World featherweight champion Freddie Miller, but won his next three fights, leading to a British title eliminator against Jimmy Stewart in February 1935; Walsh won on points but would have to wait for his title shot.

George Daly beat him in another eliminator in July 1935 but three months later beat Belgian champion Francois Machtens. He won three and lost three of his next six fights, one of the defeats to Nel Tarleton, but in April 1936 finally got his British title shot against defending champion Jack Kid Berg at The Stadium, Liverpool. Walsh had Berg down twice in the first round, and after Berg sprained an ankle in the eighth, the fight was stopped in the ninth with Berg unable to continue.

Walsh won his next seven fights in 1936 before making the first defence of his British title against Mizler in October at the Empress Stadium, Earl's Court. The fight went the full 15 rounds, with Walsh retaining the title on points. He finished the year with wins over Benny Caplan, Aldo Linz, and George Daly.

In November 1936 a fight was agreed between Walsh and defending British Empire champion Laurie Stevens in Johannesburg, with a £1,000 stake, but the fight didn't receive BBBofC sanction and was cancelled. In December 1936 Walsh was offered a World title fight by defending champion Lou Ambers, but the fight never took place, with Ambers' demanded terms to fight in the UK described as "ridiculous" by Johnny Best of the National Sporting Club.

He fought 14 times in 1937, winning 9 (including a victories over future British welterweight champion Ernie Roderick, Dutch champion Robert Disch, and German champion Albert Esser) and losing 5 (to Wickwar, Mizler, Crowley, Phil Zwick, and George Odwell). He won his first 5 fights of 1938 before losing to Eric Boon. He made a second defence of his title in June to Crowley in June, losing it on points. Three months later he announced his retirement from boxing, although it proved to be only a temporary break.

Walsh was out of the ring until March 1939, winning on his return against Johnny Softley. He was unbeaten in four further fights, before retiring for good in 1940. A second fight against Roderick, which had been scheduled for August 1939 was postponed after Roderick suffered a cut eyelid in training.

Walsh married Mary Eileen Jones in Chester in July 1936.
