= Ronnie James =

Welsh boxer

Personal information
- Nationality: Welsh
- Born: Ronnie James; 8 October 1917 Swansea, Wales
- Died: 12 June 1977 (aged 59)
- Weight: Lightweight

Boxing career
- Stance: Orthodox

Boxing record
- Total fights: 136
- Wins: 114
- Win by KO: 61
- Losses: 17
- Draws: 5
- No contests: 0

Ronnie James (8 October 1917 – 12 June 1977) was a British Lightweight boxing champion. Born in Swansea, Wales, James had over 130 professional bouts winning 114 of them, 61 through knockout. In 1946 he challenged Ike Williams at Cardiff for the NBA Lightweight title, but lost the contest in the ninth round.

== Boxing career ==
James' first recorded professional fight was on 21 January 1936 against local fighter Sid Williams. James then went on an unbeaten run of 52 contests before being stopped by Dave Crowley at the Empire Pool on 12 January 1936. Although many of the matches in his early career were against fairly inexperienced fighters, several notable opponents were faced; including wins over Welsh champions Boyo Rees and Terence Morgan; a draw with Southern area champion Dick Corbett and a victory against future NBA World champion Jackie Wilson.

After the Crowley contest, James began to face more challenging contests on a regular basis. James fought and lost against Spaniard Baltasar Sangchili, but then knocked out fellow Welshman Phineas John in the eighth round in October 1936. These bouts were followed with another points draw with Corbett. The end of 1936 through to 1937 saw James face a dearth of experienced challengers, before he met Cuthbert Taylor at St Helen's in Swansea. The match was won by James, which was followed by another victory, this time against Douglas Kestrell. The Kestrell fight was followed by a loss to Liverpool fighter Tony Butcher, who came off a twelve-match losing streak to stop James by a technical knockout in the sixth of a twelve-round bout in the Market Hall of Haverfordwest.

James bounced back in 1938 with four straight wins, three by knockout, before being disqualified in a contest in front of his hometown against NBA ex-champion Freddie Miller of Cincinnati. He then took in ten winning bouts, most notably over Tommy Hyams and Dick Corbett, before two losses, to Dave Finn and another loss to Crowley. After losing to Crowley in April 1939, James didn't lose a fight until May 1942, including wins over both Finn and Crowley. By 1943 James was heading towards a British title fight, which had evaded him before this date. Although losing three bouts on a run on the build-up to his championship claim, one to Lefty Satan Flynn and two to Arthur Danahar, he was still allowed a shot at the title against Eric Boon. The Boon contest was for the British Lightweight title and took place on 12 August 1944 at the Cardiff Arms Park in the Welsh capital. James took the title after a tenth-round knockout. He served as a sergeant-instructor in the Army Physical Training Corps during the Second World War.

James never defended his British title but before retiring he challenged American Ike Williams for the NBA World Lightweight title. The match brought the champion to Wales, the first time a boxing title had been held in the country, taking place at Ninian Park on 9 September 1946. James was knocked out in the ninth round after suffering six knockdowns during the bout. James retired from boxing in 1947 after being beaten by a 19-year-old Cliff Curvis at the Vetch Field in Swansea. James had failed to make the 9-stone-9-pound (61 kg; 135 lb) weight limit for the challenge against Curvis, for which he was stripped of his British title, and subsequently retired from boxing.

== See also ==
- List of British lightweight boxing champions
