= Tommy Watson (boxer) =

English boxer (1908–1971)

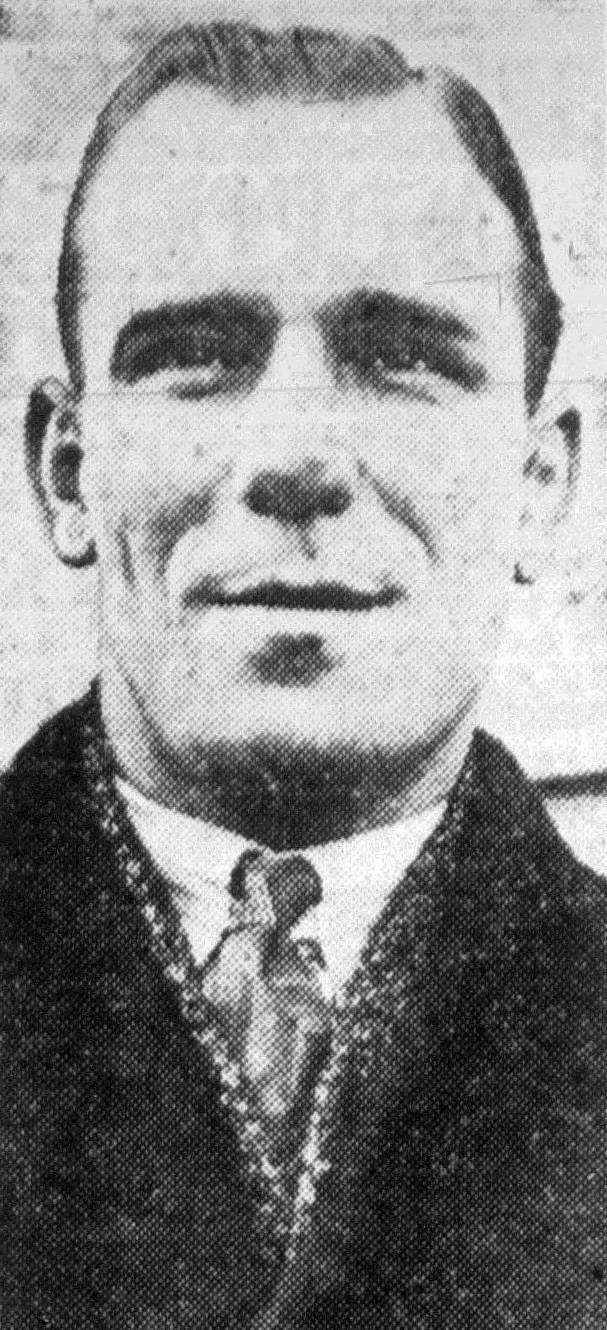
- Watson, circa 1933

Personal information
- Nickname: Seaman Watson
- Nationality: British
- Born: Thomas Watson; 2 June 1908 Newcastle upon Tyne, England
- Died: 27 January 1971 (aged 62)
- Weight: Featherweight; Lightweight

Boxing career

Boxing record
- Total fights: 123
- Wins: 112
- Win by KO: 27
- Losses: 9
- Draws: 2

Thomas Watson (2 June 1908 – 27 January 1971), better known as Tommy Watson or Seaman Watson, was an English boxer who was British featherweight champion between 1932 and 1934.

== Career ==
Born in Newcastle upon Tyne, Watson served in the Royal Navy, in which he was lightweight champion. He made his professional debut in September 1925 with a points win over Tom Pinkney. Unbeaten in his first 30 fights, he suffered his first defeat in June 1928 when he was beaten on points over 15 rounds by George Rose. Watson went another 24 fights unbeaten before meeting Rose again in March 1930, again losing on points.

Watson won his next 21 fights, including victories over Nipper Pat Daly, Auguste Gyde, and Jack Garland. In April 1931, in his 78th fight, he was stopped for the first time, by Dom Volante at the Royal Albert Hall.

Another 14 wins followed, beating the likes of Luigi Quadrini and Phineas John before finally getting a shot at the British featherweight title held by Nel Tarleton in November 1932. The two met at The Stadium, Liverpool, the fight going the full 15 rounds, with Watson getting the verdict to become British champion.

In January 1933, Watson travelled to the United States for the first time. He beat Fidel LaBarba by unanimous decision at Madison Square Garden, earning the right to meet World champion Kid Chocolate. Watson returned to England, where he again beat Gyde, before sailing again for the United States for the World title fight. In May Kid Chocolate and Watson met at Madison Square Garden with the NYSAC World featherweight title at stake. The fight went the full 15 rounds, with Kid Chocolate getting a unanimous decision to retain the title. Only a week later, Watson faced Canadian champion Bob Laurence in Toronto, winning convincingly on points.

Back in England, Watson beat Benny Sharkey before suffering only the fifth defeat of his career when he was disqualified against Sonny Lee for a low blow. He was due to face Panama Al Brown in December 1933, but after Brown pulled out, he instead faced Dave Crowley in what they hoped would be accepted as a British title defence, but the BBBofC refused to accept it as such, with two other boxers already meeting in a final eliminator. He beat Crowley, Johnny Cuthbert, and Willie Gannon, before making the first defence of his British title in March 1934 against Johnny McMillan. Watson won on points to retain the title.

After wins over Jimmy Walsh, Jim Cowie, Francois Machtens, and Dick Corbett, Watson made the second defence of his title in July 1934 against Tarleton at Anfield. Tarleton got the points decision to regain the title.

Watson moved up to lightweight in October 1934 with a win over George Odwell, and in 1935 beat Lee, Tommy Spiers, and Frankie Brown in British title eliminators, but lost a final eliminator in October to George Daly after retiring due to cut eye. Having lost three of his last four fights, two to World champion Freddie Miller, he retired from boxing.

Watson subsequently worked as a referee from 1937 until the 1950s.
