= Fen Tigers =

Fen Tigers may refer to:

== People ==
- Eric Boon (1919–1981), a British lightweight boxing champion from Chatteris, Cambridgeshire, England
- Peter Evison (born 1964), an English professional darts player
- Dave Boy Green (1953), a British welterweight boxing champion from Chatteris, Cambridgeshire, England

== Other uses ==
- Mildenhall Fen Tigers, a motorcycle speedway team from Mildenhall, Suffolk, England.
- Men who tried to prevent the draining of The Fens in the 1600s
- The Cambridgeshire Regiment and its successor D (Cambridgeshire) Coy, 6 (Vol) Bn, Royal Anglian Regiment
- The Fen Tiger, a 1963 novel by British author Catherine Marchant (Catherine Cookson)
- A British big cat first reported in 1982 in Cambridgeshire
