= Freddie Miller (boxer) =

American boxer (1911–1962)

Personal information
- Born: Frederick M. Mueller; April 3, 1911 Cincinnati, Ohio, U.S.
- Died: May 8, 1962 (aged 51) Cincinnati, Ohio, U.S.
- Height: 5 ft 5 in (1.65 m)
- Weight: Featherweight

Boxing career
- Stance: Southpaw

Boxing record
- Total fights: 251
- Wins: 211
- Win by KO: 45
- Losses: 30
- Draws: 7
- No contests: 3

Freddie Miller (April 3, 1911 – May 8, 1962) was an American boxer from Cincinnati, Ohio, who won over 200 fights and held the NBA world featherweight championship from 1933 to 1936. He was named in Ring magazine's list of the 80 Best Fighters of the Last 80 Years.

== Early life and career ==
Miller was born on April 3, 1911, in Cincinnati, Ohio. He would become known as a quick, and clever boxer with excellent ringcraft, and his southpaw stance would give him a difficult style to defend.

In one of his earlier fights against a future contender, Miller faced Phil Zwick on November 28, 1936, beating him by a fourth-round knockout on January 26, 1931, in Wheeling, West Virginia. Zwick would contend for the world featherweight title in 1941.

Miller fought Tommy Paul three times in 1931. In the first two fights, Miller beat Paul by decision in Cincinnati. In the third, Paul beat Miller by a unanimous decision in Buffalo, New York.

=== NBA world featherweight title bouts against Battling Battalino ===
On July 23, 1931, Miller had his first title shot for the National Boxing Association (NBA) World featherweight title, against Battling Battalino. Miller would go on to lose the match by a ten-round unanimous decision in Cincinnati, Ohio.

Miller went on to face Battalino on January 27, 1932, in Cincinnati for the NBA World Featherweight Title before a small crowd of 2,000 in what was one of the most peculiar fights of his career. The defending champion, Battalino, came in three pounds overweight and did not put up a good fight. Battalino went down in the third round from what the referee, Lou Bauman, and many in the crowd, considered a harmless right to the chin. Some in the crowd suspected a "fix". When Battalino arose, Miller put him down again. The referee stopped the fight and declared Miller the winner. The National Boxing Association and the New York State Athletic Commission, however, overruled the referee and declared the bout a "no contest." Having declared the bout a no contest, the title become vacant. Battalino was fined $5,000, and would later be stripped of his title by the NYSAC, taking effect on March 1, 1932. To end any confusion about his championship status, Battalino voluntarily relinquished the title by March and moved up a weightclass to fight at the lightweight limit.

== NBA world feather champion ==
On January 13, 1933, Miller fought Tommy Paul for the fourth time. Miller defeated Paul in a ten-round unanimous decision at Chicago Stadium, taking the National Boxing Association World featherweight title. In an exceptionally long reign as champion, Miller fought thirteen times in the next three years before finally losing the title to Petey Sarron on March 2, 1936. Miller successfully defended his title 12 times. He defeated Baby Arizmendi, Abie Israel in a rematch, Jackie Sharkey, Paul Dazzo, Nel Tarleton, Jose Girones, Nel Tarleton a second time, Vernon Cormier, Johnny Pena, Gene Espinosa, and Petey Sarron.

=== Defenses of the world feather title ===
While still holding the NBA world featherweight title, Miller met Baby Arizmendi, reigning California State World Featherweight champion on January 28, 1933. Miller won the ten-round match by decision at Los Angeles's Olympic Auditorium, retaining the NBA world featherweight title, and gaining the California State world featherweight title.

On March 21, 1933, Miller defeated Filipino Speedy Dado, California bantamweight champion, for the NBA world featherweight title in a ten-round points decision at Olympic Stadium in Los Angeles. Miller won seven of the ten rounds, and had Dado on the floor for a six count from a strong right to the head in the second round. Dado took only rounds three and seven.

Defending the NBA world featherweight title on July 11, 1933, Miller defeated Abie Israel in a fourth-round knockout before 7000 fans at the Civic Ice Arena in Seattle.

In an NBA world featherweight championship on January 1, 1934, Miller defeated Jackie Sharkey at Cincinnati's Music Hall Arena in a ten-round unanimous decision. Miller took his victory by a wide margin; he put Sharkey to the canvas for a count of seven with a right and left to the jaw in the second, and again for a count of seven using a left to the jaw in the tenth. Sharkey appeared to win on points only in two rounds, the fourth and the seventh.

In an NBA world featherweight title, Paul Dazzo was knocked out by Miller, 1:20 into the sixth round, at the Jefferson County Armory in Louisville, Kentucky on May 4, 1934. On the eve of the Kentucky Derby, the bout was the first world title held in the Blue Grass state since 1934. Taking an edge from the start, Dazzo was credited with the second, third, fourth, and fifth, with Dazzo holding even in the first.

==== Boxing in Europe ====
Miller went on a boxing tour of England, Wales, Scotland, Spain, France, Belgium, and Ireland, boxing in all but Scotland and Wales, including the capitals of Brussels, Belgium and Dublin, Ireland. He fought Josep Gironès twice in Barcelona, Spain on December 1, 1934, and on February 17, 1935, taking the first by a disqualification. In their second meeting, an NBA world featherweight title fight, he knocked out Josep in the first of fifteen rounds.

Miller fought the legendary reigning world bantamweight champion Panama Al Brown on December 24, 1934, in Paris, winning in a non-title ten round points decision.

In Liverpool, England, on June 12, 1935, Miller defeated Ned Tarleton, European and British featherweight champion, for the NBA world featherweight title in a fifteen-round points decision. In an easy victory, Miller floored Tarleton for a count of six in the first round, and in the official scoring won all but two rounds.

On July 12, 1935, the Cincinnati featherweight champ defeated Stan Jehu in Dublin, Ireland in a fourth-round decision.

==== Return to America ====
In his first NBA world featherweight title defense since returning from Europe, Miller met Vernon Cormier at Boston Garden on October 22, 1935, before a modest depression crowd of 4,300. Miller was credited with all but the tenth and thirteenth rounds which were taken by Cormier. There were no knockdowns in the fight, nor was either boxer staggered, and each studied technique in the long match.

In an NBA world featherweight championship on February 18, 1936, in Seattle, Miller defeated Johnny Pena in a twelfth round unanimous decision. In a decisive victory, ringside reporters credited Miller with every round in the match. He landed the only knockdown of the bout, sending Pena to the canvas for a count of nine in the eleventh. Pena had taken a previous decision over Miller in Oakland.

In one of his last defenses of the NBA world featherweight title, Miller defeated Petey Sarron, future featherweight champion, in a fifteen-round points decision in Coral Cables, Florida, on March 2, 1936. In a controversial decision, two of the six rounds given to Miller were due to Sarron fouls, which included calls for low blows in the ninth, eleventh, and twelfth rounds. In a close bout, the referee gave three rounds to Sarron, six to Miller, and called three even. If not for the low blow calls, Sarron would have taken five rounds.

=== NBA world feather title loss, May, 1936 ===
On May 11, 1936, he finally lost to Sarron for the NBA world featherweight title in a fifteen-round mixed decision at Griffith Stadium in Washington D.C. One judge ruled the bout a draw, but the other judge and referee ruled for Sarron. It was Miller's twelfth title fight since taking the title in January 1933 from Tommy Paul.

== Late career fights ==
In his fifth bout with Tommy Paul, Miller lost by disqualification at Los Angeles's Olympic Auditorium on June 19, 1934. A low blow in the second of ten rounds dislocated Paul's hip. In the sixth and last fight between them on August 3, 1934, Miller won by a ten-round points decision at Los Angeles's Legion Stadium.

Miller knocked out Phil Zwick in a match in Johannesburg, South Africa on November 28, 1936. Miller cut Zwick on the head with an accidental head butt.

He had a final rematch with Petey Sarron in a twelve-round points decision on September 4, 1937, for the National Boxing Association World featherweight title in Johannesburg, South Africa. In a slashing fight, Miller was dropped twice by Sarron, in what the Associated Press deemed "a decisive victory".

The aging ex-featherweight champion had one last title shot of his career against Leo Rodak for the Maryland State Version of the World Featherweight Title, but lost the fight by decision on October 24, 1938. The first six rounds were slow, but in the closing rounds, Rodak hammered Miller with rights and lefts to the face and body.

In his last big fight of his career Miller lost to Sammy Angott.

== Records ==
Miller fought Tommy Paul six times, the most of any boxer he faced. Miller's record against Tommy was 4–2–0.

== Life after boxing ==
Miller was married in 1931 to his wife, the former Louise Somhorst.

From 1954 to 1962 Miller worked for a field engineering crew at Hamilton County Courthouse near Cincinnati. He was one of the few boxers of the depression era who was believed to have invested his boxing earnings wisely. He died at only 51 in the early morning of May 8, 1962, of a heart attack at Cincinnati's Good Samaritan Hospital, after having been observed for several weeks for heart problems. He left his wife of 31 years, Louise, a daughter, and two grandchildren.

He was inducted into the International Boxing Hall of Fame in 1997.

== Professional boxing record ==
All information in this section is derived from BoxRec, unless otherwise stated.

=== Official record ===
251 fights	184 wins	29 losses
By knockout	45	2
By decision	136	25
By disqualification	3	2
Draws	5	
No contests	3	
Newspaper decisions/draws	30	

All newspaper decisions are officially regarded as "no decision" bouts and are not counted in the win/loss/draw column.

No.	Result	Record	Opponent	Type	Round	Date	Location	Notes
251	Loss	184–29–5 (33)	Herschel Joiner	TKO	8 (10)	Apr 1, 1940	Music Hall Arena, Cincinnati, Ohio, U.S.	
250	Loss	184–28–5 (33)	Georgie Hansford	PTS	10	Dec 1, 1939	Legion Stadium, Hollywood, California, U.S.	
249	Loss	184–27–5 (33)	Simon Chavez	PTS	10	Sep 10, 1939	Caracas, Venezuela	
248	Win	184–26–5 (33)	Baby Oriental	KO	2 (10)	May 7, 1939	Caracas, Venezuela	
247	Win	183–26–5 (33)	Enrique Chaffardet	PTS	10	Apr 23, 1939	Caracas, Venezuela	
246	Loss	182–26–5 (33)	Simon Chavez	PTS	10	Apr 9, 1939	Caracas, Venezuela	
245	Win	182–25–5 (33)	Wishy Jones	UD	10	Feb 6, 1939	Columbia Gymnasium Arena, Louisville, Kentucky, U.S.	
244	Loss	181–25–5 (33)	Emil Joseph	UD	10	Jan 23, 1939	Motor Square Garden, Pittsburgh, Pennsylvania, U.S.	
243	Loss	181–24–5 (33)	Jackie Callura	UD	10	Jan 3, 1939	Convention Hall, Rochester, New York, U.S.	
242	Loss	181–23–5 (33)	Sammy Angott	UD	10	Dec 5, 1938	Columbia Gymnasium Arena, Louisville, Kentucky, U.S.	
241	Loss	181–22–5 (33)	Leo Rodak	PTS	15	Oct 24, 1938	Turner's Arena, Washington, D.C., U.S.	For Maryland State featherweight title
240	Win	181–21–5 (33)	Johnny King	PTS	10	Sep 1, 1938	The Stadium, Liverpool, Merseyside, England, U.K.	
239	Win	180–21–5 (33)	Jack Carrick	PTS	10	Jul 21, 1938	The Stadium, Liverpool, Merseyside, England, U.K.	
238	Win	179–21–5 (33)	Ronnie James	DQ	8 (12)	Jun 27, 1938	Vetch Field, Swansea, Wales, U.K.	
237	Win	178–21–5 (33)	Billy Charlton	PTS	12	Jun 13, 1938	White City Stadium, Newcastle, Tyne and Wear, England, U.K.	
236	Win	177–21–5 (33)	Frank McCudden	PTS	12	May 26, 1938	Waverley Market, Edinburgh, Scotland, U.K.	
235	Win	176–21–5 (33)	Len Beynon	PTS	12	May 12, 1938	Vetch Field, Swansea, Wales, U.K.	
234	Win	175–21–5 (33)	Johnny Cusick	KO	7 (12)	Apr 28, 1938	The Stadium, Liverpool, Merseyside, England, U.K.	
233	Win	174–21–5 (33)	Tommy Tune	TKO	5 (12)	Apr 12, 1938	Villa Marina Ballroom, Douglas, Isle Of Man, U.K.	
232	Win	173–21–5 (33)	Tommy Hyams	KO	9 (10)	Mar 28, 1938	Colston Hall, Bristol, Avon, England, U.K.	
231	Draw	172–21–5 (33)	Paul Dogniaux	PTS	8	Mar 17, 1938	Salle Wagram, Paris, Paris, France	
230	Win	172–21–4 (33)	Billy Charlton	PTS	12	Mar 10, 1938	The Stadium, Liverpool, Merseyside, England, U.K.	
229	Win	171–21–4 (33)	Len Wickwar	PTS	12	Feb 21, 1938	Granby Halls, Leicester, Leicestershire, England, U.K.	
228	Win	170–21–4 (33)	Billy Charlton	PTS	12	Jan 27, 1938	The Stadium, Liverpool, Merseyside, England, U.K.	
227	Win	169–21–4 (33)	Aldo Spoldi	PTS	12	Nov 13, 1937	Wanderers Stadium,, Johannesburg, South Africa	
226	Win	168–21–4 (33)	Len Tiger Smith	PTS	10	Oct 16, 1937	City Hall, Johannesburg, South Africa	
225	Loss	167–21–4 (33)	Petey Sarron	PTS	12	Sep 4, 1937	Wanderers Stadium, Johannesburg, South Africa	For NBA and The Ring featherweight titles
224	Win	167–20–4 (33)	Petey Sarron	PTS	10	Jul 31, 1937	Wanderers Stadium, Johannesburg, South Africa	
223	ND	166–20–4 (33)	Alec Hannan	ND	8	Jul 17, 1937	Praça de Touros Monumental, Maputo, Mozambique	Date uncertain
222	Win	166–20–4 (32)	Freddie 'Red' Cochrane	PTS	8	Jun 7, 1937	Dexter Park Arena, Woodhaven, New York City, New York, U.S.	
221	Win	165–20–4 (32)	Maxie Fisher	PTS	8	May 17, 1937	Dexter Park Arena, Woodhaven, New York City, New York, U.S.	
220	Loss	164–20–4 (32)	Jackie Wilson	SD	10	Apr 26, 1937	Music Hall Arena, Cincinnati, Ohio, U.S.	
219	Win	164–19–4 (32)	Dominic Mancini	PTS	10	Apr 12, 1937	Columbia Gymnasium Arena, Louisville, Kentucky, U.S.	
218	Draw	163–19–4 (32)	Lew Feldman	PTS	8	Apr 6, 1937	New York Coliseum, New York City, New York, U.S.	
217	Loss	163–19–3 (32)	Norment Quarles	SD	10	Mar 22, 1937	Music Hall Arena, Cincinnati, Ohio, U.S.	
216	Loss	163–18–3 (32)	Jackie Wilson	MD	10	Feb 9, 1937	Motor Square Garden, Pittsburgh, Pennsylvania, U.S.	
215	Win	163–17–3 (32)	Joey Temmes	PTS	10	Feb 1, 1937	Turner's Arena, Washington, D.C., U.S.	
214	Win	162–17–3 (32)	Dave Finn	TKO	5 (10)	Jan 18, 1937	Columbia Gymnasium Arena, Louisville, Kentucky, U.S.	
213	Win	161–17–3 (32)	Jimmy Vaughn	PTS	10	Jan 11, 1937	Columbia Gymnasium Arena, Louisville, Kentucky, U.S.	
212	Win	160–17–3 (32)	Frankie Covelli	SD	10	Jan 6, 1937	Ohio National Guard Armory, Cincinnati, Ohio, U.S.	
211	Win	159–17–3 (32)	Phil Zwick	TKO	4 (10)	Nov 28, 1936	Wanderers Stadium, Johannesburg, South Africa	
210	Win	158–17–3 (32)	Willie Smith	KO	6 (12)	Nov 21, 1936	City Hall, Durban, KwaZulu-Natal, South Africa	
209	Win	157–17–3 (32)	Maurice Holtzer	PTS	12	Oct 24, 1936	Wembley Stadium, Johannesburg, Gauteng, South Africa	
208	Win	156–17–3 (32)	Willie Smith	KO	6 (12)	Oct 10, 1936	Wembley Stadium, Johannesburg, Gauteng, South Africa	
207	Win	155–17–3 (32)	Jimmy Buckler	UD	10	Jul 13, 1936	Swiss Park Open Air Arena, Louisville, Kentucky, U.S.	
206	Win	154–17–3 (32)	Everette Rightmire	UD	10	Jun 24, 1936	Municipal Auditorium, Kansas City, Missouri, U.S.	
205	Loss	153–17–3 (32)	Jimmy Vaughn	SD	10	May 27, 1936	Parkway Arena, Cincinnati, Ohio, U.S.	
204	Loss	153–16–3 (32)	Petey Sarron	MD	15	May 11, 1936	Griffith Stadium, Washington, D.C., U.S.	Lost NBA and The Ring featherweight titles
203	Win	153–15–3 (32)	Andy Martin	NWS	10	Mar 20, 1936	City Auditorium, Birmingham, Alabama, U.S.	
202	Win	153–15–3 (31)	Fillo Echevarria	PTS	10	Mar 14, 1936	Arena Cristal, Havana, Cuba	
201	Win	152–15–3 (31)	Petey Sarron	PTS	15	Mar 2, 1936	Coliseum, Coral Gables, Florida, U.S.	Retained NBA and The Ring featherweight titles
200	Win	151–15–3 (31)	Johnny Pena	UD	12	Feb 18, 1936	Crystal Pool, Seattle, Washington, U.S.	Retained NBA and The Ring featherweight titles
199	Win	150–15–3 (31)	Bobby Gray	KO	1 (10)	Feb 11, 1936	San Jose, California, U.S.	
198	Win	149–15–3 (31)	Cecil Payne	MD	10	Jan 28, 1936	Crystal Pool, Seattle, Washington, U.S.	
197	Loss	148–15–3 (31)	Johnny Pena	PTS	10	Jan 15, 1936	Auditorium, Oakland, California, U.S.	
196	Loss	148–14–3 (31)	Rodolfo Casanova	UD	10	Jan 1, 1936	El Toreo de Cuatro Caminos, Mexico City, Distrito Federal, Mexico	
195	Win	148–13–3 (31)	Claude Varner	UD	10	Dec 11, 1935	Music Hall Arena, Cincinnati, Ohio, U.S.	
194	Win	147–13–3 (31)	Jimmy Christy	PTS	10	Nov 29, 1935	Chicago Stadium, Chicago, Illinois, U.S.	
193	Loss	146–13–3 (31)	Norment Quarles	SD	10	Nov 18, 1935	Northside Arena, Pittsburgh, Pennsylvania, U.S.	
192	Win	146–12–3 (31)	Roger Bernard	PTS	10	Nov 13, 1935	Maple Leaf Gardens, Toronto, Ontario, Canada	
191	Win	145–12–3 (31)	Claude Varner	PTS	10	Nov 6, 1935	Music Hall Arena, Cincinnati, Ohio, U.S.	
190	Win	144–12–3 (31)	Vernon Cormier	UD	15	Oct 22, 1935	Boston Garden, Boston, Massachusetts, U.S.	Retained NBA and The Ring featherweight titles
189	Win	143–12–3 (31)	Paul "Tennessee" Lee	PTS	10	Oct 11, 1935	Armory, Indianapolis, Indiana, U.S.	
188	Win	142–12–3 (31)	Willie Davies	PTS	10	Sep 20, 1935	Patterson Blvd. Arena, Dayton, Ohio, U.S.	
187	Win	141–12–3 (31)	Cecil Payne	UD	10	Sep 16, 1935	Jefferson County Armory, Louisville, Kentucky, U.S.	
186	Win	140–12–3 (31)	Eddie Zivic	PTS	10	Sep 9, 1935	Duquesne Garden, Pittsburgh, Pennsylvania, U.S.	
185	Win	139–12–3 (31)	Al Hamilton	PTS	10	Aug 28, 1935	Parkway Arena, Cincinnati, Ohio, U.S.	
184	Win	138–12–3 (31)	Roger Bernard	UD	10	Aug 20, 1935	Northside Ballpark, Cincinnati, Ohio, U.S.	
183	Win	137–12–3 (31)	Seaman Tommy Watson	KO	2 (10)	Jul 25, 1935	Anfield Football Ground, Liverpool, Merseyside, England, U.K.	
182	Win	136–12–3 (31)	Stan Jehu	RTD	4 (10)	Jul 12, 1935	Dalymount Park, Dublin, Ireland	
181	Win	135–12–3 (31)	Seaman Tommy Watson	PTS	10	Jun 27, 1935	Anfield Football Ground, Liverpool, Merseyside, England, U.K.	
180	Win	134–12–3 (31)	Nel Tarleton	PTS	15	Jun 12, 1935	Stanley Greyhound Track, Liverpool, Merseyside, England, U.K.	Retained NBA and The Ring featherweight titles
179	Win	133–12–3 (31)	Jimmy Walsh	PTS	10	May 23, 1935	The Stadium, Liverpool, Merseyside, England, U.K.	
178	Win	132–12–3 (31)	Johnny Cruz	KO	7 (10)	Apr 21, 1935	Plaza de Toros del Coliseo Balear, Palma de Mallorca, Islas Baleares, Spain	
177	Win	131–12–3 (31)	Jimmy Stewart	PTS	10	Apr 11, 1935	The Stadium, Liverpool, Merseyside, England, U.K.	
176	Win	130–12–3 (31)	Jose Mico	KO	3 (10)	Apr 3, 1935	Teatro Circo Price, Madrid, Comunidad de Madrid, Spain	
175	Win	129–12–3 (31)	Luigi Quadrini	PTS	10	Mar 27, 1935	Teatro Circo Olympia, Barcelona, Cataluña, Spain	
174	Win	128–12–3 (31)	Harry Brooks	KO	7 (10)	Mar 24, 1935	The Ring, Blackfriars Road, Southwark, London, England, U.K.	
173	Win	127–12–3 (31)	Javier Torres	RTD	6 (10)	Mar 14, 1935	Teatro Circo Olympia, Barcelona, Cataluña, Spain	
172	Win	126–12–3 (31)	Johnny Edwards	PTS	10	Mar 11, 1935	Palais des Sports, Paris, Paris, France	
171	Win	125–12–3 (31)	Stan Jehu	PTS	10	Mar 3, 1935	Pavilion Theatre Arena, Whitechapel, London, England, U.K.	
170	Win	124–12–3 (31)	Johnny Peters	TKO	4 (12)	Feb 28, 1935	The Stadium, Liverpool, Merseyside, England, U.K.	
169	Win	123–12–3 (31)	Douglas Kestrell	PTS	8	Feb 26, 1935	Ulster Hall, Belfast, Northern Ireland, U.K.	
168	Win	122–12–3 (31)	Benny Caplan	PTS	10	Feb 24, 1935	The Ring, Blackfriars Road, Southwark, London, England, U.K.	
167	Win	121–12–3 (31)	José Girones	KO	1 (15)	Feb 17, 1935	Palais des Sports, Paris, Paris, France	Retained NBA and The Ring featherweight titles
166	Loss	120–12–3 (31)	Maurice Holtzer	PTS	10	Feb 11, 1935	Palais des Sports, Paris, Paris, France	
165	Win	120–11–3 (31)	Frans Machtens	UD	10	Jan 26, 1935	Palais des Sports, Schaerbeek, Bruxelles-Capitale, Belgium	
164	Draw	119–11–3 (31)	Benny Caplan	PTS	10	Jan 20, 1935	The Ring, Blackfriars Road, Southwark, London, England, U.K.	
163	Win	119–11–2 (31)	Tommy Rogers	PTS	12	Jan 14, 1935	Embassy Rink, Sparbrook, West Midlands, England, U.K.	
162	Win	118–11–2 (31)	Joe Young Connelly	PTS	10	Jan 6, 1935	The Ring, Blackfriars Road, Southwark, London, England, U.K.	
161	Win	117–11–2 (31)	Francis Augier	KO	7 (10)	Jan 4, 1935	Salle Wagram, Paris, Paris, France	
160	Win	116–11–2 (31)	Panama Al Brown	UD	10	Dec 24, 1934	Palais des Sports, Paris, Paris, France	
159	Win	115–11–2 (31)	Cuthbert Taylor	PTS	12	Dec 6, 1934	The Stadium, Liverpool, England, U.K.	
158	Win	114–11–2 (31)	Jose Girones	DQ	5 (10)	Dec 1, 1934	Teatro Circo Olympia, Barcelona, Cataluña, Spain	Girones was disqualified for hitting low
157	Win	113–11–2 (31)	Johnny Cuthbert	KO	2 (12)	Nov 22, 1934	The Stadium, Liverpool, England, U.K.	
156	Win	112–11–2 (31)	Gilbert Johnstone	DQ	10 (10)	Oct 25, 1934	Adelphi SC, Glasgow, Scotland, U.K.	
155	ND	111–11–2 (31)	Cuthbert Taylor	ND	6	Oct 20, 1934	Workingmens' Institute, Llanelli, Wales, U.K.	
154	Win	111–11–2 (30)	Jimmy Walsh	PTS	12	Oct 18, 1934	The Stadium, Liverpool, England, U.K.	
153	Loss	110–11–2 (30)	Willie Gannon	DQ	6 (10)	Oct 8, 1934	King's Hall, Belle Vue, Manchester, Lancashire, England, U.K.	Miller dropped Gannon with a left to the body in the first round but was later disqualified for a low blow
152	Win	110–10–2 (30)	Benny Sharkey	KO	1 (12)	Oct 8, 1934	Newcastle, Tyne and Wear, England, U.K.	
151	Win	109–10–2 (30)	Dave Crowley	PTS	10	Oct 1, 1934	Royal Albert Hall, Kensington, London, England, U.K.	
150	Win	108–10–2 (30)	Billy Hazel	KO	5 (10)	Sep 24, 1934	Anfield Football Ground, Liverpool, Merseyside, England, U.K.	
149	Win	107–10–2 (30)	Nel Tarleton	PTS	15	Sep 20, 1934	Anfield Football Ground, Liverpool, Merseyside, England, U.K.	Retained NBA and The Ring featherweight titles
148	Win	106–10–2 (30)	Little Dempsey	PTS	10	Aug 10, 1934	Salinas A.C., Salinas, California, U.S.	
147	Win	105–10–2 (30)	Tommy Paul	PTS	10	Aug 3, 1934	Legion Stadium, Hollywood, California, U.S.	
146	Win	104–10–2 (30)	Clever Sison	PTS	10	Jul 20, 1934	Pismo Beach Arena, Pismo Beach, California, U.S.	
145	Win	103–10–2 (30)	Gene Espinosa	KO	8 (10)	Jul 13, 1934	Civic Auditorium, Watsonville, California, U.S.	Retained NBA and The Ring featherweight titles
144	Win	102–10–2 (30)	Georgie Hansford	PTS	10	Jun 29, 1934	Legion Stadium, Hollywood, California, U.S.	
143	Loss	101–10–2 (30)	Tommy Paul	DQ	2 (10)	Jun 19, 1934	Olympic Auditorium, Los Angeles, California, U.S.	Miller was disqualified for a low-blow that dislocated Paul's hip
142	Win	101–9–2 (30)	Chalky Wright	PTS	8	Jun 8, 1934	El Centro A.C., El Centro, California, U.S.	
141	Win	100–9–2 (30)	Rodolfo Casanova	PTS	10	May 29, 1934	Olympic Auditorium, Los Angeles, California, U.S.	
140	Win	99–9–2 (30)	Paul Dazzo	KO	6 (15)	May 4, 1934	Jefferson County Armory, Louisville, Kentucky, U.S.	Retained NBA and The Ring featherweight titles
139	Win	98–9–2 (30)	Jackie Sharkey	UD	10	Apr 13, 1934	Auditorium, Minneapolis, Minnesota, U.S.	
138	Win	97–9–2 (30)	Moon Mullins	PTS	10	Apr 3, 1934	Coliseum, Vincennes, Indiana, U.S.	
137	Win	96–9–2 (30)	Mose Butch	UD	10	Mar 19, 1934	Motor Square Garden, Pittsburgh, Pennsylvania, U.S.	
136	Win	95–9–2 (30)	Petey Sarron	PTS	10	Feb 7, 1934	Music Hall Arena, Cincinnati, Ohio, U.S.	
135	Win	94–9–2 (30)	Frankie Covelli	PTS	10	Jan 31, 1934	Broadway Arena, New York City, New York, U.S.	
134	Win	93–9–2 (30)	Roger Bernard	PTS	10	Jan 15, 1934	Flint, Michigan, U.S.	
133	Win	92–9–2 (30)	Jackie Sharkey	UD	10	Jan 1, 1934	Music Hall Arena, Cincinnati, Ohio, U.S.	Retained NBA and The Ring featherweight titles
132	Win	91–9–2 (30)	Sammy Levine	PTS	10	Dec 20, 1933	Arcadia Gardens, Chicago, Illinois, U.S.	
131	Win	90–9–2 (30)	Paul Dazzo	PTS	10	Dec 6, 1933	Arcadia Gardens, Chicago, Illinois, U.S.	
130	Win	89–9–2 (30)	Lew Feldman	UD	10	Nov 14, 1933	Ridgewood Grove, New York City, New York, U.S.	
129	Win	88–9–2 (30)	Petey Sarron	UD	10	Nov 1, 1933	Portner's Arena, Alexandria, Virginia, U.S.	
128	Win	87–9–2 (30)	Jackie Sharkey	PTS	10	Oct 23, 1933	Auditorium, Milwaukee, Wisconsin, U.S.	
127	Loss	86–9–2 (30)	Frankie Wallace	SD	10	Sep 26, 1933	Coliseum, Cleveland, Ohio, U.S.	
126	Win	86–8–2 (30)	Lew Feldman	PTS	10	Sep 1, 1933	Parkway Arena, Cincinnati, Ohio, U.S.	
125	Win	85–8–2 (30)	Abie Israel	KO	4 (15)	Jul 11, 1933	Civic Ice Arena, Seattle, Washington, U.S.	Retained NBA featherweight title
124	Loss	84–8–2 (30)	Baby Arizmendi	PTS	10	Jun 12, 1933	Exposition Auditorium, San Francisco, California, U.S.	
123	Win	84–7–2 (30)	Joe Guerrero	PTS	6	May 24, 1933	Pico Arena, Pico, California, U.S.	
122	Win	83–7–2 (30)	Eddie Trujillo	PTS	10	May 12, 1933	Legion Stadium, Hollywood, California, U.S.	
121	Win	82–7–2 (30)	Johnny Gonzales	KO	4 (10)	Apr 26, 1933	Wilmington Bowl, Wilmington, California, U.S.	
120	Loss	81–7–2 (30)	Abie Israel	PTS	6	Apr 18, 1933	Civic Ice Arena, Seattle, Washington, U.S.	
119	Win	81–6–2 (30)	Andy Bundy	PTS	10	Apr 11, 1933	Auditorium, Portland, Oregon, U.S.	
118	Win	80–6–2 (30)	Cecil Payne	PTS	10	Apr 4, 1933	Olympic Auditorium, Los Angeles, California, U.S.	
117	Win	79–6–2 (30)	Speedy Dado	PTS	10	Mar 21, 1933	Olympic Auditorium, Los Angeles, California, U.S.	Retained NBA featherweight title
116	Win	78–6–2 (30)	Little Dempsey	PTS	10	Mar 9, 1933	Memorial Auditorium, Sacramento, California, U.S.	
115	Win	77–6–2 (30)	Baby Arizmendi	PTS	10	Feb 28, 1933	Olympic Auditorium, Los Angeles, California, U.S.	Retained NBA featherweight title; Won California State featherweight title
114	Win	76–6–2 (30)	Tommy Paul	SD	10	Jan 13, 1933	Chicago Stadium, Chicago, Illinois, U.S.	Won NBA featherweight title
113	Win	75–6–2 (30)	Jackie Sharkey	PTS	10	Dec 29, 1932	Chicago Stadium, Chicago, Illinois, U.S.	
112	Draw	74–6–2 (30)	Frankie Wallace	PTS	10	Aug 31, 1932	Parkway Arena, Cincinnati, Ohio, U.S.	For vacant USA Ohio State featherweight title
111	Win	74–6–1 (30)	Hymie Wiseman	PTS	8	Aug 4, 1932	Chicago Stadium, Chicago, Illinois, U.S.	
110	Win	73–6–1 (30)	Nat Suess	TKO	6 (?)	Jun 29, 1932	Coney Island Stadium, New York City, New York, U.S.	
109	Win	72–6–1 (30)	Frankie Wallace	UD	10	Jun 22, 1932	Parkway Arena, Cincinnati, Ohio, U.S.	
108	Win	71–6–1 (30)	Johnny Dunn	PTS	8	May 13, 1932	Olympia Stadium, Detroit, Michigan, U.S.	
107	Win	70–6–1 (30)	Ray Meyers	PTS	10	May 2, 1932	St. Nicholas Arena, New York City, New York, U.S.	
106	Loss	69–6–1 (30)	Frankie Wallace	PTS	10	Apr 8, 1932	Olympia Stadium, Detroit, Michigan, U.S.	
105	Win	69–5–1 (30)	Johnny Kaiser	PTS	10	Mar 22, 1932	Coliseum, Saint Louis, Missouri, U.S.	
104	Win	68–5–1 (30)	Johnny Datto	PTS	10	Feb 24, 1932	Coliseum, Saint Louis, Missouri, U.S.	
103	Win	67–5–1 (30)	Miki Gelb	PTS	10	Feb 19, 1932	Olympia Stadium, Detroit, Michigan, U.S.	
102	Win	66–5–1 (30)	Joe Ghnouly	UD	10	Feb 9, 1932	Coliseum, Saint Louis, Missouri, U.S.	
101	NC	65–5–1 (30)	Battling Battalino	NC	3 (10)	Jan 27, 1932	Music Hall Arena, Cincinnati, Ohio, U.S.	NBA and The Ring featherweight titles at stake; Battalino missed weight and was down in the third from a blow deemed to be too light by the ref and was deemed to be faking.
100	Win	65–5–1 (29)	Johnny Datto	PTS	10	Jan 13, 1932	Music Hall Arena, Cincinnati, Ohio, U.S.	
99	Win	64–5–1 (29)	Ray Meyers	PTS	8	Dec 21, 1931	New Lenox S.C., New York City, New York, U.S.	
98	Win	63–5–1 (29)	Lew Feldman	SD	8	Dec 11, 1931	Madison Square Garden, New York City, New York, U.S.	
97	Win	62–5–1 (29)	Billy Shaw	SD	10	Nov 30, 1931	Armory, Sidney, Ohio, U.S.	
96	Loss	61–5–1 (29)	Tommy Paul	UD	10	Aug 31, 1931	Broadway Auditorium, Buffalo, New York, U.S.	
95	Win	61–4–1 (29)	Emil Paluso	UD	10	Aug 24, 1931	Redland Field, Cincinnati, Ohio, U.S.	
94	Loss	60–4–1 (29)	Battling Battalino	UD	10	Jul 23, 1931	Redland Field, Cincinnati, Ohio, U.S.	For NYSAC, NBA, and The Ring featherweight titles
93	Win	60–3–1 (29)	Eddie Shea	UD	10	Jun 11, 1931	Redland Field, Cincinnati, Ohio, U.S.	
92	Win	59–3–1 (29)	Billy Shaw	PTS	10	Jun 1, 1931	Ye Towne Hall, Portsmouth, Ohio, U.S.	
91	Win	58–3–1 (29)	Tommy Paul	PTS	10	Apr 13, 1931	Music Hall Arena, Cincinnati, Ohio, U.S.	
90	Win	57–3–1 (29)	Manuel Castro	PTS	10	Mar 30, 1931	Memorial Hall, Dayton, Ohio, U.S.	
89	Win	56–3–1 (29)	Johnny Farr	PTS	10	Mar 26, 1931	Music Hall Arena, Cincinnati, Ohio, U.S.	
88	Win	55–3–1 (29)	Tommy Paul	PTS	10	Mar 5, 1931	Music Hall Arena, Cincinnati, Ohio, U.S.	
87	Win	54–3–1 (29)	Phil Zwick	KO	3 (10)	Jan 26, 1931	Wheeling, West Virginia, U.S.	
86	Win	53–3–1 (29)	Roger Bernard	UD	10	Jan 1, 1931	Music Hall Arena, Cincinnati, Ohio, U.S.	
85	Win	52–3–1 (29)	Babe Ruth	KO	2 (10)	Dec 8, 1930	Jefferson County Armory, Louisville, Kentucky, U.S.	
84	Loss	51–3–1 (29)	Johnny Farr	PTS	10	Nov 13, 1930	Music Hall Arena, Cincinnati, Ohio, U.S.	
83	Win	51–2–1 (29)	Babe Ruth	NWS	10	Oct 27, 1930	Wheeling, Ohio, U.S.	
82	Win	51–2–1 (28)	Johnny Farr	UD	10	Oct 2, 1930	Ohio National Guard Armory, Cincinnati, Ohio, U.S.	
81	Win	50–2–1 (28)	Cecil Payne	PTS	10	Sep 16, 1930	Redland Field, Cincinnati, Ohio, U.S.	
80	Win	49–2–1 (28)	Babe Ruth	PTS	10	Sep 4, 1930	Haft's Acre, Columbus, Ohio, U.S.	
79	Win	48–2–1 (28)	Joe Marciente	UD	10	Aug 21, 1930	Redland Field, Cincinnati, Ohio, U.S.	
78	Win	47–2–1 (28)	Henry Falegano	PTS	10	Jul 31, 1930	Redland Field, Cincinnati, Ohio, U.S.	
77	Draw	46–2–1 (28)	Bushy Graham	PTS	10	Jan 29, 1930	Music Hall Arena, Cincinnati, Ohio, U.S.	
76	Win	46–2 (28)	Willy Michel	KO	4 (10)	Jan 1, 1930	Music Hall Arena, Cincinnati, Ohio, U.S.	
75	Win	45–2 (28)	Steve Smith	UD	10	Dec 11, 1929	Music Hall Arena, Cincinnati, Ohio, U.S.	
74	Win	44–2 (28)	Steve Smith	UD	10	Nov 6, 1929	Music Hall Arena, Cincinnati, Ohio, U.S.	
73	Win	43–2 (28)	Al Crisp	UD	10	Oct 9, 1929	Music Hall Arena, Cincinnati, Ohio, U.S.	
72	Win	42–2 (28)	Midget Mike O'Dowd	UD	10	Sep 9, 1929	Redland Field, Cincinnati, Ohio, U.S.	Retained USA Ohio State lightweight title
71	Win	41–2 (28)	Midget Mike O'Dowd	UD	10	Aug 27, 1929	Redland Field, Cincinnati, Ohio, U.S.	Retained USA Ohio State lightweight title
70	Win	40–2 (28)	Harry Forbes	UD	10	Aug 6, 1929	Redland Field, Cincinnati, Ohio, U.S.	Retained Greater Cincinnati lightweight title
69	Win	39–2 (28)	Babe Kellar	PTS	10	Jul 2, 1929	Redland Field, Cincinnati, Ohio, U.S.	
68	Win	38–2 (28)	Eddie O'Dowd	UD	10	Jun 11, 1929	Redland Field, Cincinnati, Ohio, U.S.	
67	Win	37–2 (28)	Babe Kellar	UD	10	May 6, 1929	Ohio National Guard Armory, Cincinnati, Ohio, U.S.	Won USA Ohio State featherweight title
66	Win	36–2 (28)	Babe Ruth	UD	10	Apr 17, 1929	Music Hall Arena, Cincinnati, Ohio, U.S.	
65	Win	35–2 (28)	Johnny Brown	PTS	10	Mar 27, 1929	Music Hall Arena, Cincinnati, Ohio, U.S.	Retained Greater Cincinnati lightweight title
64	Win	34–2 (28)	Harry McCarthy	KO	7 (10)	Mar 7, 1929	Music Hall Arena, Cincinnati, Ohio, U.S.	Retained Greater Cincinnati lightweight title
63	Win	33–2 (28)	Joe Paglina	UD	8	Feb 6, 1929	Music Hall Arena, Cincinnati, Ohio, U.S.	
62	Win	32–2 (28)	Johnny Brown	PTS	10	Jan 23, 1929	Music Hall Arena, Cincinnati, Ohio, U.S.	Retained Greater Cincinnati lightweight title
61	Win	31–2 (28)	Cecil Payne	PTS	10	Jan 1, 1929	Music Hall Arena, Cincinnati, Ohio, U.S.	Retained Greater Cincinnati lightweight title
60	Win	30–2 (28)	Stanley Williams	PTS	6	Dec 22, 1928	Ohio National Guard Armory, Cincinnati, Ohio, U.S.	
59	Win	29–2 (28)	Jess McMurtry	KO	2 (10)	Dec 10, 1928	Armory, Marietta, Ohio, U.S.	
58	Win	28–2 (28)	Cecil Payne	NWS	6	Dec 1, 1928	Ohio National Guard Armory, Cincinnati, Ohio, U.S.	
57	Win	28–2 (27)	King Cole	KO	4 (?)	Nov 11, 1928	Middletown, Ohio, U.S.	
56	Win	27–2 (27)	Babe Peleco	PTS	10	Oct 29, 1928	Baesman Hall, Portsmouth, Ohio, U.S.	
55	Win	26–2 (27)	Eddie Morgan	NWS	8	Oct 22, 1928	Tacoma Skating Rink, Dayton, Ohio, U.S.	
54	Win	26–2 (26)	Andy Stahura	NWS	10	Oct 16, 1928	Soldiers Arena, Fort Thomas, Kentucky, U.S.	
53	Win	26–2 (25)	Ray Kirkpatrick	KO	5 (6)	Oct 9, 1928	Soldiers Arena, Fort Thomas, Kentucky, U.S.	
52	Win	25–2 (25)	Phil O'Dowd	NWS	10	Oct 2, 1928	Soldiers Arena, Fort Thomas, Kentucky, U.S.	
51	Win	25–2 (24)	Jimmy Harris	PTS	10	Sep 17, 1928	Redland Field, Cincinnati, Ohio, U.S.	Retained Greater Cincinnati lightweight title
50	Win	24–2 (24)	Al Dundee	PTS	10	Aug 27, 1928	Baesman Hall, Portsmouth, Ohio, U.S.	
49	Win	23–2 (24)	Jimmy Harris	PTS	6	Aug 20, 1928	Redland Field, Cincinnati, Ohio, U.S.	Retained Cincinnati City lightweight title
48	Win	22–2 (24)	Eddie Klusman	PTS	10	Aug 8, 1928	Middletown, Ohio, U.S.	Exact date unknown
47	Win	21–2 (24)	Windy Meyers	PTS	6	Jul 23, 1928	Redland Field, Cincinnati, Ohio, U.S.	
46	Win	20–2 (24)	Buddy Bezenah	NWS	6	Jun 27, 1928	Tacoma Bowl, Dayton, Ohio, U.S.	
45	Win	20–2 (23)	Jimmy Harris	NWS	10	Jun 14, 1928	Outdoor Arena, Fort Thomas, Kentucky, U.S.	Greater Cincinnati featherweight title
44	Win	20–2 (22)	Eddie Klusman	PTS	6	Jun 6, 1928	Middletown, Ohio, U.S.	
43	Win	19–2 (22)	Kid Hickman	KO	3 (6)	May 25, 1928	Armory, Washington Court House, Ohio, U.S.	
42	Win	18–2 (22)	King Cole	TKO	3 (8)	May 10, 1928	Armory, Washington Court House, Ohio, U.S.	
41	Win	17–2 (22)	Louis D'Arco	NWS	6	May 5, 1928	Ohio National Guard Armory, Cincinnati, Ohio, U.S.	
40	Win	17–2 (21)	Howard Jones	NWS	6	Apr 26, 1928	Soldiers Arena, Fort Thomas, Kentucky, U.S.	
39	Win	17–2 (20)	Young Fisher	KO	2 (8)	Apr 20, 1928	Armory, Washington Court House, Ohio, U.S.	
38	Win	16–2 (20)	Red Wise	NWS	6	Apr 5, 1928	Soldiers Arena, Fort Thomas, Kentucky, U.S.	
37	Draw	16–2 (19)	Chet Smallwood	NWS	6	Mar 31, 1928	Ohio National Guard Armory, Cincinnati, Ohio, U.S.	
36	Win	16–2 (18)	Jimmy Sanzone	NWS	10	Mar 22, 1928	Soldiers Arena, Fort Thomas, Kentucky, U.S.	
35	Win	16–2 (17)	Lon Lovelace	PTS	6	Mar 10, 1928	Ohio National Guard Armory, Cincinnati, Ohio, U.S.	
34	Win	15–2 (17)	Eddie Jackson	KO	5 (?)	Mar 3, 1928	Middletown, Ohio, U.S.	Date uncertain
33	Win	14–2 (17)	Ray Van Hook	PTS	6	Feb 25, 1928	Ohio National Guard Armory, Cincinnati, Ohio, U.S.	
32	Win	13–2 (17)	Buddy Bezenah	PTS	6	Feb 11, 1928	Ohio National Guard Armory, Cincinnati, Ohio, U.S.	
31	Win	12–2 (17)	Red Wise	PTS	8	Feb 2, 1928	Armory, Washington Court House, Ohio, U.S.	
30	Win	11–2 (17)	Kid Ritchie	NWS	6	Jan 26, 1928	Soldiers Arena, Fort Thomas, Kentucky, U.S.	
29	Win	11–2 (16)	Lightning Wells	KO	2 (?)	Jan 1, 1928	Middletown, Ohio, U.S.	Exact date unknown
28	Loss	10–2 (16)	Jimmy Harris	NWS	10	Dec 22, 1927	Soldiers Arena, Fort Thomas, Kentucky, U.S.	City of Cincinnati featherweight title
27	Win	10–2 (15)	Jimmy Harris	NWS	10	Dec 1, 1927	Soldiers Arena, Fort Thomas, Kentucky, U.S.	Won vacant Greater Cincinnati featherweight title
26	Win	10–2 (14)	Al Proctor	NWS	6	Nov 17, 1927	Armory, Hamilton, Ohio, U.S.	
25	Win	10–2 (13)	Eddie Klusman	PTS	4	Nov 11, 1927	Weller Theater, Zanesville, Ohio, U.S.	
24	Win	9–2 (13)	Buddy Bezenah	NWS	6	Nov 5, 1927	Ohio National Guard Armory, Cincinnati, Ohio, U.S.	
23	Win	9–2 (12)	Red Wise	NWS	6	Oct 26, 1927	Tacoma Skating Rink, Dayton, Ohio, U.S.	
22	Win	9–2 (11)	Howard Jones	NWS	6	Oct 22, 1927	Ohio National Guard Armory, Cincinnati, Ohio, U.S.	
21	Win	9–2 (10)	Jimmy Brown	NWS	8	Oct 20, 1927	Soldiers Arena, Fort Thomas, Kentucky, U.S.	
20	Win	9–2 (9)	Johnny Sauter	KO	3 (6)	Oct 12, 1927	Tacoma Skating Rink, Dayton, Ohio, U.S.	
19	Win	8–2 (9)	Al Proctor	NWS	6	Oct 6, 1927	Soldiers Arena, Fort Thomas, Kentucky, U.S.	
18	Win	8–2 (8)	Charley Court	NWS	8	Sep 22, 1927	Soldiers Arena, Fort Thomas, Kentucky, U.S.	
17	Win	8–2 (7)	Kid Ritchie	NWS	4	Sep 14, 1927	Tacoma Bowl, Dayton, Ohio, U.S.	
16	Win	8–2 (6)	Boston Ponzi	NWS	4	Sep 5, 1927	Tacoma Bowl, Dayton, Ohio, U.S.	
15	Win	8–2 (5)	Bulldog Fisher	KO	1 (6)	Sep 2, 1927	Armco Field, Middletown, Ohio, U.S.	
14	Win	7–2 (5)	Kid Oder	PTS	4	Aug 17, 1927	Armco Field, Middletown, Ohio, U.S.	
13	Win	6–2 (5)	Kid Oder	NWS	6	Aug 11, 1927	Outdoor Arena, Fort Thomas, Kentucky, U.S.	
12	Win	6–2 (4)	Freddy Schroeder	NWS	6	Jul 28, 1927	Outdoor Arena, Fort Thomas, Kentucky, U.S.	
11	Win	6–2 (3)	Kid Casey	KO	1 (4)	Jul 14, 1927	Outdoor Arena, Fort Thomas, Kentucky, U.S.	
10	Win	5–2 (3)	Kid Ritchie	NWS	6	Jul 7, 1927	Outdoor Arena, Fort Thomas, Kentucky, U.S.	
9	Win	5–2 (2)	King Cole	KO	3 (4)	Jun 30, 1927	Outdoor Arena, Fort Thomas, Kentucky, U.S.	
8	Win	4–2 (2)	Mike Prunty	NWS	4	Jun 16, 1927	Outdoor Arena, Fort Thomas, Kentucky, U.S.	
7	Win	4–2 (1)	Chester Brown	KO	1 (4)	Jun 4, 1927	New Vine Street Arena, Cincinnati, Ohio, U.S.	
6	Win	3–2 (1)	Chester Brown	KO	4 (4)	May 26, 1927	Outdoor Arena, Kentucky, U.S.	
5	Draw	2–2 (1)	Kid Mex	NWS	4	May 19, 1927	Soldiers Arena, Fort Thomas, Kentucky, U.S.	
4	Loss	2–2	Kid Hickman	PTS	4	May 2, 1927	Baesman Hall, Portsmouth, Ohio, U.S.	
3	Win	2–1	Chester Brown	PTS	4	Apr 30, 1927	Memorial Hall, Dayton, Ohio, U.S.	
2	Win	1–1	Billy Barnes	KO	2 (4)	Apr 23, 1927	Memorial Hall, Dayton, Ohio, U.S.	
1	Loss	0–1	Mutt Snyder	TKO	3 (8)	Apr 6, 1927	Memorial Hall, Dayton, Ohio, U.S.	

=== Unofficial record ===
251 fights	211 wins	30 losses
By knockout	45	2
By decision	163	26
By disqualification	3	2
Draws	7	
No contests	3	

Record with the inclusion of newspaper decisions in the win/loss/draw column.

No.	Result	Record	Opponent	Type	Round	Date	Location	Notes
251	Loss	211–30–7 (3)	Herschel Joiner	TKO	8 (10)	Apr 1, 1940	Music Hall Arena, Cincinnati, Ohio, U.S.	
250	Loss	211–29–7 (3)	Georgie Hansford	PTS	10	Dec 1, 1939	Legion Stadium, Hollywood, California, U.S.	
249	Loss	211–28–7 (3)	Simon Chavez	PTS	10	Sep 10, 1939	Caracas, Venezuela	
248	Win	211–27–7 (3)	Baby Oriental	KO	2 (10)	May 7, 1939	Caracas, Venezuela	
247	Win	210–27–7 (3)	Enrique Chaffardet	PTS	10	Apr 23, 1939	Caracas, Venezuela	
246	Loss	209–27–7 (3)	Simon Chavez	PTS	10	Apr 9, 1939	Caracas, Venezuela	
245	Win	209–26–7 (3)	Wishy Jones	UD	10	Feb 6, 1939	Columbia Gymnasium Arena, Louisville, Kentucky, U.S.	
244	Loss	208–26–7 (3)	Emil Joseph	UD	10	Jan 23, 1939	Motor Square Garden, Pittsburgh, Pennsylvania, U.S.	
243	Loss	208–25–7 (3)	Jackie Callura	UD	10	Jan 3, 1939	Convention Hall, Rochester, New York, U.S.	
242	Loss	208–24–7 (3)	Sammy Angott	UD	10	Dec 5, 1938	Columbia Gymnasium Arena, Louisville, Kentucky, U.S.	
241	Loss	208–23–7 (3)	Leo Rodak	PTS	15	Oct 24, 1938	Turner's Arena, Washington, D.C., U.S.	For Maryland State featherweight title
240	Win	208–22–7 (3)	Johnny King	PTS	10	Sep 1, 1938	The Stadium, Liverpool, Merseyside, England, U.K.	
239	Win	207–22–7 (3)	Jack Carrick	PTS	10	Jul 21, 1938	The Stadium, Liverpool, Merseyside, England, U.K.	
238	Win	206–22–7 (3)	Ronnie James	DQ	8 (12)	Jun 27, 1938	Vetch Field, Swansea, Wales, U.K.	
237	Win	205–22–7 (3)	Billy Charlton	PTS	12	Jun 13, 1938	White City Stadium, Newcastle, Tyne and Wear, England, U.K.	
236	Win	204–22–7 (3)	Frank McCudden	PTS	12	May 26, 1938	Waverley Market, Edinburgh, Scotland, U.K.	
235	Win	203–22–7 (3)	Len Beynon	PTS	12	May 12, 1938	Vetch Field, Swansea, Wales, U.K.	
234	Win	202–22–7 (3)	Johnny Cusick	KO	7 (12)	Apr 28, 1938	The Stadium, Liverpool, Merseyside, England, U.K.	
233	Win	201–22–7 (3)	Tommy Tune	TKO	5 (12)	Apr 12, 1938	Villa Marina Ballroom, Douglas, Isle Of Man, U.K.	
232	Win	200–22–7 (3)	Tommy Hyams	KO	9 (10)	Mar 28, 1938	Colston Hall, Bristol, Avon, England, U.K.	
231	Draw	199–22–7 (3)	Paul Dogniaux	PTS	8	Mar 17, 1938	Salle Wagram, Paris, Paris, France	
230	Win	199–22–6 (3)	Billy Charlton	PTS	12	Mar 10, 1938	The Stadium, Liverpool, Merseyside, England, U.K.	
229	Win	198–22–6 (3)	Len Wickwar	PTS	12	Feb 21, 1938	Granby Halls, Leicester, Leicestershire, England, U.K.	
228	Win	197–22–6 (3)	Billy Charlton	PTS	12	Jan 27, 1938	The Stadium, Liverpool, Merseyside, England, U.K.	
227	Win	196–22–6 (3)	Aldo Spoldi	PTS	12	Nov 13, 1937	Wanderers Stadium,, Johannesburg, South Africa	
226	Win	195–22–6 (3)	Len Tiger Smith	PTS	10	Oct 16, 1937	City Hall, Johannesburg, South Africa	
225	Loss	194–22–6 (3)	Petey Sarron	PTS	12	Sep 4, 1937	Wanderers Stadium, Johannesburg, South Africa	For NBA and The Ring featherweight titles
224	Win	194–21–6 (3)	Petey Sarron	PTS	10	Jul 31, 1937	Wanderers Stadium, Johannesburg, South Africa	
223	ND	193–21–6 (3)	Alec Hannan	ND	8	Jul 17, 1937	Praça de Touros Monumental, Maputo, Mozambique	Date uncertain
222	Win	193–21–6 (2)	Freddie 'Red' Cochrane	PTS	8	Jun 7, 1937	Dexter Park Arena, Woodhaven, New York City, New York, U.S.	
221	Win	192–21–6 (2)	Maxie Fisher	PTS	8	May 17, 1937	Dexter Park Arena, Woodhaven, New York City, New York, U.S.	
220	Loss	191–21–6 (2)	Jackie Wilson	SD	10	Apr 26, 1937	Music Hall Arena, Cincinnati, Ohio, U.S.	
219	Win	191–20–6 (2)	Dominic Mancini	PTS	10	Apr 12, 1937	Columbia Gymnasium Arena, Louisville, Kentucky, U.S.	
218	Draw	190–20–6 (2)	Lew Feldman	PTS	8	Apr 6, 1937	New York Coliseum, New York City, New York, U.S.	
217	Loss	190–20–5 (2)	Norment Quarles	SD	10	Mar 22, 1937	Music Hall Arena, Cincinnati, Ohio, U.S.	
216	Loss	190–19–5 (2)	Jackie Wilson	MD	10	Feb 9, 1937	Motor Square Garden, Pittsburgh, Pennsylvania, U.S.	
215	Win	190–18–5 (2)	Joey Temmes	PTS	10	Feb 1, 1937	Turner's Arena, Washington, D.C., U.S.	
214	Win	189–18–5 (2)	Dave Finn	TKO	5 (10)	Jan 18, 1937	Columbia Gymnasium Arena, Louisville, Kentucky, U.S.	
213	Win	188–18–5 (2)	Jimmy Vaughn	PTS	10	Jan 11, 1937	Columbia Gymnasium Arena, Louisville, Kentucky, U.S.	
212	Win	187–18–5 (2)	Frankie Covelli	SD	10	Jan 6, 1937	Ohio National Guard Armory, Cincinnati, Ohio, U.S.	
211	Win	186–18–5 (2)	Phil Zwick	TKO	4 (10)	Nov 28, 1936	Wanderers Stadium, Johannesburg, South Africa	
210	Win	185–18–5 (2)	Willie Smith	KO	6 (12)	Nov 21, 1936	City Hall, Durban, KwaZulu-Natal, South Africa	
209	Win	184–18–5 (2)	Maurice Holtzer	PTS	12	Oct 24, 1936	Wembley Stadium, Johannesburg, Gauteng, South Africa	
208	Win	183–18–5 (2)	Willie Smith	KO	6 (12)	Oct 10, 1936	Wembley Stadium, Johannesburg, Gauteng, South Africa	
207	Win	182–18–5 (2)	Jimmy Buckler	UD	10	Jul 13, 1936	Swiss Park Open Air Arena, Louisville, Kentucky, U.S.	
206	Win	181–18–5 (2)	Everette Rightmire	UD	10	Jun 24, 1936	Municipal Auditorium, Kansas City, Missouri, U.S.	
205	Loss	180–18–5 (2)	Jimmy Vaughn	SD	10	May 27, 1936	Parkway Arena, Cincinnati, Ohio, U.S.	
204	Loss	180–17–5 (2)	Petey Sarron	MD	15	May 11, 1936	Griffith Stadium, Washington, D.C., U.S.	Lost NBA and The Ring featherweight titles
203	Win	180–16–5 (2)	Andy Martin	NWS	10	Mar 20, 1936	City Auditorium, Birmingham, Alabama, U.S.	
202	Win	179–16–5 (2)	Fillo Echevarria	PTS	10	Mar 14, 1936	Arena Cristal, Havana, Cuba	
201	Win	178–16–5 (2)	Petey Sarron	PTS	15	Mar 2, 1936	Coliseum, Coral Gables, Florida, U.S.	Retained NBA and The Ring featherweight titles
200	Win	177–16–5 (2)	Johnny Pena	UD	12	Feb 18, 1936	Crystal Pool, Seattle, Washington, U.S.	Retained NBA and The Ring featherweight titles
199	Win	176–16–5 (2)	Bobby Gray	KO	1 (10)	Feb 11, 1936	San Jose, California, U.S.	
198	Win	175–16–5 (2)	Cecil Payne	MD	10	Jan 28, 1936	Crystal Pool, Seattle, Washington, U.S.	
197	Loss	174–16–5 (2)	Johnny Pena	PTS	10	Jan 15, 1936	Auditorium, Oakland, California, U.S.	
196	Loss	174–15–5 (2)	Rodolfo Casanova	UD	10	Jan 1, 1936	El Toreo de Cuatro Caminos, Mexico City, Distrito Federal, Mexico	
195	Win	174–14–5 (2)	Claude Varner	UD	10	Dec 11, 1935	Music Hall Arena, Cincinnati, Ohio, U.S.	
194	Win	173–14–5 (2)	Jimmy Christy	PTS	10	Nov 29, 1935	Chicago Stadium, Chicago, Illinois, U.S.	
193	Loss	172–14–5 (2)	Norment Quarles	SD	10	Nov 18, 1935	Northside Arena, Pittsburgh, Pennsylvania, U.S.	
192	Win	172–13–5 (2)	Roger Bernard	PTS	10	Nov 13, 1935	Maple Leaf Gardens, Toronto, Ontario, Canada	
191	Win	171–13–5 (2)	Claude Varner	PTS	10	Nov 6, 1935	Music Hall Arena, Cincinnati, Ohio, U.S.	
190	Win	170–13–5 (2)	Vernon Cormier	UD	15	Oct 22, 1935	Boston Garden, Boston, Massachusetts, U.S.	Retained NBA and The Ring featherweight titles
189	Win	169–13–5 (2)	Paul "Tennessee" Lee	PTS	10	Oct 11, 1935	Armory, Indianapolis, Indiana, U.S.	
188	Win	168–13–5 (2)	Willie Davies	PTS	10	Sep 20, 1935	Patterson Blvd. Arena, Dayton, Ohio, U.S.	
187	Win	167–13–5 (2)	Cecil Payne	UD	10	Sep 16, 1935	Jefferson County Armory, Louisville, Kentucky, U.S.	
186	Win	166–13–5 (2)	Eddie Zivic	PTS	10	Sep 9, 1935	Duquesne Garden, Pittsburgh, Pennsylvania, U.S.	
185	Win	165–13–5 (2)	Al Hamilton	PTS	10	Aug 28, 1935	Parkway Arena, Cincinnati, Ohio, U.S.	
184	Win	164–13–5 (2)	Roger Bernard	UD	10	Aug 20, 1935	Northside Ballpark, Cincinnati, Ohio, U.S.	
183	Win	163–13–5 (2)	Seaman Tommy Watson	KO	2 (10)	Jul 25, 1935	Anfield Football Ground, Liverpool, Merseyside, England, U.K.	
182	Win	162–13–5 (2)	Stan Jehu	RTD	4 (10)	Jul 12, 1935	Dalymount Park, Dublin, Ireland	
181	Win	161–13–5 (2)	Seaman Tommy Watson	PTS	10	Jun 27, 1935	Anfield Football Ground, Liverpool, Merseyside, England, U.K.	
180	Win	160–13–5 (2)	Nel Tarleton	PTS	15	Jun 12, 1935	Stanley Greyhound Track, Liverpool, Merseyside, England, U.K.	Retained NBA and The Ring featherweight titles
179	Win	159–13–5 (2)	Jimmy Walsh	PTS	10	May 23, 1935	The Stadium, Liverpool, Merseyside, England, U.K.	
178	Win	158–13–5 (2)	Johnny Cruz	KO	7 (10)	Apr 21, 1935	Plaza de Toros del Coliseo Balear, Palma de Mallorca, Islas Baleares, Spain	
177	Win	157–13–5 (2)	Jimmy Stewart	PTS	10	Apr 11, 1935	The Stadium, Liverpool, Merseyside, England, U.K.	
176	Win	156–13–5 (2)	Jose Mico	KO	3 (10)	Apr 3, 1935	Teatro Circo Price, Madrid, Comunidad de Madrid, Spain	
175	Win	155–13–5 (2)	Luigi Quadrini	PTS	10	Mar 27, 1935	Teatro Circo Olympia, Barcelona, Cataluña, Spain	
174	Win	154–13–5 (2)	Harry Brooks	KO	7 (10)	Mar 24, 1935	The Ring, Blackfriars Road, Southwark, London, England, U.K.	
173	Win	153–13–5 (2)	Javier Torres	RTD	6 (10)	Mar 14, 1935	Teatro Circo Olympia, Barcelona, Cataluña, Spain	
172	Win	152–13–5 (2)	Johnny Edwards	PTS	10	Mar 11, 1935	Palais des Sports, Paris, Paris, France	
171	Win	151–13–5 (2)	Stan Jehu	PTS	10	Mar 3, 1935	Pavilion Theatre Arena, Whitechapel, London, England, U.K.	
170	Win	150–13–5 (2)	Johnny Peters	TKO	4 (12)	Feb 28, 1935	The Stadium, Liverpool, Merseyside, England, U.K.	
169	Win	149–13–5 (2)	Douglas Kestrell	PTS	8	Feb 26, 1935	Ulster Hall, Belfast, Northern Ireland, U.K.	
168	Win	148–13–5 (2)	Benny Caplan	PTS	10	Feb 24, 1935	The Ring, Blackfriars Road, Southwark, London, England, U.K.	
167	Win	147–13–5 (2)	José Girones	KO	1 (15)	Feb 17, 1935	Palais des Sports, Paris, Paris, France	Retained NBA and The Ring featherweight titles
166	Loss	146–13–5 (2)	Maurice Holtzer	PTS	10	Feb 11, 1935	Palais des Sports, Paris, Paris, France	
165	Win	146–12–5 (2)	Frans Machtens	UD	10	Jan 26, 1935	Palais des Sports, Schaerbeek, Bruxelles-Capitale, Belgium	
164	Draw	145–12–5 (2)	Benny Caplan	PTS	10	Jan 20, 1935	The Ring, Blackfriars Road, Southwark, London, England, U.K.	
163	Win	145–12–4 (2)	Tommy Rogers	PTS	12	Jan 14, 1935	Embassy Rink, Sparbrook, West Midlands, England, U.K.	
162	Win	144–12–4 (2)	Joe Young Connelly	PTS	10	Jan 6, 1935	The Ring, Blackfriars Road, Southwark, London, England, U.K.	
161	Win	143–12–4 (2)	Francis Augier	KO	7 (10)	Jan 4, 1935	Salle Wagram, Paris, Paris, France	
160	Win	142–12–4 (2)	Panama Al Brown	UD	10	Dec 24, 1934	Palais des Sports, Paris, Paris, France	
159	Win	141–12–4 (2)	Cuthbert Taylor	PTS	12	Dec 6, 1934	The Stadium, Liverpool, England, U.K.	
158	Win	140–12–4 (2)	Jose Girones	DQ	5 (10)	Dec 1, 1934	Teatro Circo Olympia, Barcelona, Cataluña, Spain	Girones was disqualified for hitting low
157	Win	139–12–4 (2)	Johnny Cuthbert	KO	2 (12)	Nov 22, 1934	The Stadium, Liverpool, England, U.K.	
156	Win	138–12–4 (2)	Gilbert Johnstone	DQ	10 (10)	Oct 25, 1934	Adelphi SC, Glasgow, Scotland, U.K.	
155	ND	137–12–4 (2)	Cuthbert Taylor	ND	6	Oct 20, 1934	Workingmens' Institute, Llanelli, Wales, U.K.	
154	Win	137–12–4 (1)	Jimmy Walsh	PTS	12	Oct 18, 1934	The Stadium, Liverpool, England, U.K.	
153	Loss	136–12–4 (1)	Willie Gannon	DQ	6 (10)	Oct 8, 1934	King's Hall, Belle Vue, Manchester, Lancashire, England, U.K.	Miller dropped Gannon with a left to the body in the first round but was later disqualified for a low blow
152	Win	136–11–4 (1)	Benny Sharkey	KO	1 (12)	Oct 8, 1934	Newcastle, Tyne and Wear, England, U.K.	
151	Win	135–11–4 (1)	Dave Crowley	PTS	10	Oct 1, 1934	Royal Albert Hall, Kensington, London, England, U.K.	
150	Win	134–11–4 (1)	Billy Hazel	KO	5 (10)	Sep 24, 1934	Anfield Football Ground, Liverpool, Merseyside, England, U.K.	
149	Win	133–11–4 (1)	Nel Tarleton	PTS	15	Sep 20, 1934	Anfield Football Ground, Liverpool, Merseyside, England, U.K.	Retained NBA and The Ring featherweight titles
148	Win	132–11–4 (1)	Little Dempsey	PTS	10	Aug 10, 1934	Salinas A.C., Salinas, California, U.S.	
147	Win	131–11–4 (1)	Tommy Paul	PTS	10	Aug 3, 1934	Legion Stadium, Hollywood, California, U.S.	
146	Win	130–11–4 (1)	Clever Sison	PTS	10	Jul 20, 1934	Pismo Beach Arena, Pismo Beach, California, U.S.	
145	Win	129–11–4 (1)	Gene Espinosa	KO	8 (10)	Jul 13, 1934	Civic Auditorium, Watsonville, California, U.S.	Retained NBA and The Ring featherweight titles
144	Win	128–11–4 (1)	Georgie Hansford	PTS	10	Jun 29, 1934	Legion Stadium, Hollywood, California, U.S.	
143	Loss	127–11–4 (1)	Tommy Paul	DQ	2 (10)	Jun 19, 1934	Olympic Auditorium, Los Angeles, California, U.S.	Miller was disqualified for a low-blow that dislocated Paul's hip
142	Win	127–10–4 (1)	Chalky Wright	PTS	8	Jun 8, 1934	El Centro A.C., El Centro, California, U.S.	
141	Win	126–10–4 (1)	Rodolfo Casanova	PTS	10	May 29, 1934	Olympic Auditorium, Los Angeles, California, U.S.	
140	Win	125–10–4 (1)	Paul Dazzo	KO	6 (15)	May 4, 1934	Jefferson County Armory, Louisville, Kentucky, U.S.	Retained NBA and The Ring featherweight titles
139	Win	124–10–4 (1)	Jackie Sharkey	UD	10	Apr 13, 1934	Auditorium, Minneapolis, Minnesota, U.S.	
138	Win	123–10–4 (1)	Moon Mullins	PTS	10	Apr 3, 1934	Coliseum, Vincennes, Indiana, U.S.	
137	Win	122–10–4 (1)	Mose Butch	UD	10	Mar 19, 1934	Motor Square Garden, Pittsburgh, Pennsylvania, U.S.	
136	Win	121–10–4 (1)	Petey Sarron	PTS	10	Feb 7, 1934	Music Hall Arena, Cincinnati, Ohio, U.S.	
135	Win	120–10–4 (1)	Frankie Covelli	PTS	10	Jan 31, 1934	Broadway Arena, New York City, New York, U.S.	
134	Win	119–10–4 (1)	Roger Bernard	PTS	10	Jan 15, 1934	Flint, Michigan, U.S.	
133	Win	118–10–4 (1)	Jackie Sharkey	UD	10	Jan 1, 1934	Music Hall Arena, Cincinnati, Ohio, U.S.	Retained NBA and The Ring featherweight titles
132	Win	117–10–4 (1)	Sammy Levine	PTS	10	Dec 20, 1933	Arcadia Gardens, Chicago, Illinois, U.S.	
131	Win	116–10–4 (1)	Paul Dazzo	PTS	10	Dec 6, 1933	Arcadia Gardens, Chicago, Illinois, U.S.	
130	Win	115–10–4 (1)	Lew Feldman	UD	10	Nov 14, 1933	Ridgewood Grove, New York City, New York, U.S.	
129	Win	114–10–4 (1)	Petey Sarron	UD	10	Nov 1, 1933	Portner's Arena, Alexandria, Virginia, U.S.	
128	Win	113–10–4 (1)	Jackie Sharkey	PTS	10	Oct 23, 1933	Auditorium, Milwaukee, Wisconsin, U.S.	
127	Loss	112–10–4 (1)	Frankie Wallace	SD	10	Sep 26, 1933	Coliseum, Cleveland, Ohio, U.S.	
126	Win	112–9–4 (1)	Lew Feldman	PTS	10	Sep 1, 1933	Parkway Arena, Cincinnati, Ohio, U.S.	
125	Win	111–9–4 (1)	Abie Israel	KO	4 (15)	Jul 11, 1933	Civic Ice Arena, Seattle, Washington, U.S.	Retained NBA featherweight title
124	Loss	110–9–4 (1)	Baby Arizmendi	PTS	10	Jun 12, 1933	Exposition Auditorium, San Francisco, California, U.S.	
123	Win	110–8–4 (1)	Joe Guerrero	PTS	6	May 24, 1933	Pico Arena, Pico, California, U.S.	
122	Win	109–8–4 (1)	Eddie Trujillo	PTS	10	May 12, 1933	Legion Stadium, Hollywood, California, U.S.	
121	Win	108–8–4 (1)	Johnny Gonzales	KO	4 (10)	Apr 26, 1933	Wilmington Bowl, Wilmington, California, U.S.	
120	Loss	107–8–4 (1)	Abie Israel	PTS	6	Apr 18, 1933	Civic Ice Arena, Seattle, Washington, U.S.	
119	Win	107–7–4 (1)	Andy Bundy	PTS	10	Apr 11, 1933	Auditorium, Portland, Oregon, U.S.	
118	Win	106–7–4 (1)	Cecil Payne	PTS	10	Apr 4, 1933	Olympic Auditorium, Los Angeles, California, U.S.	
117	Win	105–7–4 (1)	Speedy Dado	PTS	10	Mar 21, 1933	Olympic Auditorium, Los Angeles, California, U.S.	Retained NBA featherweight title
116	Win	104–7–4 (1)	Little Dempsey	PTS	10	Mar 9, 1933	Memorial Auditorium, Sacramento, California, U.S.	
115	Win	103–7–4 (1)	Baby Arizmendi	PTS	10	Feb 28, 1933	Olympic Auditorium, Los Angeles, California, U.S.	Retained NBA featherweight title; Won California State featherweight title
114	Win	102–7–4 (1)	Tommy Paul	SD	10	Jan 13, 1933	Chicago Stadium, Chicago, Illinois, U.S.	Won NBA featherweight title
113	Win	101–7–4 (1)	Jackie Sharkey	PTS	10	Dec 29, 1932	Chicago Stadium, Chicago, Illinois, U.S.	
112	Draw	100–7–4 (1)	Frankie Wallace	PTS	10	Aug 31, 1932	Parkway Arena, Cincinnati, Ohio, U.S.	For vacant USA Ohio State featherweight title
111	Win	100–7–3 (1)	Hymie Wiseman	PTS	8	Aug 4, 1932	Chicago Stadium, Chicago, Illinois, U.S.	
110	Win	99–7–3 (1)	Nat Suess	TKO	6 (?)	Jun 29, 1932	Coney Island Stadium, New York City, New York, U.S.	
109	Win	98–7–3 (1)	Frankie Wallace	UD	10	Jun 22, 1932	Parkway Arena, Cincinnati, Ohio, U.S.	
108	Win	97–7–3 (1)	Johnny Dunn	PTS	8	May 13, 1932	Olympia Stadium, Detroit, Michigan, U.S.	
107	Win	96–7–3 (1)	Ray Meyers	PTS	10	May 2, 1932	St. Nicholas Arena, New York City, New York, U.S.	
106	Loss	95–7–3 (1)	Frankie Wallace	PTS	10	Apr 8, 1932	Olympia Stadium, Detroit, Michigan, U.S.	
105	Win	95–6–3 (1)	Johnny Kaiser	PTS	10	Mar 22, 1932	Coliseum, Saint Louis, Missouri, U.S.	
104	Win	94–6–3 (1)	Johnny Datto	PTS	10	Feb 24, 1932	Coliseum, Saint Louis, Missouri, U.S.	
103	Win	93–6–3 (1)	Miki Gelb	PTS	10	Feb 19, 1932	Olympia Stadium, Detroit, Michigan, U.S.	
102	Win	92–6–3 (1)	Joe Ghnouly	UD	10	Feb 9, 1932	Coliseum, Saint Louis, Missouri, U.S.	
101	NC	91–6–3 (1)	Battling Battalino	NC	3 (10)	Jan 27, 1932	Music Hall Arena, Cincinnati, Ohio, U.S.	NBA and The Ring featherweight titles at stake; Battalino missed weight and was down in the third from a blow deemed to be too light by the ref and was deemed to be faking.
100	Win	91–6–3	Johnny Datto	PTS	10	Jan 13, 1932	Music Hall Arena, Cincinnati, Ohio, U.S.	
99	Win	90–6–3	Ray Meyers	PTS	8	Dec 21, 1931	New Lenox S.C., New York City, New York, U.S.	
98	Win	89–6–3	Lew Feldman	SD	8	Dec 11, 1931	Madison Square Garden, New York City, New York, U.S.	
97	Win	88–6–3	Billy Shaw	SD	10	Nov 30, 1931	Armory, Sidney, Ohio, U.S.	
96	Loss	87–6–3	Tommy Paul	UD	10	Aug 31, 1931	Broadway Auditorium, Buffalo, New York, U.S.	
95	Win	87–5–3	Emil Paluso	UD	10	Aug 24, 1931	Redland Field, Cincinnati, Ohio, U.S.	
94	Loss	86–5–3	Battling Battalino	UD	10	Jul 23, 1931	Redland Field, Cincinnati, Ohio, U.S.	For NYSAC, NBA, and The Ring featherweight titles
93	Win	86–4–3	Eddie Shea	UD	10	Jun 11, 1931	Redland Field, Cincinnati, Ohio, U.S.	
92	Win	85–4–3	Billy Shaw	PTS	10	Jun 1, 1931	Ye Towne Hall, Portsmouth, Ohio, U.S.	
91	Win	84–4–3	Tommy Paul	PTS	10	Apr 13, 1931	Music Hall Arena, Cincinnati, Ohio, U.S.	
90	Win	83–4–3	Manuel Castro	PTS	10	Mar 30, 1931	Memorial Hall, Dayton, Ohio, U.S.	
89	Win	82–4–3	Johnny Farr	PTS	10	Mar 26, 1931	Music Hall Arena, Cincinnati, Ohio, U.S.	
88	Win	81–4–3	Tommy Paul	PTS	10	Mar 5, 1931	Music Hall Arena, Cincinnati, Ohio, U.S.	
87	Win	80–4–3	Phil Zwick	KO	3 (10)	Jan 26, 1931	Wheeling, West Virginia, U.S.	
86	Win	79–4–3	Roger Bernard	UD	10	Jan 1, 1931	Music Hall Arena, Cincinnati, Ohio, U.S.	
85	Win	78–4–3	Babe Ruth	KO	2 (10)	Dec 8, 1930	Jefferson County Armory, Louisville, Kentucky, U.S.	
84	Loss	77–4–3	Johnny Farr	PTS	10	Nov 13, 1930	Music Hall Arena, Cincinnati, Ohio, U.S.	
83	Win	77–3–3	Babe Ruth	NWS	10	Oct 27, 1930	Wheeling, Ohio, U.S.	
82	Win	76–3–3	Johnny Farr	UD	10	Oct 2, 1930	Ohio National Guard Armory, Cincinnati, Ohio, U.S.	
81	Win	75–3–3	Cecil Payne	PTS	10	Sep 16, 1930	Redland Field, Cincinnati, Ohio, U.S.	
80	Win	74–3–3	Babe Ruth	PTS	10	Sep 4, 1930	Haft's Acre, Columbus, Ohio, U.S.	
79	Win	73–3–3	Joe Marciente	UD	10	Aug 21, 1930	Redland Field, Cincinnati, Ohio, U.S.	
78	Win	72–3–3	Henry Falegano	PTS	10	Jul 31, 1930	Redland Field, Cincinnati, Ohio, U.S.	
77	Draw	71–3–3	Bushy Graham	PTS	10	Jan 29, 1930	Music Hall Arena, Cincinnati, Ohio, U.S.	
76	Win	71–3–2	Willy Michel	KO	4 (10)	Jan 1, 1930	Music Hall Arena, Cincinnati, Ohio, U.S.	
75	Win	70–3–2	Steve Smith	UD	10	Dec 11, 1929	Music Hall Arena, Cincinnati, Ohio, U.S.	
74	Win	69–3–2	Steve Smith	UD	10	Nov 6, 1929	Music Hall Arena, Cincinnati, Ohio, U.S.	
73	Win	68–3–2	Al Crisp	UD	10	Oct 9, 1929	Music Hall Arena, Cincinnati, Ohio, U.S.	
72	Win	67–3–2	Midget Mike O'Dowd	UD	10	Sep 9, 1929	Redland Field, Cincinnati, Ohio, U.S.	Retained USA Ohio State lightweight title
71	Win	66–3–2	Midget Mike O'Dowd	UD	10	Aug 27, 1929	Redland Field, Cincinnati, Ohio, U.S.	Retained USA Ohio State lightweight title
70	Win	65–3–2	Harry Forbes	UD	10	Aug 6, 1929	Redland Field, Cincinnati, Ohio, U.S.	Retained Greater Cincinnati lightweight title
69	Win	64–3–2	Babe Kellar	PTS	10	Jul 2, 1929	Redland Field, Cincinnati, Ohio, U.S.	
68	Win	63–3–2	Eddie O'Dowd	UD	10	Jun 11, 1929	Redland Field, Cincinnati, Ohio, U.S.	
67	Win	62–3–2	Babe Kellar	UD	10	May 6, 1929	Ohio National Guard Armory, Cincinnati, Ohio, U.S.	Won USA Ohio State featherweight title
66	Win	61–3–2	Babe Ruth	UD	10	Apr 17, 1929	Music Hall Arena, Cincinnati, Ohio, U.S.	
65	Win	60–3–2	Johnny Brown	PTS	10	Mar 27, 1929	Music Hall Arena, Cincinnati, Ohio, U.S.	Retained Greater Cincinnati lightweight title
64	Win	59–3–2	Harry McCarthy	KO	7 (10)	Mar 7, 1929	Music Hall Arena, Cincinnati, Ohio, U.S.	Retained Greater Cincinnati lightweight title
63	Win	58–3–2	Joe Paglina	UD	8	Feb 6, 1929	Music Hall Arena, Cincinnati, Ohio, U.S.	
62	Win	57–3–2	Johnny Brown	PTS	10	Jan 23, 1929	Music Hall Arena, Cincinnati, Ohio, U.S.	Retained Greater Cincinnati lightweight title
61	Win	56–3–2	Cecil Payne	PTS	10	Jan 1, 1929	Music Hall Arena, Cincinnati, Ohio, U.S.	Retained Greater Cincinnati lightweight title
60	Win	55–3–2	Stanley Williams	PTS	6	Dec 22, 1928	Ohio National Guard Armory, Cincinnati, Ohio, U.S.	
59	Win	54–3–2	Jess McMurtry	KO	2 (10)	Dec 10, 1928	Armory, Marietta, Ohio, U.S.	
58	Win	53–3–2	Cecil Payne	NWS	6	Dec 1, 1928	Ohio National Guard Armory, Cincinnati, Ohio, U.S.	
57	Win	52–3–2	King Cole	KO	4 (?)	Nov 11, 1928	Middletown, Ohio, U.S.	
56	Win	51–3–2	Babe Peleco	PTS	10	Oct 29, 1928	Baesman Hall, Portsmouth, Ohio, U.S.	
55	Win	50–3–2	Eddie Morgan	NWS	8	Oct 22, 1928	Tacoma Skating Rink, Dayton, Ohio, U.S.	
54	Win	49–3–2	Andy Stahura	NWS	10	Oct 16, 1928	Soldiers Arena, Fort Thomas, Kentucky, U.S.	
53	Win	48–3–2	Ray Kirkpatrick	KO	5 (6)	Oct 9, 1928	Soldiers Arena, Fort Thomas, Kentucky, U.S.	
52	Win	47–3–2	Phil O'Dowd	NWS	10	Oct 2, 1928	Soldiers Arena, Fort Thomas, Kentucky, U.S.	
51	Win	46–3–2	Jimmy Harris	PTS	10	Sep 17, 1928	Redland Field, Cincinnati, Ohio, U.S.	Retained Greater Cincinnati lightweight title
50	Win	45–3–2	Al Dundee	PTS	10	Aug 27, 1928	Baesman Hall, Portsmouth, Ohio, U.S.	
49	Win	44–3–2	Jimmy Harris	PTS	6	Aug 20, 1928	Redland Field, Cincinnati, Ohio, U.S.	Retained Cincinnati City lightweight title
48	Win	43–3–2	Eddie Klusman	PTS	10	Aug 8, 1928	Middletown, Ohio, U.S.	Exact date unknown
47	Win	42–3–2	Windy Meyers	PTS	6	Jul 23, 1928	Redland Field, Cincinnati, Ohio, U.S.	
46	Win	41–3–2	Buddy Bezenah	NWS	6	Jun 27, 1928	Tacoma Bowl, Dayton, Ohio, U.S.	
45	Win	40–3–2	Jimmy Harris	NWS	10	Jun 14, 1928	Outdoor Arena, Fort Thomas, Kentucky, U.S.	Greater Cincinnati featherweight title
44	Win	39–3–2	Eddie Klusman	PTS	6	Jun 6, 1928	Middletown, Ohio, U.S.	
43	Win	38–3–2	Kid Hickman	KO	3 (6)	May 25, 1928	Armory, Washington Court House, Ohio, U.S.	
42	Win	37–3–2	King Cole	TKO	3 (8)	May 10, 1928	Armory, Washington Court House, Ohio, U.S.	
41	Win	36–3–2	Louis D'Arco	NWS	6	May 5, 1928	Ohio National Guard Armory, Cincinnati, Ohio, U.S.	
40	Win	35–3–2	Howard Jones	NWS	6	Apr 26, 1928	Soldiers Arena, Fort Thomas, Kentucky, U.S.	
39	Win	34–3–2	Young Fisher	KO	2 (8)	Apr 20, 1928	Armory, Washington Court House, Ohio, U.S.	
38	Win	33–3–2	Red Wise	NWS	6	Apr 5, 1928	Soldiers Arena, Fort Thomas, Kentucky, U.S.	
37	Draw	32–3–2	Chet Smallwood	NWS	6	Mar 31, 1928	Ohio National Guard Armory, Cincinnati, Ohio, U.S.	
36	Win	32–3–1	Jimmy Sanzone	NWS	10	Mar 22, 1928	Soldiers Arena, Fort Thomas, Kentucky, U.S.	
35	Win	31–3–1	Lon Lovelace	PTS	6	Mar 10, 1928	Ohio National Guard Armory, Cincinnati, Ohio, U.S.	
34	Win	30–3–1	Eddie Jackson	KO	5 (?)	Mar 3, 1928	Middletown, Ohio, U.S.	Date uncertain
33	Win	29–3–1	Ray Van Hook	PTS	6	Feb 25, 1928	Ohio National Guard Armory, Cincinnati, Ohio, U.S.	
32	Win	28–3–1	Buddy Bezenah	PTS	6	Feb 11, 1928	Ohio National Guard Armory, Cincinnati, Ohio, U.S.	
31	Win	27–3–1	Red Wise	PTS	8	Feb 2, 1928	Armory, Washington Court House, Ohio, U.S.	
30	Win	26–3–1	Kid Ritchie	NWS	6	Jan 26, 1928	Soldiers Arena, Fort Thomas, Kentucky, U.S.	
29	Win	25–3–1	Lightning Wells	KO	2 (?)	Jan 1, 1928	Middletown, Ohio, U.S.	Exact date unknown
28	Loss	24–3–1	Jimmy Harris	NWS	10	Dec 22, 1927	Soldiers Arena, Fort Thomas, Kentucky, U.S.	City of Cincinnati featherweight title
27	Win	24–2–1	Jimmy Harris	NWS	10	Dec 1, 1927	Soldiers Arena, Fort Thomas, Kentucky, U.S.	Won vacant Greater Cincinnati featherweight title
26	Win	23–2–1	Al Proctor	NWS	6	Nov 17, 1927	Armory, Hamilton, Ohio, U.S.	
25	Win	22–2–1	Eddie Klusman	PTS	4	Nov 11, 1927	Weller Theater, Zanesville, Ohio, U.S.	
24	Win	21–2–1	Buddy Bezenah	NWS	6	Nov 5, 1927	Ohio National Guard Armory, Cincinnati, Ohio, U.S.	
23	Win	20–2–1	Red Wise	NWS	6	Oct 26, 1927	Tacoma Skating Rink, Dayton, Ohio, U.S.	
22	Win	19–2–1	Howard Jones	NWS	6	Oct 22, 1927	Ohio National Guard Armory, Cincinnati, Ohio, U.S.	
21	Win	18–2–1	Jimmy Brown	NWS	8	Oct 20, 1927	Soldiers Arena, Fort Thomas, Kentucky, U.S.	
20	Win	17–2–1	Johnny Sauter	KO	3 (6)	Oct 12, 1927	Tacoma Skating Rink, Dayton, Ohio, U.S.	
19	Win	16–2–1	Al Proctor	NWS	6	Oct 6, 1927	Soldiers Arena, Fort Thomas, Kentucky, U.S.	
18	Win	15–2–1	Charley Court	NWS	8	Sep 22, 1927	Soldiers Arena, Fort Thomas, Kentucky, U.S.	
17	Win	14–2–1	Kid Ritchie	NWS	4	Sep 14, 1927	Tacoma Bowl, Dayton, Ohio, U.S.	
16	Win	13–2–1	Boston Ponzi	NWS	4	Sep 5, 1927	Tacoma Bowl, Dayton, Ohio, U.S.	
15	Win	12–2–1	Bulldog Fisher	KO	1 (6)	Sep 2, 1927	Armco Field, Middletown, Ohio, U.S.	
14	Win	11–2–1	Kid Oder	PTS	4	Aug 17, 1927	Armco Field, Middletown, Ohio, U.S.	
13	Win	10–2–1	Kid Oder	NWS	6	Aug 11, 1927	Outdoor Arena, Fort Thomas, Kentucky, U.S.	
12	Win	9–2–1	Freddy Schroeder	NWS	6	Jul 28, 1927	Outdoor Arena, Fort Thomas, Kentucky, U.S.	
11	Win	8–2–1	Kid Casey	KO	1 (4)	Jul 14, 1927	Outdoor Arena, Fort Thomas, Kentucky, U.S.	
10	Win	7–2–1	Kid Ritchie	NWS	6	Jul 7, 1927	Outdoor Arena, Fort Thomas, Kentucky, U.S.	
9	Win	6–2–1	King Cole	KO	3 (4)	Jun 30, 1927	Outdoor Arena, Fort Thomas, Kentucky, U.S.	
8	Win	5–2–1	Mike Prunty	NWS	4	Jun 16, 1927	Outdoor Arena, Fort Thomas, Kentucky, U.S.	
7	Win	4–2–1	Chester Brown	KO	1 (4)	Jun 4, 1927	New Vine Street Arena, Cincinnati, Ohio, U.S.	
6	Win	3–2–1	Chester Brown	KO	4 (4)	May 26, 1927	Outdoor Arena, Kentucky, U.S.	
5	Draw	2–2–1	Kid Mex	NWS	4	May 19, 1927	Soldiers Arena, Fort Thomas, Kentucky, U.S.	
4	Loss	2–2	Kid Hickman	PTS	4	May 2, 1927	Baesman Hall, Portsmouth, Ohio, U.S.	
3	Win	2–1	Chester Brown	PTS	4	Apr 30, 1927	Memorial Hall, Dayton, Ohio, U.S.	
2	Win	1–1	Billy Barnes	KO	2 (4)	Apr 23, 1927	Memorial Hall, Dayton, Ohio, U.S.	
1	Loss	0–1	Mutt Snyder	TKO	3 (8)	Apr 6, 1927	Memorial Hall, Dayton, Ohio, U.S.	

== See also ==
- List of left-handed boxers

Achievements
Preceded by Tommy Paul	NBA World Featherweight Champion; January 13, 1933 – May 11, 1936	Succeeded by Petey Sarron
