= Dave Crowley =

English boxer

Personal information
- Nationality: British
- Born: 4 May 1910 London, England
- Died: 11 December 1974 (aged 64) London, England
- Weight: Bantamweight, featherweight, lightweight

Boxing career

Boxing record
- Total fights: 185
- Wins: 131
- Win by KO: 36
- Losses: 42
- Draws: 11
- No contests: 1

Dave Crowley (4 May 1910 – 11 December 1974) was a British boxer. After winning an Area title at bantamweight, he moved up to featherweight, at which he challenged for a world title, before moving up again to lightweight, at which he was British champion in 1938. He went on to have several minor film roles.

== Career ==
=== Bantamweight ===
Born in London, Crowley made his professional debut in August 1929, drawing with George Crain. Initially a bantamweight, Crowley was unbeaten in his first nine fights before suffering his first defeat in December 1929 to Fred Davison, who stopped him in the third round. By late 1932 he had built up an impressive record, winning 55 of his first 64 fights, and in November beat Bill Lewis to become the Southern Area bantamweight champion. Crowley went on to face some of the top bantamweights around including losses to Panama Al Brown and Seaman Tommy Watson, and in 1934 moved up to featherweight.

=== Featherweight ===
Crowley successfully challenged Tommy Rogers in May 1934 for the Scottish Area featherweight title, taking a 15-round points decision. In June he beat Belgian champion Francois Machtens, and the following month stopped Auguste Gyde in the eleventh round. He was beaten on points in October by World featherweight champion Freddie Miller. In December he got his first British title shot when he challenged Nel Tarleton at Wembley Arena; Tarleton took a points decision to retain the title. In May 1935 he challenged for Benny Caplan's Southern Area title, but the fight ended in a draw. He beat Machtens again in September 1935.

In 1936 he travelled to the United States where he won his first fight, an 8-round points decision over Al Gillette in April. He then drew with Mike Belloise the following month, and in September challenged for Belloise's NYSAC World featherweight title at Madison Square Garden. The fight ended controversially; After being knocked down in the eighth round, Crowley was again knocked down in the ninth but claimed he was fouled. The referee judged it a valid knockdown and counted Crowley out.

=== Lightweight ===
Crowley moved up to lightweight on his return to England, with some success, beating Harry Mizler (twice), Jimmy Walsh, and Petey Sarron, and a win over George Odwell in a title eliminator set him up for a challenge for Walsh's British title in June 1938 at Anfield; Crowley took a points decision to become British champion. He won his next two fights before making a defence of his British title in December against an 18-year old Eric Boon. Boon knocked him out in the thirteenth round to take the title.

In January 1939 Crowley married showgirl Jill Leslie Clayton at a London register office.

Boon and Crowley met again for the title in December 1939, this time Boon knocking Crowley out in the seventh round. According to reports from the time, Crowley was not floored by a punch, but fell awkwardly and having strained a tendon in his leg was unable to get to his feet. Later that month, Crowley acted as compère of the revue Shoot the Works at the Royal Hippodrome, Chatham.

Crowley beat Jackie Rankin in June 1944 to take the vacant Southern Area lightweight title, but lost it in February 1945 to Dave Finn. He attempted to regain the title from Finn in September 1945, but as in their first fight, lost on points. He continued until 1946, his final fight a defeat at the hands of Billy Biddles. Having injured his left eye earlier in his career he had lost sight in it completely by 1946, prompting him to retire from boxing.

He finished with a record of 131 wins from 185 fights, with 11 draws and 42 losses.

=== After boxing ===
Crowley had first worked as a film actor in the late 1930s, having a small role in The Fugitive. After further small roles in the 1940s he acted as fight arranger and coach to Sir John Mills and Stewart Granger for Waterloo Road (1945), and acted as technical adviser for the 1953 film The Square Ring. He had further roles in The Story of William Tell (1953), The Steel Bayonet (1957), Barabbas (1961), and The Last Valley (1971).

In the 1960s he ran 'Dave's Dive' in Rome, which became popular with film actors and American ex-pats.

In the early 1970s, Crowley's sight in his right eye was deteriorating, prompting the man who took his British title from him, Eric Boon, to offer the donation of one of his eyes in 1973.

Crowley died on 11 December 1974, aged 64.
