= Tommy Paul (boxer) =

American boxer (1909–1991)

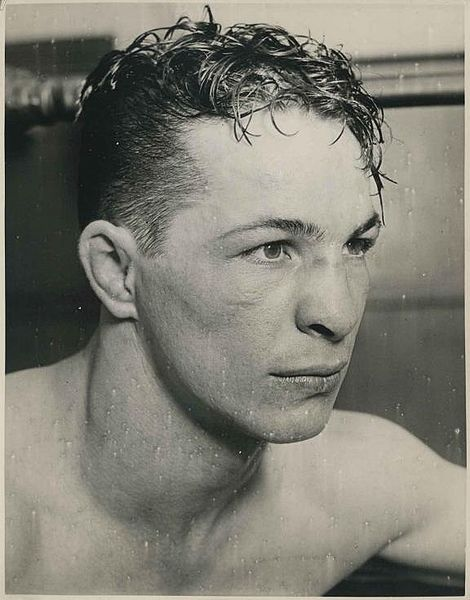

Personal information
- Nickname: Tiny Tiger
- Nationality: American
- Born: Gaetano Alfonso Papa; March 4, 1909 Buffalo, New York
- Died: April 28, 1991 (aged 82) Buffalo, New York
- Height: 5 ft 4 in (1.63 m)
- Weight: Bantamweight contender Featherweight champion

Boxing career
- Reach: 5 ft 3.5 in (1.61 m)
- Stance: Orthodox

Boxing record
- Total fights: 118
- Wins: 79
- Win by KO: 26
- Losses: 28
- Draws: 10
- No contests: 1

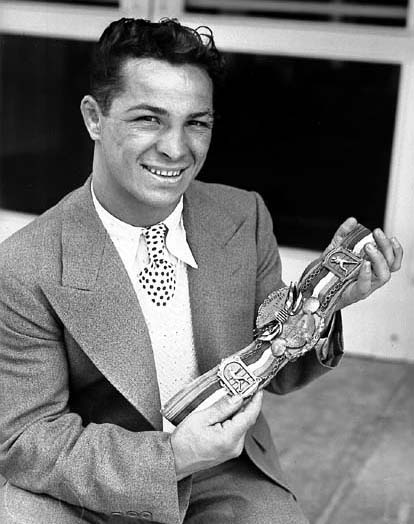
Tommy Paul

Tommy Paul (4 March 1909 – 28 April 1991) was a world featherweight boxing champion from Buffalo, New York. He won the world featherweight championship in May 1932, defeating Johnny Pena in a boxing tournament in Detroit. He was inducted into the first class of Buffalo’s Ring No. 44 Boxing Hall of Fame and in 2003 to the Greater Buffalo Sports Hall of Fame. He retired from the ring in 1935.

== Early life and amateur career ==
Paul was born to Italian immigrant parents, Vito Antonio (aka Tony Paul) Papa, Sr. and Caterina "Katie" Tomasulo on March 4, 1909, on Seventh Street in Buffalo's old waterfront district. Both his father and mother were from San Fele, province of Potenza, Basilicata. The fifth of thirteen children, Paul and his brothers Bartolomeo "Al", Michele "Mickey", and Vito Antonio "Tony, Jr.", followed their brother Tommy into the ring.

At seventeen, Paul followed his brothers into Jack Singer's gym, hoping for a tryout. Singer recognized Paul's rough abilities, and after consenting to train him, entered him in a number of tournaments. Paul began boxing as an amateur in 1926, and in 1927 won the Niagara District Amateur Bantamweight Championship in March, the Empire State Amateur Bantamweight Championship in May at Madison Square Garden, and the National Amateur Athletic Union (AAU) Bantamweight Championship in April in Boston. Paul finished as an amateur with an impressive 31-2 record. After Paul completed his amateur career, Jack Singer began acting as his manager for professional bouts. In his later career, he was managed by George Blake.

== Early professional career ==
Paul was undefeated in his first 27 fights with a record of 23-0-4. He defeated future Hall of Famer and reigning NBA world flyweight champion Frankie Genaro on January 18, 1929, in Buffalo, New York, winning in a six round unanimous decision in Paul's home town of Buffalo, New York.

In an important early career win on July 31, 1928, Paul defeated Johnny McCoy in a six round decision in Buffalo. He defeated McCoy again in a unanimous decision in Buffalo on August 14.

On December 21, 1928, Paul defeated Ansel Bell in a first round knockout in Buffalo.

In a win that helped him gain a following, on July 12, 1929, Paul defeated former flyweight contender Emil Paluso in a six round unanimous decision in Buffalo. Paluso was a prolific fly and bantamweight who had faced several champions in his career, and was rated eighth in the world among bantamweights in 1929. In a distinct victory, Paul had Paluso down in both the second and sixth rounds. Three months earlier on April 12, Paul had defeated Paluso in another six round unanimous decision in Buffalo.

Paul defeated Joey Scalfaro in a six round unanimous decision in Buffalo on October 11, 1929. Scalfaro was down in the second and sixth rounds, and suffered a cut over his eye in the second. Scalfaro was badly battered and outpunched, though twice he staggered Paul. Paul took four rounds with Scalfaro two, though neither boxer had time to box scientifically, each battering away throughout the bout.

=== Victory over Johhny Datto, 1930 ===
Paul's first clear win over Filipino boxer Johnny Datto came in a six round unanimous decision at the Broadway Auditorium in Buffalo on January 1, 1930. Paul dominated Datto with a two handed attack in the third round which included vicious left hooks to the mid-section and punches to the chin. Datto lost the initiative after the third as well as the strength to mount much of an attack. With Paul taking the initiative in the last two rounds, Datto was merely the receiver of punches, though he attempted unsuccessfully to end the bout with a last haymaker. Paul had drawn with Datto in six rounds in Buffalo in their previous bout on November 8, 1929. On May 9, 1930, Paul would defeat Datto again in a second round disqualification from a low blow by Datto. The bout may not have ended as quickly for Paul, as Datto had floored Paul in the same round with a right to the jaw for a count of nine.

On January 20, 1930, Paul defeated Eddie O'Dowd in a first round knockout at the Convention Hall in Rochester, New York. Paul commenced a furious hurricane of an attack in the opening minutes of the first round, and knocked out O'Dowd only 1:52 into the first round. Beginning with a stunning left hook, Paul threw lefts to the head of O'Dowd using foot work that had him bounding around with a spring in his step, finding new angles to continue to land his left. Two rapid lefts to the side of the head first put O'Dowd down for a count of nine, and when he rose, a studied left shot squarely to his chin ended the match.

Paul defeated Archie Bell on January 24, 1930, in an important early victory at Detroit's Olympia Stadium in a ten round points decision. The Buffalo fighter's win was decisive over the older known veteran, with the referee giving Paul seven rounds, Bell one, and two even.

=== Wins, Panama Al Brown, Bushy Graham and Phil Zwick ===
He faced the legendary reigning bantamweight champion Panama Al Brown in Buffalo, New York on March 14, 1930, with the bout ending in a six round draw.

Paul first defeated Bushy Graham, former NYSAC world bantamweight champion, on November 14, 1930, in a ten round unanimous decision in Buffalo. He was awarded six rounds and Graham three. Paul's better punching gave him the decision. Acting as the aggressor, Paul had his opponent retreating in several rounds. With solid left hooks to the head, Paul staggered Graham twice, and came out on top in most of the matches's intense, swinging mix-ups.

He fought 1941 world featherweight contender Phil Zwick in Philadelphia on April 6, 1931, winning in a ten round unanimous decision.

Paul defeated Maurice Holtzer on July 21, 1931, in a ten round unanimous decision in Philadelphia. He won an easy decision against the talented Frenchman outboxing him throughout the bout, and dominating when the two men mixed it up in close fighting.

=== Bouts with Freddie Miller ===
A few of Paul's best known matches against a future champion came against Freddie Miller with whom he had six fights, earning a record of only 2-4. Paul's first, and only complete victory over Miller came on August 31, 1931, in a ten round unanimous decision in Buffalo. Paul had lost twice to Miller in previous bouts. In one of his most complete and skillfully planned victories, Paul continuously circled right around his southpaw opponent's deadly, accurate left hand. The Buffalo boxer continuously scored with accurate rights, staggering Miller, even though his blows were not delivered with great power. At the opening of the tenth, Miller attacked Paul with a two handed barrage of blows, but Paul counterattacked and battered Miller groggy. On June 19, 1934, Paul defeated Miller due to a second round disqualification for a low-blow that dislocated Paul's hip. The late career injury may have influenced Paul to retire from boxing the following year.

On October 16, 1931, Paul defeated Andy Martin at Broadway Auditorium in Buffalo in a close, ten round unanimous decision. Two years earlier, Martin had been rated fifth in the world among bantamweights. Paul had a good early start, showing more aggression and speed in the first three rounds, but Martin battered him in the seventh and the ninth. As a result of Martin's strong finish, the decision was not widely popular with the crowd.

== Featherweight tournament, Spring, 1932 ==
After Battling Battalino vacated the title in March, 1932, a tournament was arranged to determine his successor. On February 6, 1932, Paul defeated Pete DeGrasse before 2,084 spectators in Detroit's Olympic Stadium in a ten round points decision. In the second round, Paul landed a left hook followed by a straight right that knocked DeGrasse to the floor for a count of five, but Degrasse tore into Paul after he arose with a left hook and right cross to the chin. DeGrasse then countered with a strong rally in the fourth that may have won the bout for him. In a late rally, Paul took the tenth convincingly with a two fisted attack that along with the second round knockdown turned the final points scoring in his favor. Paul was credited with six of the ten rounds, with two to DeGrasse and two even. Scotty Montieth, the organizer of the NBA world featherweight tournament, used the outcome of the bout to move Paul along to the next round, but was also impressed with DeGrasse's performance.

Paul defeated Bushy Graham on April 8, 1932, in a ten round points decision at Detroits's Olympia Stadium, in his first bout of the NBA world featherweight elimination tournament. The bout drew only a small depression era crowd of 2,645. Graham's speed, agile ducking, and elaborate footwork made him a difficult opponent on whom to land solid blows. The first six rounds were close, but Paul took the lead in the seventh when he opened a cut over Graham's right eye in a rapid exchange of hard punches, winning the round by a wide margin. Graham won the eighth with his ability to dance away from Paul, and a couple of long range clouts to Paul's jaw. Paul clinched his victory by winning the ninth by a shade, and more clearly taking the last round. Graham, who was warned three times by the referee for avoiding and not actively engaging his opponent, danced and used his fancy footwork throughout the bout, but was booed my many for throwing far too few punches at Paul.

Paul defeated Frankie Wallace on April 29, 1932, by a ten round decision in the last semi-final bout of the NBA world featherweight elimination tournament in Detroit. Many of his most telling blows were damaging left jabs.

== NBA World featherweight champion, May 1932 ==
In the final round of the tournament on May 26, 1932, Paul faced Johnny Pena for the vacant National Boxing Association World featherweight title in Detroit, Michigan. Winning handily, the referee gave Paul every round but the seventh. In that round, Pena caught Paul in a corner and battered him with straight lefts and right hooks to the head. In the eighth and ninth the fighting seemed somewhat close. By the tenth round, Paul was tiring, but he caught Pena with a blow to the cheek that caused his opponent's knees to buckle momentarily. Paul was able to take the lead for most of the remaining rounds.

In his first bout since taking the world featherweight title, on June 14, 1932, Paul lost to future Hall of Famer and former world flyweight champion Fidel LaBarba in a ten round point's decision at Los Angeles's Olympic Auditorium. In a non-title fight, LaBarba took four rounds, Paul took one, and the rest were even. LaBarba's strong left hooks connected too frequently, and by later rounds, Paul was occasionally dropping his guard leaving LaBarba easier access to land blows.

Paul lost a ten round decision to Baby Arizmendi in a non-title fight in Mexico City on September 16, 1932. In a heated bout, Arizmendi was down in the third and eighth rounds, with Paul down in the second and fourth.

=== Victory over Fidel LaBarba, 1932 ===
Before 5,296 spectators on December 29, 1932, Paul defeated Fidel LaBarba in a ten round mixed decision at Chicago Stadium, winning the world featherweight title.

== World featherweight title loss, January, 1933 ==
Before a slim depression era crowd of 5,000, Paul lost the featherweight world title to Freddie Miller at Chicago Stadium in a close fifteen round unanimous decision on January 13, 1933. In the first two rounds Paul took the lead, dealt blows to Miller all around the ring, and knocked him spinning into the ropes in the third. In the early fourth, the tide turned and Miller took the lead, feinting with his right, and bringing damage to bear with his left. For much of the remainder of the bout, Miller swung his left to the jaw and right to the head effectively, taking a commanding lead in points scoring.

In an important contest, Paul drew with future NBA world featherweight champion, Syrian-American Petey Sarron in eight rounds on April 25, 1933, in Alexandria, Virginia. Although the referee had Paul winning the bout, both judges ruled for a draw. The following month, on May 9, Paul drew again with Sarron in a ten round points decision in Alexandria.

Paul defeated George Hansford on November 10, 1933, at Hollywood's Legion Stadium in a ten round points decision. Hansford fought many of the top rated bantam and featherweight boxer's of his era, and maintained a winning record. In a close bout, Paul was dropped for a nine count in the second, but came back to take six rounds according to the Pittsburgh Press. Abe Roth, the referee, gave 5 rounds to Paul, with three to Hansford, and two even. Paul would lose to Hansford the following month, and break his collarbone in another loss on February 16, 1934. In a final loss by fourth round knockout to Hansford on August 24, 1934, in Los Angeles's Legion Stadium, Paul was knocked twice to the canvas in the second round, and twice in the fourth. In an exceptionally brutal bout, both boxers were knocked to the canvas several times in less than eight minutes of fighting. Paul managed to take the third after being down twice in the second. In the fourth, a terrific blow by Hansford dropped Paul for a no count but caused him to stagger around the ring when he arose, allowing Hansford to wing rapid blows from many angles. Hansford finally delivered a hard right that collapsed Paul on his face, ending the bout.

=== Draw with champion Kid Chocolate, 1934 ===
On May 22, 1934, Paul drew with former world junior lightweight champion, Cuban boxer Kid Chocolate in a ten round points decision before a modest crowd of 4,500 at Los Angeles's Olympic Stadium. The Kid jabbed Paul repeatedly with his potent left, and occasional right cross, taking a lead in four of the ten rounds. Paul was credited with three rounds, with three even and four for The Kid. The Kid appeared ahead going into the final round, but a fast rally by Paul stemmed the tide, and the referee declared a draw decision.

== Life after boxing ==
He retired from boxing in 1935 and continued work as a boxing trainer.

Paul was married to Edith Bucco (nee Ida Longobucco) and had one son and three daughters. He and his wife had twelve grandchildren, and twenty-four great-grandchildren. Paul died after a long illness of congestive heart failure in North Buffalo, New York on April 28, 1991, and was buried in Buffalo's Mount Olivet Cemetery.

Achievements
Preceded by Battling Battalino; Vacated	NBA Featherweight Champion; 26 May 1932 - 13 Jan 1933	Succeeded by Freddie Miller
