= Bobby Gray (boxer) =

American boxer

Personal information
- Nationality: (United States) American
- Weight: Lightweight

Boxing career

Boxing record
- Total fights: 164
- Wins: 74
- Win by KO: 11
- Losses: 54
- Draws: 35

Bobby Gray was an American boxer who lived in San Jose, California. He was active from 1922 to 1937.

== Boxing career ==
Bobby Gray started off his career with a draw against Ernie Owens. He won his next three fights, but lost the next one to Johnny Welch. He fought in many more fights afterwards. His total career record came out to 74 wins (11 by KO), 54 losses, and 35 draws. Overall, he had competed in over 164 fights (with one draw by newspaper decision).
