= Maurice Holtzer =

French featherweight boxer (1906–1989)

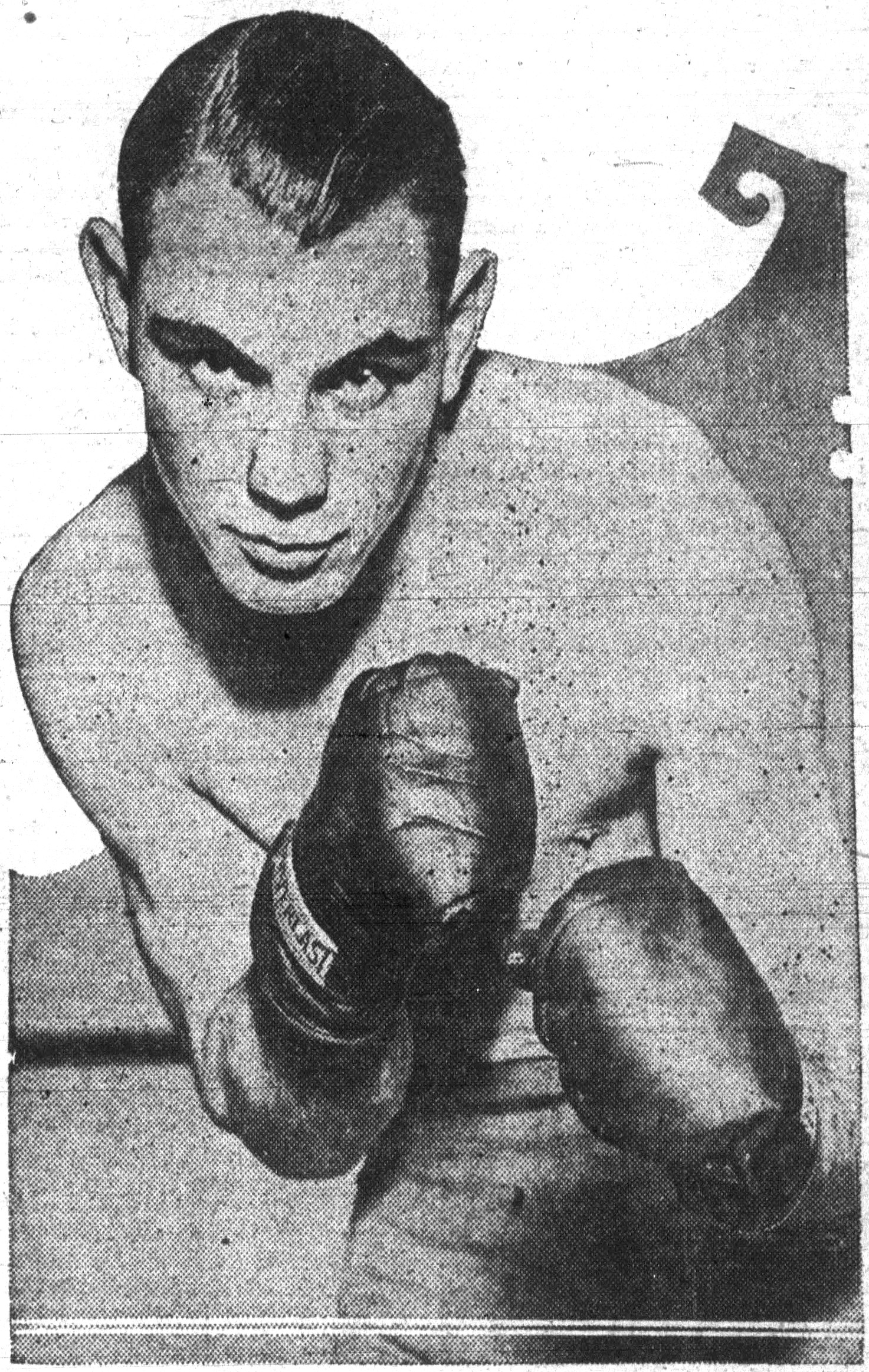
- Holtzer, circa 1930

Personal information
- Nationality: French France
- Born: Maurice Holtzer; 21 January 1906 Troyes, Aube, France
- Died: January 14, 1989 (aged 82)
- Height: 5 ft 6.5 in (168.9 cm)
- Weight: featherweight

Boxing career
- Stance: Orthodox

Boxing record
- Total fights: 155
- Wins: 114
- Win by KO: 30
- Losses: 33
- Draws: 8

Maurice Holtzer (21 January 1906 – 14 January 1989), was a French boxer, who in the 1930s won the French, European, and International Boxing Union (IBU) World featherweight championships. Holtzer clearly defeated the reigning NBA World featherweight champion, American Freddie Miller, on a points decision in 1935, but the bout was not for the title.

== Early life and career ==
Maurice Holtzer was born in Aube, France on 21 December 1906 to a Jewish family.

=== Boxing in America ===
In his early boxing career, Holtzer fought in America from 1928 through 1931, facing some of America's best. These included boxers who would hold world championship titles, among them Louis "Kid" Kaplan, Frankie Klick, Bud Taylor, and Tommy Paul as well as British and Canadian champion Al Foreman and accomplished Americans Eddie Mack and Harry Forbes. Holtzer was managed, at least for a portion of his career, by American Lew Burston whose clients included the champion Pete Sanstol. In America, he was managed for a time by Eddie Walker.

In one of his early bouts in America, Holtzer drew with Lew Massey on 12 August 1929, at the Arena in Philadelphia in a ten-round points decision. Massey would face top talent during his career including Henry Armstrong, Tippy Larkin, and Sammy Angott.

On 3 January 1930, Holtzer defeated future junior lightweight world champion American Frankie Klick at Hollywood's Legion Stadium in a ten-round points decision. Klick had the fighting his own way in the first half of the match, but as he began to tire in the fifth, Holtzer took the lead in scoring with a fast series of telling body punches.

Fighting the skilled American world lightweight contender, Eddie Mack, on 25 February 1930, at Los Angeles's Olympic Stadium, Holtzer lost in a close ten round points decision. Fighting with his rushing style, crouching defense and carefully placed deceptive blows, Holtzer retained more energy in the closing rounds where he nearly overtook his opponent's lead, and the decision for Mack was booed at the end by the crowd. At 5 ft 9 in (175 cm), Mack's significant height and reach advantage may have aided him in his victory.

In an impressive win, Holtzer defeated former World bantamweight champion Bud Taylor in a ten-round bout that was the main event on 10 November 1930 in Los Angeles. The Los Angeles Times wrote that Holtzer landed twelve blows to each of Taylor's and that Taylor, being soundly trounced, had difficulty punching back.

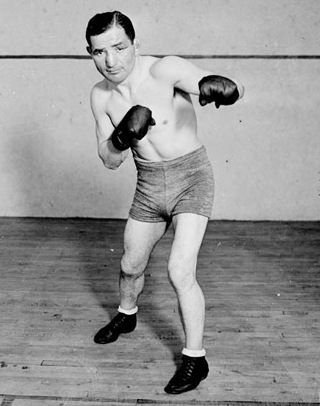
"Kid" Kaplan

In an early career loss on 30 June 1930, Holtzer fell to former World featherweight champion Louis "Kid" Kaplan in a ten-round points decision at West Springfield, Massachusetts. Though enjoying a height advantage of several inches, Holtzer was outweighed by his accomplished opponent who was five pounds heavier and fought as a junior lightweight. The Montreal Gazette felt the fight may have been close at times, as it oddly considered the outcome a draw.

As a 127 featherweight, nearing the modern junior lightweight range, on 30 July 1930, Holtzer met Montreal native Al Foreman in Montreal in a non-title bout, losing in a ten-round points decision. Foreman would take both the British and Canadian lightweight championships during his career. In a difficult and painful match, Holtzer struck Foreman low as many as seven times, and was repeatedly warned for the infraction by the referee. Holtzer fared best in the ninth and tenth as Foreman tired, but in much of the bout, his opponent forced the fighting, and chased an elusive Holtzer whose best defence was his frequent crouch or a block with his gloves.

Holtzer, 1930

Winning in a ten-round points decision at Olympic Stadium in Los Angeles on 14 October 1930, Holtzer defeated Goldie Hess, a boxer who would face some of the greatest lightweights of his era including Tony Canzoneri, Jack "Kid" Berg, and Barney Ross. Holtzer had a slight advantage throughout the bout, which was fought furiously, but Hess was expected to win by the fans. The closing round had the audience on their feet. Holtzer won six rounds with a strong attack to the body, with Hess taking two, and two even.

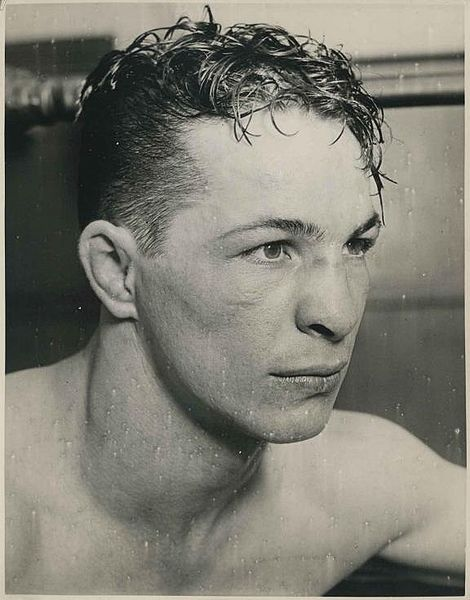
Tommy Paul

On 23 March 1931, Holtzer lost to Italian American Tommy Paul, a future World featherweight champion, in a tenth round unanimous decision at the Arena in Philadelphia. Paul was said to have outboxed Holtzer and to have easily carried the decision. Holtzer's eyes were damaged by the constant pounding he took in the early rounds, but the pace slowed by the ninth and tenth.

Returning to Great Britain, Holtzer lost to Jimmy Walsh on 5 September 1934 in a sixth round disqualification in Wandsworth. Walsh was said to have boxed brilliantly in the bout which would have won another four rounds. Walsh would hold the British lightweight title in April 1936, when he defeated Jack "Kid" Berg. He would lose to Walsh again on 1 October 1934 in a ten-round points decision in Kensington.

=== French Feather champion ===
First taking the French featherweight title on 14 December 1934 in a twelve-round points decision at Salle Wagram, Paris, against Francis Augier, Holtzer identified himself as a serious contender for both the World and European titles.

==== Defeating World feather champion ====
Fighting one of his most accomplished opponents in one of his most unexpected victories, Holtzer defeated American Freddie Miller, the reigning World featherweight champion, on 11 February 1935 in a ten-round points decision at the Palais de Sports, in Paris. Miller, who may have not been fighting his best match in the non-title bout, won only three rounds with Holtzer taking six and one being declared even. There were no knockdowns, and Holtzer excelled at the hard and heavy close range in-fighting. The loss was the first for Miller in several months. According to one source, Miller may have outboxed or used superior defensive skills in the bout, but Holtzer showed more aggressiveness, taking the fight to his opponent. The majority of the American judges clearly gave the bout to Holtzer on points.

=== EBU European feather champion ===
In one of the most important fights of his career Holtzer first won the EBU European featherweight title against Italian Vittorio Tamagnini at the Velodrome in Paris in a fifteen-round points decision on 26 March 1935 The decision was unpopular with the crowd, and though both men were within a pound of weight, Holtzer had a slight advantage in height.

He successfully defended both his EBU European and French Featherweight titles on 11 January 1936 against Georges LePerson in a 13-round TKO at the Central Sporting Club in Paris.

Holtzer defended only his EBU European featherweight title on 11 June 1936 by defeating Stan Basta in Brno, Czech, Republic, in a fifteen-round points decision.

=== IBU World feather champion ===
On 5 October 1937, Holtzer took the vacant International Boxing Union World featherweight title and defended the EBU European featherweight title by defeating Phil Dolhem in Algiers, Algeria in a fifteen-round decision.

Before an impressive audience of 10,000, Holtzer defended the IBU World featherweight and EBU European featherweight championships in a widely publicized match on 19 February 1938, drawing with southpaw Maurice Dubois in 15 rounds in Geneva, Switzerland. Dubois slowed in the fourth, fifth and sixth rounds. Holter's best blow was a right hook to the eye in the eleventh which affected Dubois throughout the bout. Duboise had been working as a messenger boy for the League of Nations for nine years, and many league officials found his work as a pugilist inappropriate due to the peace mission of his employer. Holtzer lost his World championship only three months later, in May 1938, when the IBU stripped all of its title holders of their titles in an effort to have only one universally recognized World champion for each weight class.

=== Life after boxing ===
After boxing retirement, Holtzer ran a saloon in Paris in the late 1940s near the Palais de Sports.

In February 1941, Holtzer was appointed to a committee that would govern the rules for French boxing by Jean Borotra, the General Commissioner for Education and Sports. Many were disappointed that the committee based in Vichy, France, had omitted many great French champions from Borotra's selections, particularly the popular heavyweight Georges Carpentier.

Holtzer attended an honorary in Paris on 1 November 1949, for French middleweight boxer Marcel Cerdan who had died the former week in a plane crash. A crowd of 15,000 listened to the Marseilles as a spotlight hit an empty ring to honor the fallen champion.

Holtzer died on 14 January 1989.

== Selected fights ==
7 Wins, 3 Losses, 1 draw
Result	Opponent(s)	Date	Location	Duration	Notes
Win	Frankie Klick	3 Jan 1930	Los Angeles	10 Rounds	Klick was future World jr. light champ
Loss	Al Foreman	30 July 1930	Montreal	10 Rounds	Foreman was Brit. light champ
Win	Bud Taylor	10 Nov 1930	Los Angeles	10 Rounds	Taylor was former World bantam champ
Loss	Tommy Paul	23 Mar 1931	Philadelphia	10 Rounds	Paul would be 1932 World bantam champ
Loss	Georges LePerson	5 Jun 1932	LeHavre	12 Rounds	For French feather title
Win	Francis Augier	14 Dec 1934	Paris	12 Rounds	Won French feather title
Win	Vittorio Tamagnini	26 Mar 1935	Paris	15 Rounds	Won EBU Europ. feather title Retained French feather title
Win	Georges LePerson	11 Jan 1936	Paris	13 Round; TKO	Retained EBU Europ. feather title Retained French feather title
Win	Freddie Miller	24 Oct 1936	Johannesburg, SA	15 Rounds	*Miller was NBA World feather champ*
Win	Phil Dolhem	5 Oct 1937	Algiers	15 Rounds	Won IBU World feather title
Draw	Maurice Dubois	19 Feb 1938	Geneva	15 Rounds	Retained World and Europ. feather Titles; Stripped of World title, 38 May 1938

== See also ==
- EBU European featherweight champions
