= Nel Tarleton =

British boxer (1906–1956)

Personal information
- Nickname: Nella
- Nationality: British
- Born: Nelson Tarleton; 14 February 1906 Liverpool, Lancashire, England
- Died: 12 January 1956 (aged 49)
- Weight: Featherweight

Boxing career

Boxing record
- Total fights: 144
- Wins: 116
- Win by KO: 41
- Losses: 20
- Draws: 8

Nelson "Nel" Tarleton (14 February 1906 – 12 January 1956) Former British and Commonwealth featherweight boxing champion . He was the British featherweight champion on three occasions. Tarleton was one of only seven fighters to win two or more Lonsdale Belts outright, being also the first boxer to win the Lonsdale Belt outright twice, he challenged twice for the NBA and The Ring title the first on 20 September 1934 at Liverpool Football Club stadium Anfield and again on 12 June 1935 at Stanley Greyhound Stadium (Liverpool) losing both times to American boxer Freddie Miller.

== Boxing style ==
Tarleton lacked a punch, but was immensely skillful, winning most of his important fights on points. He was tall and very thin. He had only one lung from the age of two, but was still able to box successfully until he was 42.

== Professional career ==
Born in Liverpool, Tarleton had his first professional fight on 14 January 1926 (his twentieth birthday), when he beat George Sankey on points over ten rounds at Liverpool Stadium.

He built up an impressive domestic record, with only the occasional defeat, fighting most of his bouts in his hometown of Liverpool. Then, in October 1929, he went to the United States and had a number of fights in various venues in New York City, scoring five wins, two losses, and one draw.

== British featherweight title ==
His next fight, in November 1930, was a title challenge against the British featherweight champion, Johnny Cuthbert. The pair fought a fifteen-round draw in Liverpool Stadium. In October 1931, the pair had a rematch at Anfield Football Ground, and this time Tarleton won on points.

In November 1932, he defended his British title against Tommy Watson, in Liverpool Stadium, and lost on points.

== Title regained ==
In July 1934, Tarleton had a re-match with Watson, at Anfield, and regained his title with another point win.

Two months later Tarleton challenged the top American Freddie Miller for the vacant world featherweight title. The fight was held in Liverpool. Miller won on points after fifteen hard fought rounds.

In December 1934, Tarleton successfully defended his British title against Dave Crowley at the Empire Pool, Wembley. A win that gave Tarleton the Lonsdale Belt outright.

In June 1935 Tarleton had a rematch with Freddie Miller for the world featherweight title. The fight was again held in Liverpool, and again Miller won on points to retain the title.

In May 1936, he defended his British title against Johnny King of Manchester, defeating him on points.

In September 1936, he defended his title again, against Johnny McGrory. The fight was held at Anfield, and McGrory won on points to take Tarleton’s title.

== Third title ==
In February 1940, Tarleton fought once again for the British featherweight title. The match was against the reigning champion, Johnny Cusick, and was also contested for the Commonwealth title. Tarleton emerged victorious on points at Liverpool Stadium, securing the British title for the third time.

In November 1940, he successfully defended his British and Commonwealth titles at Liverpool Stadium, facing Tom Smith of Sunderland and winning on points.

Tarleton continued to compete until February 1945, when he defended his British and Commonwealth featherweight titles against Al Phillips at Belle Vue, Manchester. Despite being 39 years old, Tarleton triumphed on points against his 25-year-old opponent, retaining his titles.

Tarleton did not defend his titles again but relinquished them in February 1947, at the age of 41.

After retiring, Tarleton grappled with declining health and died at the age of 49. He left behind his wife, Barbara, as well as a twin boy and girl.

== See also ==
- List of British featherweight boxing champions
