= Phil Zwick =

American boxer

Personal information
- Nationality: American
- Born: Phillip Zwick; September 29, 1906 Appleton, Wisconsin
- Died: July 8, 1963 (aged 56)
- Weight: Featherweight

Boxing career
- Stance: Southpaw

Boxing record
- Total fights: 120
- Wins: 81
- Win by KO: 45
- Losses: 30
- Draws: 8
- No contests: 1

Phil Zwick (September 29, 1906 - July 8, 1963) was an American boxer from Wisconsin.

Zwick became a professional boxer in 1923. In 1928, he fought former bantamweight champion Bud Taylor in Milwaukee where he lost by knockout. He fought future featherweight champion Freddie Miller in 1931 and also lost by knockout. He met another future champion in 1931, Tommy Paul, but Zwick lost that bout by unanimous decision. Zwick received a shot at the National Boxing Association featherweight title in 1941. Champion Petey Scalzo and he fought to a draw. It was Zwick's only title shot. He retired from boxing in 1951.
