= Johnny Cusick =

English boxer

Johnny "Nipper" Cusick
Personal information
- Nickname: Nipper
- Nationality: English
- Born: 27 January 1916 Hulme, Manchester, England
- Died: 1 March 1990 (aged 74)
- Weight: Bantamweight, Featherweight, Lightweight, and Welterweight

Boxing career

Boxing record
- Total fights: 85
- Wins: 68 (KO 12)
- Losses: 14 (KO 2)
- Draws: 3

Johnny "Nipper" Cusick (27 January 1916 – 1 March 1990) was an English professional bantam/feather/light/welterweight boxer of the 1930s and 1940s who won the British Boxing Board of Control (BBBofC) Northern (England) Area featherweight title, BBBofC British featherweight title, and British Empire featherweight title. His professional fighting weight varied from 117 lb (53 kg; 8 st 5 lb), i.e. Bantamweight to 140 lb (64 kg; 10 st 0 lb), i.e. Welterweight. Johnny Cusick was managed by John Bennett.
