= Eric Boon =

British boxer and actor (1919–1981)

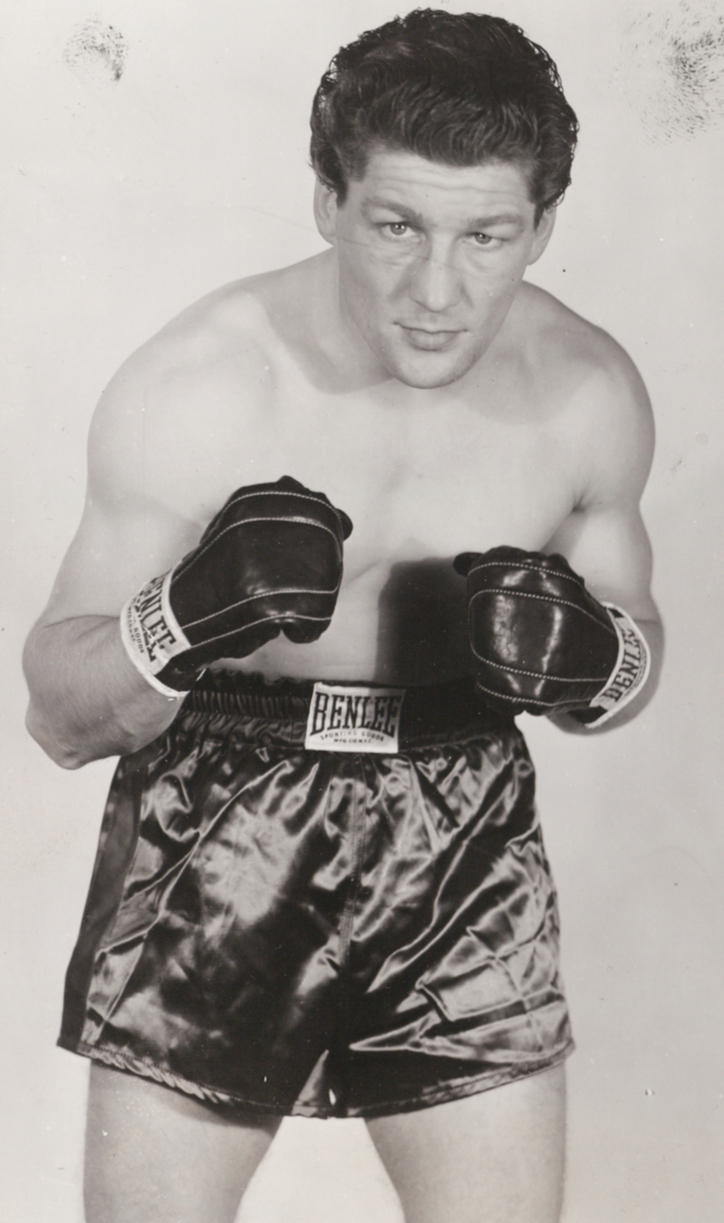

Personal information
- Nationality: English
- Born: 28 December 1919 Chatteris, Cambridgeshire, England
- Died: 19 January 1981 (aged 61)
- Height: 5 ft 8 in (1.73 m)
- Weight: Lightweight

Boxing career
- Stance: Orthodox

Boxing record
- Total fights: 119
- Wins: 92
- Win by KO: 62
- Losses: 21
- Draws: 5

Eric Boon (28 December 1919 – 19 January 1981) was a champion British lightweight boxer. Born in Chatteris, Cambridgeshire, he was known by the nicknames Boy Boon and the Fen Tiger. Of a total of 119 fights, he won 92 (KO 62), lost 21 (KO 13) and drew 5.

He beat Dave Crowley on 15 December 1938 to become British Lightweight Champion, a title he held for three years until 12 August 1944. His match against Arthur Danahar from the Harringay Arena was the first televised boxing match, broadcast on BBC television and shown live in several cinemas on 23 February 1939.

Boon v Danaher was the first occasion that the BBC had been permitted to televise a boxing match but also the first time a transmission had been shown live to a paying audience in cinemas (the Marble Arch Pavilion and the Tatler News Theatre). This was achieved on Baird projection equipment using a 16-inch projection tube running at 45,000 volts, producing light levels comparable to that of normal films. Each projection unit contained two projection tubes, one acting as a backup in case the first one failed. This preceded the first televised heavyweight boxing match (Max Baer vs Lou Nova, from Yankee Stadium) which was held on 1 June 1939.

Boon married Wendy Elliot in 1940 and, following his retirement from the sport, played a number of small roles in British films such as Champagne Charlie and Carry On Sergeant. He died from a heart attack on 19 January 1981 in Soham, Cambridgeshire.
