= George Odwell =

English boxer

Personal information
- Nationality: British
- Born: 15 February 1911 Camden Town, London
- Died: 11 July 1995 (aged 84)
- Weight: Welterweight

Boxing career

Boxing record
- Total fights: 210
- Wins: 159
- Win by KO: 111
- Losses: 39
- Draws: 12

George Odwell (15 February 1911 – 11 July 1995) was a British professional boxer who was active from 1930 to 1945 and boxed in the welterweight division. He fought a recorded 210 times in his 15 year-career and is currently ranked 7th on the boxers with the most knockouts.

== Career ==
Odwell began his career in 1930 with a match against Tom Daniels which Odwell won by knockout victory in the 3rd round.

Odwell defeated Jack Kid Berg on 1 November 1937 by technical knockout in the 7th round of a 12-round bout.

Odwell has been ranked as one of Britain's top 500 fighters.

Odwell died on 11 July 1995.
