= Panama Al Brown =

Panamanian boxer (1902-1951)

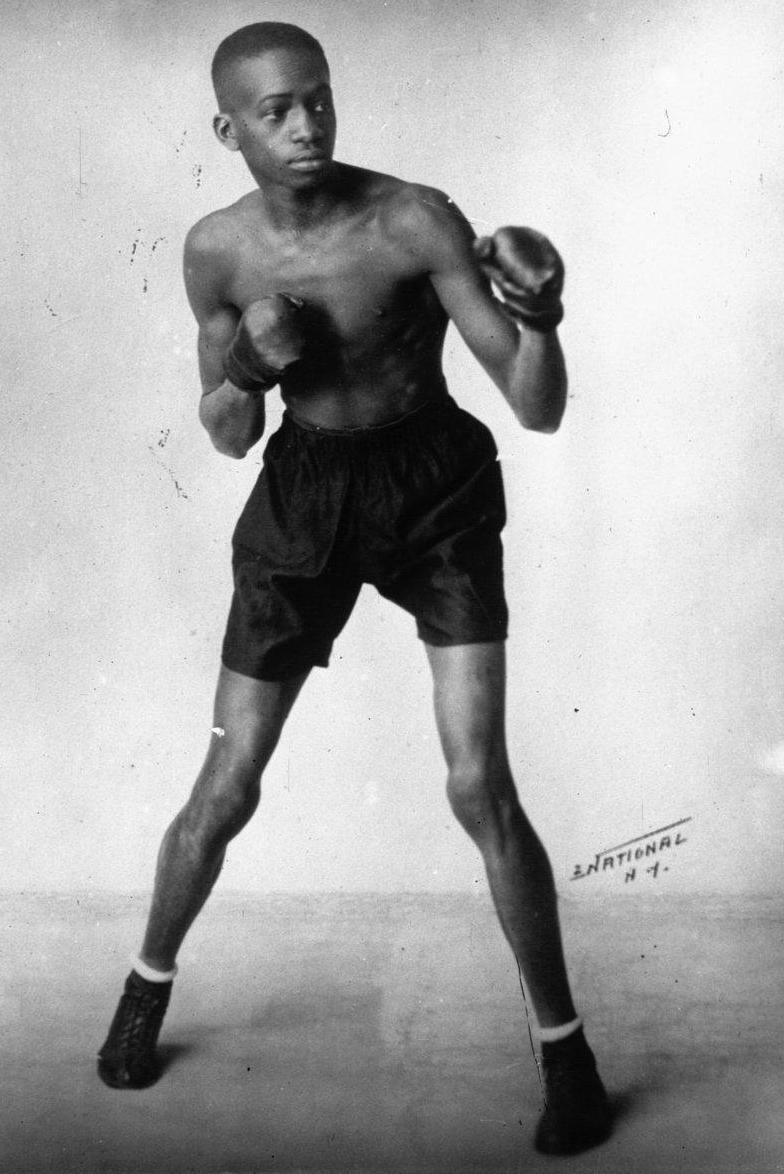
- Brown in 1926

Personal information
- Nicknames: Panama Al Brown; Kid Theophilo
- Nationality: (Panama) Panamanian
- Born: Alfonso Teofilo Brown; July 5, 1902 Colón, Panama
- Died: April 11, 1951 (aged 48) New York City, United States
- Height: 5 ft 9 in (175 cm)
- Weight: Flyweight; Bantamweight; Featherweight

Boxing career
- Reach: 72.5 in (184 cm)
- Stance: Orthodox

Boxing record
- Total fights: 163
- Wins: 131
- Win by KO: 59
- Losses: 20
- Draws: 12

Alfonso Teofilo Brown (July 5, 1902 – April 11, 1951), better known as Panama Al Brown, was a Panamanian professional boxer. He made history by becoming boxing's first Latin American world champion, and is widely regarded as one of the greatest bantamweight boxers in history.

Brown won the NYSAC and lineal bantamweight titles in 1929 after defeating Gregorio Vidal. In 1930, he won both the NBA and IBU bantamweight titles, after defeating Johnny Erickson and Eugène Huat. After relocating to Paris, France, Brown became known within the gay nightlife of the time for his flamboyant lifestyle and his interest in the arts, performing in a cabaret.

As an Afro-Panamanian in the US, Brown faced racial barriers throughout his boxing career, and had been stripped of the NYSAC and NBA titles by 1934. He held the IBU title until 1935, when he lost it to Baltasar Sangchili.

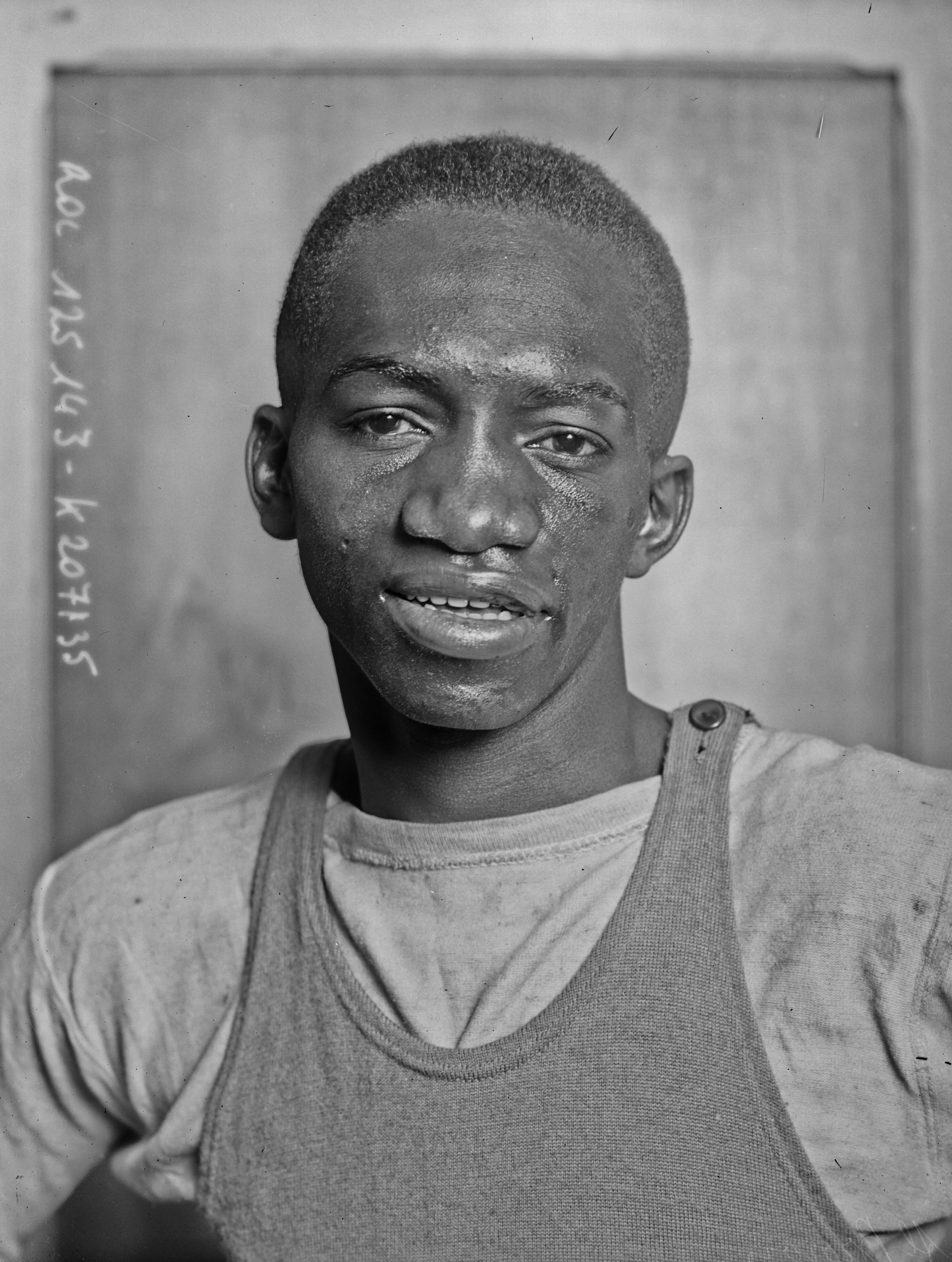
Panama Al Brown (1927)

In 1938, Brown fought for the IBU bantamweight title again in a rematch with Sangchili, winning on points. He continued to box until 1942, but failed to achieve the same level of success he had previously enjoyed. In 2002, Brown was named one of the 80 best fighters of the past 80 years by The Ring magazine. He currently ranks #5 in BoxRec's ranking of the greatest bantamweight boxers in history. He has been inducted into the International Boxing Hall of Fame.

== Early life ==
Alfonso Teofilo Brown was born on July 5, 1902, to Afro-Caribbean immigrants in the City of Colón, Panama. His father, Horace Brown, died when Brown was 13, and his mother, Esther Lashley, worked as a cleaner. His first exposure to boxing came while working as a young adult clerk for the United States Shipping Board, at the Panama Canal Zone, witnessing American soldiers boxing.

== Professional career ==
=== Early career ===
Brown turned professional in 1922 under the guidance of manager Dave Lumiansky. His first fight took place on March 19, 1922, when he beat Jose Moreno by a decision in six at Colon. By his seventh fight, December 13 of that same year, he beat Sailor Patchett by a fifteen-round decision, to earn the Panamanian 'Isthmus' flyweight title.

On September 22, 1923, he had his first fight abroad, drawing in four rounds with Johnny Breslin, in New York. He very quickly established a presence upon relocating to the city in 1923. His rise was rapid; a year after his move to New York, The Ring magazine rated him the third best flyweight in the world; two years later, the sixth best bantamweight.

Brown began campaigning extensively across the United States before he suffered his first loss, at the hands of Jimmy Russo on December 6, 1924, by decision in twelve. He would later avenge that defeat, and he beat Davey Abad and Willie LaMorte before being disqualified in the first round against Frankie Murray on June 11, 1925. Despite that setback, he kept on campaigning successfully, fighting for the first time in his career at Madison Square Garden on May 21, 1926, against Teddy Silva. Brown won with a third-round knockout. On October 14, 1928, he was listed as the National Boxing Association (NBA) bantamweight champion. On November 10 of that year, he knocked out Antoine Merlo in his Paris debut, at the Salle Wagram.

He enjoyed Paris so much that he decided to stay there for the rest of his life. In Paris he trained under Eugene Bullard who served as a fighter pilot in World War I. He became a hugely popular boxer in France, and fought on the European continent 40 times between 1929 and 1934. Over the next three years, he beat several fighters there, including former world champion Eugene Criqui.

An interesting case happened when he fought Gustav Humery, on January 29, 1929. Brown and Humery had previously agreed that they would not salute by touching gloves before the fight, and when the bell rang, Brown struck quickly, breaking Humery's jaw with his first punch and sending him to the floor. With the referee's count of ten seconds, the fight lasted a total of fifteen seconds, one of the quickest knockouts in boxing history.

=== World bantamweight champion ===
On June 18, 1929, Brown made history by becoming the world's first Latin American world champion. He beat Gregorio Vidal by a fifteen-round decision to win the vacant NYSAC and lineal bantamweight titles at the Queensboro Stadium, Long Island. He became a national idol in Panama, and an instant celebrity almost everywhere else in Latin America. Magazines such as Ring En Español were still talking about his achievement sixty years later. Soon after he lost a ten-round, non-title fight to Battling Battalino. He was then awarded the NBA bantamweight title on October 8, 1929. However, he was briefly stripped of his NBA title on February 3, 1930. On February 8, 1930, Brown beat Johnny Erickson by disqualification in the first defense of his NYSAC title. On October 4, 1930, he beat Eugène Huat by unanimous decision to claim the IBU bantamweight title, and was thus reinstated as NBA champion.

On July 30, 1933, Brown defended his IBU title against British bantamweight champion Johnny King, at Kings Hall, Manchester. Brown knocked King down several times during the early rounds, though King fought on. During the seventh round King caught Brown with a right, almost knocking him out, but Brown managed to hold on for a points decision.

On February 19, 1934, Brown defended his IBU title against Young Perez at the Palais des Sports, Paris, in what would be the first of three encounters between the two boxers. Brown had a significant height and reach advantage, and proved too much for the Tunisian, who lost on points. Shortly after the NBA stripped Brown of his title for failing to defend it against their leading contender Rodolfo Casanova.

Brown retained his title nine times and had countless other fights before a rematch with Humery that ended in disaster: on May 17, 1934, Brown was disqualified in round six at Paris for using illegal tactics. A riot started and Brown suffered several broken bones and was sent into semi-unconsciousness by fans before the police could help him. Twenty minutes later, the locale where the rematch was held had almost been entirely destroyed.

For his next title defense, on November 1 of the same year, he travelled to Tunis, for his second encounter with Young Perez. Perez was counted out in round ten while on the floor, claiming that Brown had hit him with an illegal blow.

On June 1, 1935, Brown lost the title to Baltasar Sangchili by a fifteen-round decision, at the Plaza de Toros, in Valencia, Spain. After the loss he chose to retire from boxing, instead performing in a cabaret. Suffering from the prolonged effects of drug use, he was persuaded by Jean Cocteau to detox, receiving treatment at the Sainte-Anne Asylum, and begin training for a comeback to boxing. His first fight was against former French bantamweight champion Andre Regis, at the Salle Wagram, Paris, on September 21, 1937. Brown achieving a first-round knockout. He had a rematch with Sangchili on March 4, 1938, avenging his earlier loss with a fifteen-round decision to win the vacant IBU bantamweight title, but by this time the International Boxing Union was no longer recognized in the United States. His rematch win over Sangchili is believed to be his last great night, and, bowing to Cocteau's wishes, Brown vowed to retire after one more fight. That came in 1939 against Valentin Angelmann in Paris, Brown stopped him in eight rounds.

=== Later career ===
With the advent of the World War II, Brown moved to the United States, settled in Harlem and tried to find work of the cabaret sort he performed in Paris when not fighting. There was none and before long he was fighting again, but not well.

Brown went on fighting until 1942, challenging unsuccessfully for the Panamanian Featherweight title on September 30, 1942, when he drew with Leocadio Torres, but retiring as a winner, defeating Kid Fortune by a decision in ten rounds on December 4 of the same year.

Not long after, he was arrested for using cocaine and deported for a year. He went back to New York afterward and, in his late 40s, took a lot of beatings while serving as a sparring partner for up-and-comers at a gym in Harlem, making a dollar a round.

Brown died penniless of tuberculosis in New York City in 1951. He had fainted on 42nd Street. The police thought he was drunk and took him to the station. Eventually he was transferred to Sea View Hospital. He died there on April 11, unaware that not long before, one of the newspapers in Paris had begun talks about organizing a fund drive to pay for his trip home.

During five years of investigation, Spanish painter Eduardo Arroyo wrote a biography of Panama Al Brown, titled Panama Al Brown, 1902-1951, first published by Edition Jean-Claude Lattès, Paris, in 1982.

Panama Al Brown's final record is believed to have been 123 wins, 18 defeats and 10 draws, with 55 knockouts, placing him in the exclusive list of boxers who have won 50 or more wins by knockout. He was the recognized bantamweight world champion for six years and over that time made 10 title defenses against 8 different contenders, the best bantamweights and featherweights of his era.

== Personal life ==
Brown quickly fell in love with Paris, and as a result spent much of his life there. He was noted for dressing elegantly, and enjoyed the night life of the city, frequenting bars and jazz clubs. Brown was gay and was involved in a long-term romantic relationship with Jean Cocteau. He owned a number of cars including a 1929 Packard 645 Sport, and several Bugattis. He joined Josephine Baker's La Revue nègre as a tap-dancer, and made his cabaret debut as a song-and-dance man at the Caprice Viennoise.

During the early 1930s, Brown contracted syphilis, and suffered from sores on his back. He recovered well enough to continue his boxing career, though without antibiotics it remains unknown as to what extent he overcame the infection.

== Professional boxing record ==
All information in this section is derived from BoxRec, unless otherwise stated.

=== Official record ===
163 fights	129 wins	19 losses
By knockout	59	0
By decision	66	16
By disqualification	4	3
Draws	12	
Newspaper decisions/draws	3	

All newspaper decisions are officially regarded as “no decision” bouts and are not counted in the win/loss/draw column.

No.	Result	Record	Opponent	Type	Round	Date	Location	Notes
163	Win	129–19–12 (3)	Kid Fortune	PTS	10	December 4, 1943	Club Tropical, Colon City, Panama	
162	Draw	128–19–12 (3)	Leocadio Torres	PTS	10	August 30, 1942	Estadio Olimpico, Panama City, Panama	For vacant Panamanian featherweight title
161	Loss	128–19–11 (3)	Eduardo Carrasco	PTS	10	March 8, 1942	Estadio Olimpico, Panama City, Panama	
160	Loss	128–18–11 (3)	Eduardo Carrasco	PTS	10	October 26, 1941	Gimnasio Nacional, Panama City, Panama	
159	Win	128–17–11 (3)	Kid Fortune	KO	2 (10)	September 7, 1941	Gimnasio Nacional, Panama City, Panama	
158	Win	127–17–11 (3)	Battling Nelson	KO	4 (10)	July 26, 1941	Gimnasio Nacional, Panama City, Panama	
157	Win	126–17–11 (3)	Leocadio Torres	KO	8 (10)	July 14, 1941	Gimnasio Nacional, Panama City, Panama	
156	Win	125–17–11 (3)	Mariano Arilla	KO	3 (8)	May 6, 1939	Rockland Palace, New York City, New York, U.S.	
155	Win	124–17–11 (3)	Cristobal Jaramillo	TKO	4 (10)	April 22, 1939	Rockland Palace, New York City, New York, U.S.	
154	Win	123–17–11 (3)	Valentin Angelmann	KO	8 (10)	April 13, 1938	Palais des Sports, Paris, France	
153	Win	122–17–11 (3)	Baltasar Sangchili	SD	15	March 4, 1938	Palais des Sports, Paris, France	Won vacant IBU bantamweight title
152	Win	121–17–11 (3)	Victor Perez	KO	5 (10)	December 22, 1937	Salle Wagram, Paris, France	
151	Win	120–17–11 (3)	Joseph Decico	PTS	10	November 26, 1937	Salle Wagram, Paris, France	
150	Win	119–17–11 (3)	Francis Augier	KO	2 (10)	October 8, 1937	Salle Communale de Plainpalais, Geneva, Switzerland	
149	Win	118–17–11 (3)	Maurice Huguenin	KO	3 (10)	September 23, 1937	Salle Wagram, Paris, France	
148	Win	117–17–11 (3)	Andre Regis	KO	1 (15)	September 9, 1937	Salle Wagram, Paris, France	
147	Loss	116–17–11 (3)	Pete Sanstol	UD	10	September 13, 1935	Bislet Stadium, Oslo, Norway	
146	Loss	116–16–11 (3)	Baltasar Sangchili	PTS	15	June 1, 1935	Plaza de Toros, Valencia, Comunidad Valenciana, Spain	Lost The Ring bantamweight title
145	Win	116–15–11 (3)	Javier Torres	TKO	2 (10)	April 24, 1935	Teatro Circo Olympia, Barcelona, Cataluña, Spain	
144	Win	115–15–11 (3)	Luigi Quadrini	PTS	10	April 12, 1935	Teatro Circo Price, Madrid, Comunidad de Madrid, Spain	
143	Loss	114–15–11 (3)	Baltasar Sangchili	PTS	10	March 18, 1935	Plaza de Toros, Valencia, Comunidad Valenciana, Spain	
142	Draw	114–14–11 (3)	Gustavo Ansini	PTS	10	March 9, 1935	Central Sporting Club, Paris, France	
141	Win	114–14–10 (3)	Henri Barras	PTS	10	March 2, 1935	Central Sporting Club, Paris, France	
140	Loss	113–14–10 (3)	Freddie Miller	UD	10	December 24, 1934	Palais des Sports, Lille, Nord, France	
139	Win	113–13–10 (3)	Frans Machtens	PTS	10	December 9, 1934	Palais des Sports, Lille, Nord, France	
138	Win	112–13–10 (3)	Victor Perez	KO	10 (15)	November 1, 1934	Parc du Belvedere, Tunis, Tunisia	Retained IBU and The Ring bantamweight titles
137	Loss	111–13–10 (3)	Johnny Edwards	UD	10	June 30, 1934	Stadion Letzigrund, Zurich, Switzerland	
136	Loss	111–12–10 (3)	Gustave Humery	DQ	6 (10)	May 17, 1934	Palais des Sports, Paris, France	DQ'd after three warnings for using illegal tactics. The crowd rioted, destroying the ring and beat Brown half to death.
135	Win	111–11–10 (3)	Kid Francis	PTS	10	April 16, 1934	Palais des Sports, Paris, France	
134	Win	110–11–10 (3)	Maurice Dubois	TKO	2 (10)	April 7, 1934	Palais des Expositions, Geneva, Switzerland	
133	Win	109–11–10 (3)	Victor Perez	UD	15	February 19, 1934	Palais des Sports, Paris, France	Retained NYSAC, NBA, IBU, and The Ring bantamweight titles
132	Win	108–11–10 (3)	Luigi Quadrini	PTS	10	December 8, 1933	Grand Casino, Oran, Algeria	
131	Win	107–11–10 (3)	Alfredo Magnolfi	PTS	10	November 12, 1933	Casablanca, Morocco	
130	Win	106–11–10 (3)	Georges LePerson	PTS	10	September 30, 1933	Stade Communal de Saint Eugène, Algiers, Algeria	
129	Win	105–11–10 (3)	Johnny King	PTS	15	July 3, 1933	King's Hall, Belle Vue, Manchester, Lancashire, England	Retained NYSAC, NBA, IBU, and The Ring bantamweight titles
128	Win	104–11–10 (3)	Dave Crowley	PTS	10	June 12, 1933	Olympia, Kensington, London, England	
127	Win	103–11–10 (3)	Dick Burke	TKO	12 (12)	May 13, 1933	Blundell Park (Grimsby Town FC), Cleethorpes, Lincolnshire, England	
126	Win	102–11–10 (3)	Arthur Boddington	RTD	3 (12)	May 7, 1933	Royton NSB, Royton, Lancashire, England	
125	Win	101–11–10 (3)	Tommy Hyams	KO	9 (15)	April 30, 1933	The Ring, Blackfriars Road, Southwark, London, England	
124	Win	100–11–10 (3)	Domenico Bernasconi	UD	12	March 19, 1933	Palazzo dello Sport (Pad. 3 Fiera), Milan, Lombardia, Italy	Retained NYSAC, NBA, IBU, and The Ring bantamweight titles
123	Win	99–11–10 (3)	Johnny Peters	PTS	15	March 5, 1933	The Ring, Blackfriars Road, Southwark, London, England	
122	Win	98–11–10 (3)	Henri Poutrain	PTS	10	February 9, 1933	Palais de la Mutualité, Paris, France	
121	Win	97–11–10 (3)	Frans Machtens	PTS	10	December 8, 1932	Palais de la Mutualité, Paris, France	
120	Draw	96–11–10 (3)	Henri Scillie	MD	10	December 3, 1932	Palais d'Ete, Brussels, Bruxelles-Capitale, Belgium	
119	Win	96–11–9 (3)	Dick Burke	PTS	12	December 1, 1932	Norfolk Road Drill Hall, Sheffield, Yorkshire, England	
118	Win	95–11–9 (3)	Émile Pladner	KO	2 (10)	November 14, 1932	Palais des Sports, Paris, France	
117	Win	94–11–9 (3)	Nicolas Petit Biquet	UD	10	October 23, 1932	Palais des Sports, Schaerbeek, Bruxelles-Capitale, Belgium	
116	Win	93–11–9 (3)	Frans Machtens	PTS	10	October 20, 1932	Rubenspaleis, Antwerpen, Antwerpen, Belgium	
115	Win	92–11–9 (3)	Mose Butch	UD	10	September 26, 1932	Motor Square Garden, Pittsburgh, Pennsylvania, U.S.	
114	Win	91–11–9 (3)	Émile Pladner	KO	1 (15)	September 19, 1932	Maple Leaf Gardens, Toronto, Ontario, Canada	Retained NYSAC, NBA, and The Ring bantamweight titles
113	Win	90–11–9 (3)	Roland LeCuyer	TKO	6 (10)	August 17, 1932	Forum, Montreal, Quebec, Canada	
112	Win	89–11–9 (3)	Kid Francis	SD	15	July 10, 1932	Arènes du Rond-Point du Prado, Marseille, Bouches-du-Rhône, France	Retained NYSAC, NBA, IBU, and The Ring bantamweight titles
111	Loss	88–11–9 (3)	Vittorio Tamagnini	UD	10	June 25, 1932	Palazzo dello Sport (Pad. 3 Fiera), Milan, Lombardia, Italy	
110	Win	88–10–9 (3)	Eugène Huat	PTS	10	June 18, 1932	Palais des Sports, Paris, France	
109	Draw	87–10–9 (3)	Nel Tarleton	PTS	15	June 13, 1932	Anfield Football Ground, Liverpool, Merseyside, England	
108	Win	87–10–8 (3)	Frans Machtens	PTS	10	May 31, 1932	Cirque d'Hiver, Paris, France	
107	Win	86–10–8 (3)	Luigi Quadrini	RTD	6 (15)	May 28, 1932	Ninian Park, Cardiff, Wales	
106	Win	85–10–8 (3)	Dominique Di Cea	PTS	10	May 18, 1932	Salle Wagram, Paris, France, U.S.	
105	Win	84–10–8 (3)	Golf Ball Bernard	PTS	10	March 14, 1932	New Bedford A.A., New Bedford, Massachusetts, U.S.	
104	Loss	83–10–8 (3)	Speedy Dado	UD	10	January 4, 1932	Olympic Auditorium, Los Angeles, California, U.S.	
103	Loss	83–9–8 (3)	Newsboy Brown	PTS	10	December 15, 1931	Olympic Auditorium, Los Angeles, California, U.S.	
102	Win	83–8–8 (3)	Art Chapdelaine	KO	7 (10)	November 18, 1931	Colisee de Quebec, Quebec City, Quebec, Canada	
101	Win	82–8–8 (3)	Eugène Huat	UD	15	October 27, 1931	Forum, Montreal, Quebec, Canada	Retained NYSAC, NBA, and The Ring bantamweight titles
100	Win	81–8–8 (3)	Ginger Jones	KO	9 (10)	September 21, 1931	Pavilion, Mountain Ash, Wales	
99	Win	80–8–8 (3)	Pete Sanstol	SD	15	August 25, 1931	Forum, Montreal, Quebec, Canada	Retained NYSAC and NBA bantamweight titles; Won vacant The Ring bantamweight title
98	Loss	79–8–8 (3)	Johnny Cuthbert	DQ	8 (15)	June 15, 1931	Olympia, Kensington, London, England	
97	Win	79–7–8 (3)	Teddy Baldock	TKO	12 (15)	May 21, 1931	Royal Albert Hall, Kensington, London, England	
96	Win	78–7–8 (3)	Julien Verbist	KO	8 (10)	April 30, 1931	Cirque d'Hiver, Paris, France	
95	Win	77–7–8 (3)	Roger Simende	KO	3 (10)	April 15, 1931	Cirque d'Hiver, Paris, France	
94	Win	76–7–8 (3)	Jack Garland	PTS	15	April 13, 1931	King's Hall, Belle Vue, Manchester, Lancashire, England	
93	Win	75–7–8 (3)	Douglas Parker	TKO	11 (15)	March 23, 1931	New St James Hall, Newcastle, Tyne and Wear, England	
92	Win	74–7–8 (3)	Billy Farrell	TKO	3 (15)	March 9, 1931	King's Hall, Belle Vue, Manchester, Lancashire, England	
91	Win	73–7–8 (3)	Nic Bensa	PTS	10	February 11, 1931	Salle Pleyel, Paris, France	
90	Win	72–7–8 (3)	Nic Bensa	PTS	10	November 8, 1930	Velodrome d'Hiver, Paris, France	
89	Draw	71–7–8 (3)	Jose Girones	PTS	10	October 22, 1930	Plaza de Toros Monumental, Barcelona, Cataluña, Spain	
88	Win	71–7–7 (3)	Eugène Huat	UD	15	October 4, 1930	Velodrome d'Hiver, Paris, France	Retained NYSAC and NBA; Won vacant IBU bantamweight titles
87	Win	70–7–7 (3)	Johnny Vacca	TKO	3 (10)	August 29, 1930	Newfield Park, Bridgeport, Connecticut, U.S.	
86	Win	69–7–7 (3)	Domenico Bernasconi	PTS	10	July 23, 1930	Ebbets Field, Brooklyn, New York City, New York, U.S.	
85	Win	68–7–7 (3)	Calvin Reed	KO	4 (10)	July 4, 1930	Maryland Ball Park, Baltimore, Maryland, U.S.	
84	Win	67–7–7 (3)	Mickey Doyle	PTS	10	June 24, 1930	Watres Armory, Scranton, Pennsylvania, U.S.	
83	Win	66–7–7 (3)	Benny Brostoff	TKO	2 (10)	June 18, 1930	Bayonne Stadium, Bayonne, New Jersey, U.S.	
82	Win	65–7–7 (3)	Johnny McCoy	TKO	6 (10)	June 16, 1930	Heywood Arena, West Springfield, Massachusetts, U.S.	
81	Win	64–7–7 (3)	Milton Cohen	KO	1 (10)	June 5, 1930	Lakewood Arena, Waterbury, Connecticut, U.S.	
80	Win	63–7–7 (3)	Al Gillette	KO	9 (?)	April 21, 1930	New Bedford, Massachusetts, U.S.	
79	Win	62–7–7 (3)	Andrea Ettore Esposito	DQ	7 (10)	April 15, 1930	Convention Hall, Toledo, Ohio, U.S.	
78	Draw	61–7–7 (3)	Tommy Paul	PTS	6	March 14, 1930	Broadway Auditorium, Buffalo, New York, U.S.	
77	Win	61–7–6 (3)	Johnny Canzoneri	PTS	10	February 18, 1930	Manhattan Auditorium, Allentown, Pennsylvania, U.S.	
76	Win	60–7–6 (3)	Johnny Erickson	DQ	4 (15)	February 8, 1930	Olympia Boxing Club, New York City, New York, U.S.	Retained NYSAC and NBA bantamweight titles
75	Win	59–7–6 (3)	Pinky Silverberg	PTS	10	January 25, 1930	Arena Polar, Havana, Cuba	
74	Win	58–7–6 (3)	Knud Larsen	PTS	12	August 28, 1929	Stadion, Copenhagen, Denmark	
73	Loss	57–7–6 (3)	Battling Battalino	PTS	10	July 26, 1929	Bulkeley Stadium, Hartford, Connecticut, U.S.	
72	Win	57–6–6 (3)	Vernon Cormier	KO	4 (12)	July 16, 1929	Exposition Building, Portland, Maine, U.S.	
71	Win	56–6–6 (3)	Vic Burrone	PTS	10	July 3, 1929	Newark, New Jersey, U.S.	
70	Win	55–6–6 (3)	Gregorio Vidal	UD	15	June 18, 1929	Queensboro Stadium, Long Island City, Queens, New York City, New York, U.S.	Won vacant NYSAC bantamweight title
69	Win	54–6–6 (3)	Joe Cadman	KO	3 (10)	April 9, 1929	Cirque de Paris, Paris, France	
68	Win	53–6–6 (3)	Domenico Bernasconi	PTS	10	March 23, 1929	Frontón Jai-Alai, Madrid, Comunidad de Madrid, Spain	
67	Win	52–6–6 (3)	Gustave Humery	KO	1 (12)	January 29, 1929	Cirque de Paris, Paris, France	
66	Win	51–6–6 (3)	Harry Corbett	PTS	12	December 18, 1928	Cirque de Paris, Paris, France	
65	Draw	50–6–6 (3)	Johnny Cuthbert	PTS	12	November 17, 1928	Velodrome d'Hiver, Paris, France	
64	Win	50–6–5 (3)	Kid Francis	PTS	12	September 13, 1928	Madison Square Garden, New York City, New York, U.S.	
63	Win	49–6–5 (3)	Billy Shaw	KO	1 (8)	June 21, 1928	Madison Square Garden, New York City, New York, U.S.	
62	Win	48–6–5 (3)	Eddie O'Dowd	NWS	10	April 27, 1928	Armory, Toledo, Ohio, U.S.	
61	Win	48–6–5 (2)	Steve Nugent	DQ	2 (10)	April 10, 1928	Armory, Toledo, Ohio, U.S.	Low blow
60	Win	47–6–5 (2)	Benny Schwartz	PTS	10	March 23, 1928	Madison Square Garden, New York City, New York, U.S.	
59	Loss	46–6–5 (2)	André Routis	PTS	10	December 10, 1927	Velodrome d'Hiver, Paris, France	
58	Loss	46–5–5 (2)	Henri Scillie	PTS	13	November 22, 1927	Cirque d'Hiver, Paris, France	
57	Win	46–4–5 (2)	Albert Ryall	KO	2 (?)	October 18, 1927	Cirque d'Hiver, Paris, France	
56	Win	45–4–5 (2)	Young Ciclone	PTS	10	May 10, 1927	Cirque de Paris, Paris, France	
55	Win	44–4–5 (2)	Eugène Criqui	UD	10	April 2, 1927	Velodrome d'Hiver, Paris, France	
54	Win	43–4–5 (2)	George Joseph Stockings	KO	5 (10)	March 8, 1927	Cirque de Paris, Paris, France	
53	Win	42–4–5 (2)	Edouard Mascart	TKO	5 (?)	January 25, 1927	Cirque de Paris, Paris, France	
52	Draw	41–4–5 (2)	Henri Scillie	PTS	12	December 14, 1926	Cirque de Paris, Paris, France	
51	Win	41–4–4 (2)	Roger Fabregues	KO	1 (10)	December 1, 1926	Salle Wagram, Paris, France	
50	Win	40–4–4 (2)	Antoine Merlo	KO	3 (10)	November 10, 1926	Salle Wagram, Paris, France	
49	Win	39–4–4 (2)	Joe Ryder	DQ	4 (10)	September 2, 1926	Madison Square Garden, New York City, New York, U.S.	
48	Win	38–4–4 (2)	Harry Forbes	PTS	12	August 5, 1926	Albany, New York, U.S.	Not to be confused with Harry Forbes
47	Win	37–4–4 (2)	Peter Zivic	PTS	10	July 8, 1926	Madison Square Garden, New York City, New York, U.S.	
46	Win	36–4–4 (2)	Billy Marlowe	KO	4 (10)	June 26, 1926	Commonwealth Sporting Club, New York City, New York, U.S.	
45	Win	35–4–4 (2)	Jacques Pettibon	KO	4 (10)	June 5, 1926	Commonwealth Sporting Club, New York City, New York, U.S.	
44	Win	34–4–4 (2)	Teddy Silva	KO	3 (10)	May 21, 1926	Madison Square Garden, New York City, New York, U.S.	
43	Loss	33–4–4 (2)	Abe Goldstein	PTS	6	April 23, 1926	Pioneer Sporting Club, New York City, New York, U.S.	
42	Draw	33–3–4 (2)	Willie O'Connell	PTS	6	April 10, 1926	Ridgewood Grove, Brooklyn, New York City, New York, U.S.	
41	Win	33–3–3 (2)	Eddie O'Dowd	PTS	12	March 20, 1926	Commonwealth Sporting Club, New York City, New York, U.S.	
40	Loss	32–3–3 (2)	Dominick Petrone	PTS	10	February 6, 1926	Commonwealth Sporting Club, New York City, New York, U.S.	
39	Win	32–2–3 (2)	Tommy Hughes	PTS	10	December 12, 1925	Commonwealth Sporting Club, New York City, New York, U.S.	
38	Win	31–2–3 (2)	Marty Gold	UD	10	November 14, 1925	Commonwealth Sporting Club, New York City, New York, U.S.	
37	Win	30–2–3 (2)	Johnny Breslin	PTS	10	October 16, 1925	Pioneer Sporting Club, New York City, New York, U.S.	
36	Win	29–2–3 (2)	Bobby Green	PTS	10	October 3, 1925	Commonwealth Sporting Club, New York City, New York, U.S.	
35	Win	28–2–3 (2)	Joey Ross	NWS	10	September 21, 1925	Oakland A.A., Jersey City, New Jersey, U.S.	
34	Win	28–2–3 (1)	Davey Adelman	PTS	10	September 9, 1925	Atlantic City, New Jersey, U.S.	
33	Win	27–2–3 (1)	Eddie Flank	PTS	10	August 22, 1925	Commonwealth Sporting Club, New York City, New York, U.S.	
32	Win	26–2–3 (1)	Dominick Petrone	PTS	10	June 27, 1925	Commonwealth Sporting Club, New York City, New York, U.S.	
31	Loss	25–2–3 (1)	Frankie Murray	DQ	1 (10)	June 11, 1925	Bacharach Ball Park, Atlantic City, New Jersey, U.S.	
30	Win	25–1–3 (1)	Dominick Petrone	PTS	6	May 16, 1925	Commonwealth Sporting Club, New York City, New York, U.S.	
29	Win	24–1–3 (1)	Davey Abad	UD	6	February 19, 1925	Clermont Avenue Rink, Brooklyn, New York City, New York, U.S.	
28	Win	23–1–3 (1)	Terry Miller	PTS	10	February 7, 1925	Commonwealth Sporting Club, New York City, New York, U.S.	
27	Win	22–1–3 (1)	Jimmy Russo	PTS	10	January 3, 1925	Commonwealth Sporting Club, New York City, New York, U.S.	
26	Loss	21–1–3 (1)	Jimmy Russo	PTS	10	December 6, 1924	Commonwealth Sporting Club, New York City, New York, U.S.	
25	Win	21–0–3 (1)	Tommy Milton	PTS	15	November 11, 1924	Pioneer Sporting Club, New York City, New York, U.S.	
24	Win	20–0–3 (1)	Frankie Ash	KO	1 (12)	October 25, 1924	Commonwealth Sporting Club, New York City, New York, U.S.	
23	Win	19–0–3 (1)	Billy Marlowe	PTS	10	September 27, 1924	Commonwealth Sporting Club, New York City, New York, U.S.	
22	Win	18–0–3 (1)	Jimmy Moreno	KO	1 (10)	September 13, 1924	Commonwealth Sporting Club, New York City, New York, U.S.	
21	Win	17–0–3 (1)	Joey Russell	PTS	10	August 30, 1924	Commonwealth Sporting Club, New York City, New York, U.S.	
20	Win	16–0–3 (1)	George McNally	TKO	4 (10)	August 9, 1924	Commonwealth Sporting Club, New York City, New York, U.S.	
19	Win	15–0–3 (1)	Allie Kaufmann	KO	1 (?)	June 28, 1924	Commonwealth Sporting Club, New York City, New York, U.S.	
18	Win	14–0–3 (1)	Willie LaMorte	KO	2 (12)	June 7, 1924	Commonwealth Sporting Club, New York City, New York, U.S.	
17	Win	13–0–3 (1)	Joe Colletti	PTS	12	May 24, 1924	Commonwealth Sporting Club, New York City, New York, U.S.	
16	Win	12–0–3 (1)	Bobby Burns	KO	7 (12)	May 3, 1924	Commonwealth Sporting Club, New York City, New York, U.S.	
15	Win	11–0–3 (1)	Willie Farley	KO	1 (10)	April 12, 1924	Commonwealth Sporting Club, New York City, New York, U.S.	
14	Loss	10–0–3 (1)	Willie LaMorte	NWS	8	December 17, 1923	Arena, Trenton, New Jersey, U.S.	
13	Win	10–0–3	Willie Darcy	PTS	12	December 12, 1923	Commonwealth Sporting Club, New York City, New York, U.S.	
12	Win	9–0–3	Bernie Hyams	KO	3 (6)	October 13, 1923	Commonwealth Sporting Club, New York City, New York, U.S.	
11	Draw	8–0–3	Bobby Risden	PTS	6	October 6, 1923	Commonwealth Sporting Club, New York City, New York, U.S.	
10	Win	8–0–2	Tommy Martin	TKO	1 (6)	September 22, 1923	Commonwealth Sporting Club, New York City, New York, U.S.	
9	Draw	7–0–2	Johnny Breslin	PTS	4	August 22, 1923	Velodrome, New York City, New York, U.S.	
8	Win	7–0–1	Pedro Troncoso	PTS	6	February 11, 1923	Central American Stadium, Colon, Panama	
7	Draw	6–0–1	Sailor Patchett	PTS	15	December 9, 1922	Central American Stadium, Colon, Panama	For vacant Panamanian flyweight title
6	Win	6–0	Young Jeff Clark	TKO	6 (10)	October 7, 1922	Colon Stadium, Colon, Panama	
5	Win	5–0	Kid Pelkey	TKO	4 (8)	September 9, 1922	Excelsior Theater, Panama City, Panama	
4	Win	4–0	Ernie Rijfkogel	KO	4 (10)	July 29, 1922	American Theater, Colon, Panama	
3	Win	3–0	Battling Miller	TKO	5 (8)	May 21, 1922	Colon City, Panama	
2	Win	2–0	Montalbo Kid	KO	2 (6)	April 22, 1922	Colon City, Panama	
1	Win	1–0	Jose Moreno	PTS	6	March 19, 1922	Colon City, Panama	

=== Unofficial record ===
163 fights	131 wins	20 losses
By knockout	59	0
By decision	68	17
By disqualification	4	3
Draws	12	

Record with the inclusion of Newspaper decisions in the win/loss/draw column.

No.	Result	Record	Opponent	Type	Round	Date	Location	Notes
163	Win	131–20–12	Kid Fortune	PTS	10	December 4, 1943	Club Tropical, Colon City, Panama	
162	Draw	130–20–12	Leocadio Torres	PTS	10	August 30, 1942	Estadio Olimpico, Panama City, Panama	For vacant Panamanian featherweight title
161	Loss	130–20–11	Eduardo Carrasco	PTS	10	March 8, 1942	Estadio Olimpico, Panama City, Panama	
160	Loss	130–19–11	Eduardo Carrasco	PTS	10	October 26, 1941	Gimnasio Nacional, Panama City, Panama	
159	Win	130–18–11	Kid Fortune	KO	2 (10)	September 7, 1941	Gimnasio Nacional, Panama City, Panama	
158	Win	129–18–11	Battling Nelson	KO	4 (10)	July 26, 1941	Gimnasio Nacional, Panama City, Panama	
157	Win	128–18–11	Leocadio Torres	KO	8 (10)	July 14, 1941	Gimnasio Nacional, Panama City, Panama	
156	Win	127–18–11	Mariano Arilla	KO	3 (8)	May 6, 1939	Rockland Palace, New York City, New York, U.S.	
155	Win	126–18–11	Cristobal Jaramillo	TKO	4 (10)	April 22, 1939	Rockland Palace, New York City, New York, U.S.	
154	Win	125–18–11	Valentin Angelmann	KO	8 (10)	April 13, 1938	Palais des Sports, Paris, France	
153	Win	124–18–11	Baltasar Sangchili	SD	15	March 4, 1938	Palais des Sports, Paris, France	Won vacant IBU bantamweight title
152	Win	123–18–11	Victor Perez	KO	5 (10)	December 22, 1937	Salle Wagram, Paris, France	
151	Win	122–18–11	Joseph Decico	PTS	10	November 26, 1937	Salle Wagram, Paris, France	
150	Win	121–18–11	Francis Augier	KO	2 (10)	October 8, 1937	Salle Communale de Plainpalais, Geneva, Switzerland	
149	Win	120–18–11	Maurice Huguenin	KO	3 (10)	September 23, 1937	Salle Wagram, Paris, France	
148	Win	119–18–11	Andre Regis	KO	1 (15)	September 9, 1937	Salle Wagram, Paris, France	
147	Loss	118–18–11	Pete Sanstol	UD	10	September 13, 1935	Bislet Stadium, Oslo, Norway	
146	Loss	118–17–11	Baltasar Sangchili	PTS	15	June 1, 1935	Plaza de Toros, Valencia, Comunidad Valenciana, Spain	Lost The Ring bantamweight title
145	Win	118–16–11	Javier Torres	TKO	2 (10)	April 24, 1935	Teatro Circo Olympia, Barcelona, Cataluña, Spain	
144	Win	117–16–11	Luigi Quadrini	PTS	10	April 12, 1935	Teatro Circo Price, Madrid, Comunidad de Madrid, Spain	
143	Loss	116–16–11	Baltasar Sangchili	PTS	10	March 18, 1935	Plaza de Toros, Valencia, Comunidad Valenciana, Spain	
142	Draw	116–15–11	Gustavo Ansini	PTS	10	March 9, 1935	Central Sporting Club, Paris, France	
141	Win	116–15–10	Henri Barras	PTS	10	March 2, 1935	Central Sporting Club, Paris, France	
140	Loss	115–15–10	Freddie Miller	UD	10	December 24, 1934	Palais des Sports, Lille, Nord, France	
139	Win	115–14–10	Frans Machtens	PTS	10	December 9, 1934	Palais des Sports, Lille, Nord, France	
138	Win	114–14–10	Victor Perez	KO	10 (15)	November 1, 1934	Parc du Belvedere, Tunis, Tunisia	Retained IBU and The Ring bantamweight titles
137	Loss	113–14–10	Johnny Edwards	UD	10	June 30, 1934	Stadion Letzigrund, Zurich, Switzerland	
136	Loss	113–13–10	Gustave Humery	DQ	6 (10)	May 17, 1934	Palais des Sports, Paris, France	DQ'd after three warnings for using illegal tactics. The crowd rioted, destroying the ring and nearly killing Brown
135	Win	113–12–10	Kid Francis	PTS	10	April 16, 1934	Palais des Sports, Paris, France	
134	Win	112–12–10	Maurice Dubois	TKO	2 (10)	April 7, 1934	Palais des Expositions, Geneva, Switzerland	
133	Win	111–12–10	Victor Perez	UD	15	February 19, 1934	Palais des Sports, Paris, France	Retained NYSAC, NBA, IBU, and The Ring bantamweight titles
132	Win	110–12–10	Luigi Quadrini	PTS	10	December 8, 1933	Grand Casino, Oran, Algeria	
131	Win	109–12–10	Alfredo Magnolfi	PTS	10	November 12, 1933	Casablanca, Morocco	
130	Win	108–12–10	Georges LePerson	PTS	10	September 30, 1933	Stade Communal de Saint Eugène, Algiers, Algeria	
129	Win	107–12–10	Johnny King	PTS	15	July 3, 1933	King's Hall, Belle Vue, Manchester, Lancashire, England	Retained NYSAC, NBA, IBU, and The Ring bantamweight titles
128	Win	106–12–10	Dave Crowley	PTS	10	June 12, 1933	Olympia, Kensington, London, England	
127	Win	105–12–10	Dick Burke	TKO	12 (12)	May 13, 1933	Blundell Park (Grimsby Town FC), Cleethorpes, Lincolnshire, England	
126	Win	104–12–10	Arthur Boddington	RTD	3 (12)	May 7, 1933	Royton NSB, Royton, Lancashire, England	
125	Win	103–12–10	Tommy Hyams	KO	9 (15)	April 30, 1933	The Ring, Blackfriars Road, Southwark, London, England	
124	Win	102–12–10	Domenico Bernasconi	UD	12	March 19, 1933	Palazzo dello Sport (Pad. 3 Fiera), Milan, Lombardia, Italy	Retained NYSAC, NBA, IBU, and The Ring bantamweight titles
123	Win	101–12–10	Johnny Peters	PTS	15	March 5, 1933	The Ring, Blackfriars Road, Southwark, London, England	
122	Win	100–12–10	Henri Poutrain	PTS	10	February 9, 1933	Palais de la Mutualité, Paris, France	
121	Win	99–12–10	Frans Machtens	PTS	10	December 8, 1932	Palais de la Mutualité, Paris, France	
120	Draw	98–12–10	Henri Scillie	MD	10	December 3, 1932	Palais d'Ete, Brussels, Bruxelles-Capitale, Belgium	
119	Win	98–12–9	Dick Burke	PTS	12	December 1, 1932	Norfolk Road Drill Hall, Sheffield, Yorkshire, England	
118	Win	97–12–9	Émile Pladner	KO	2 (10)	November 14, 1932	Palais des Sports, Paris, France	
117	Win	96–12–9	Nicolas Petit Biquet	UD	10	October 23, 1932	Palais des Sports, Schaerbeek, Bruxelles-Capitale, Belgium	
116	Win	95–12–9	Frans Machtens	PTS	10	October 20, 1932	Rubenspaleis, Antwerpen, Antwerpen, Belgium	
115	Win	94–12–9	Mose Butch	UD	10	September 26, 1932	Motor Square Garden, Pittsburgh, Pennsylvania, U.S.	
114	Win	93–12–9	Émile Pladner	KO	1 (15)	September 19, 1932	Maple Leaf Gardens, Toronto, Ontario, Canada	Retained NYSAC, NBA, and The Ring bantamweight titles
113	Win	92–12–9	Roland LeCuyer	TKO	6 (10)	August 17, 1932	Forum, Montreal, Quebec, Canada	
112	Win	91–12–9	Kid Francis	SD	15	July 10, 1932	Arènes du Rond-Point du Prado, Marseille, Bouches-du-Rhône, France	Retained NYSAC, NBA, IBU, and The Ring bantamweight titles
111	Loss	90–12–9	Vittorio Tamagnini	UD	10	June 25, 1932	Palazzo dello Sport (Pad. 3 Fiera), Milan, Lombardia, Italy	
110	Win	90–11–9	Eugène Huat	PTS	10	June 18, 1932	Palais des Sports, Paris, France	
109	Draw	89–11–9	Nel Tarleton	PTS	15	June 13, 1932	Anfield Football Ground, Liverpool, Merseyside, England	
108	Win	89–11–8	Frans Machtens	PTS	10	May 31, 1932	Cirque d'Hiver, Paris, France	
107	Win	88–11–8	Luigi Quadrini	RTD	6 (15)	May 28, 1932	Ninian Park, Cardiff, Wales	
106	Win	87–11–8	Dominique Di Cea	PTS	10	May 18, 1932	Salle Wagram, Paris, France, U.S.	
105	Win	86–11–8	Golf Ball Bernard	PTS	10	March 14, 1932	New Bedford A.A., New Bedford, Massachusetts, U.S.	
104	Loss	85–11–8	Speedy Dado	UD	10	January 4, 1932	Olympic Auditorium, Los Angeles, California, U.S.	
103	Loss	85–10–8	Newsboy Brown	PTS	10	December 15, 1931	Olympic Auditorium, Los Angeles, California, U.S.	
102	Win	85–9–8	Art Chapdelaine	KO	7 (10)	November 18, 1931	Colisee de Quebec, Quebec City, Quebec, Canada	
101	Win	84–9–8	Eugène Huat	UD	15	October 27, 1931	Forum, Montreal, Quebec, Canada	Retained NYSAC, NBA, and The Ring bantamweight titles
100	Win	83–9–8	Ginger Jones	KO	9 (10)	September 21, 1931	Pavilion, Mountain Ash, Wales	
99	Win	82–9–8	Pete Sanstol	SD	15	August 25, 1931	Forum, Montreal, Quebec, Canada	Retained NYSAC, NBA bantamweight titles; Won vacant The Ring bantamweight title
98	Loss	81–9–8	Johnny Cuthbert	DQ	8 (15)	June 15, 1931	Olympia, Kensington, London, England	
97	Win	81–8–8	Teddy Baldock	TKO	12 (15)	May 21, 1931	Royal Albert Hall, Kensington, London, England	
96	Win	80–8–8	Julien Verbist	KO	8 (10)	April 30, 1931	Cirque d'Hiver, Paris, France	
95	Win	79–8–8	Roger Simende	KO	3 (10)	April 15, 1931	Cirque d'Hiver, Paris, France	
94	Win	78–8–8	Jack Garland	PTS	15	April 13, 1931	King's Hall, Belle Vue, Manchester, Lancashire, England	
93	Win	77–8–8	Douglas Parker	TKO	11 (15)	March 23, 1931	New St James Hall, Newcastle, Tyne and Wear, England	
92	Win	76–8–8	Billy Farrell	TKO	3 (15)	March 9, 1931	King's Hall, Belle Vue, Manchester, Lancashire, England	
91	Win	75–8–8	Nic Bensa	PTS	10	February 11, 1931	Salle Pleyel, Paris, France	
90	Win	74–8–8	Nic Bensa	PTS	10	November 8, 1930	Velodrome d'Hiver, Paris, France	
89	Draw	73–8–8	Jose Girones	PTS	10	October 22, 1930	Plaza de Toros Monumental, Barcelona, Cataluña, Spain	
88	Win	73–8–7	Eugène Huat	UD	15	October 4, 1930	Velodrome d'Hiver, Paris, France	Retained NYSAC bantamweight titles; Won vacant NBA and IBU bantamweight titles
87	Win	72–8–7	Johnny Vacca	TKO	3 (10)	August 29, 1930	Newfield Park, Bridgeport, Connecticut, U.S.	
86	Win	71–8–7	Domenico Bernasconi	PTS	10	July 23, 1930	Ebbets Field, Brooklyn, New York City, New York, U.S.	
85	Win	70–8–7	Calvin Reed	KO	4 (10)	July 4, 1930	Maryland Ball Park, Baltimore, Maryland, U.S.	
84	Win	69–8–7	Mickey Doyle	PTS	10	June 24, 1930	Watres Armory, Scranton, Pennsylvania, U.S.	
83	Win	68–8–7	Benny Brostoff	TKO	2 (10)	June 18, 1930	Bayonne Stadium, Bayonne, New Jersey, U.S.	
82	Win	67–8–7	Johnny McCoy	TKO	6 (10)	June 16, 1930	Heywood Arena, West Springfield, Massachusetts, U.S.	
81	Win	66–8–7	Milton Cohen	KO	1 (10)	June 5, 1930	Lakewood Arena, Waterbury, Connecticut, U.S.	
80	Win	65–8–7	Al Gillette	KO	9 (?)	April 21, 1930	New Bedford, Massachusetts, U.S.	
79	Win	64–8–7	Andrea Ettore Esposito	DQ	7 (10)	April 15, 1930	Convention Hall, Toledo, Ohio, U.S.	
78	Draw	63–8–7	Tommy Paul	PTS	6	March 14, 1930	Broadway Auditorium, Buffalo, New York, U.S.	
77	Win	63–8–6	Johnny Canzoneri	PTS	10	February 18, 1930	Manhattan Auditorium, Allentown, Pennsylvania, U.S.	
76	Win	62–8–6	Johnny Erickson	DQ	4 (15)	February 8, 1930	Olympia Boxing Club, New York City, New York, U.S.	Retained NYSAC bantamweight title
75	Win	61–8–6	Pinky Silverberg	PTS	10	January 25, 1930	Arena Polar, Havana, Cuba	
74	Win	60–8–6	Knud Larsen	PTS	12	August 28, 1929	Stadion, Copenhagen, Denmark	
73	Loss	59–8–6	Battling Battalino	PTS	10	July 26, 1929	Bulkeley Stadium, Hartford, Connecticut, U.S.	
72	Win	59–7–6	Vernon Cormier	KO	4 (12)	July 16, 1929	Exposition Building, Portland, Maine, U.S.	
71	Win	58–7–6	Vic Burrone	PTS	10	July 3, 1929	Newark, New Jersey, U.S.	
70	Win	57–7–6	Gregorio Vidal	UD	15	June 18, 1929	Queensboro Stadium, Long Island City, Queens, New York City, New York, U.S.	Won vacant NYSAC bantamweight title
69	Win	56–7–6	Joe Cadman	KO	3 (10)	April 9, 1929	Cirque de Paris, Paris, France	
68	Win	55–7–6	Domenico Bernasconi	PTS	10	March 23, 1929	Frontón Jai-Alai, Madrid, Comunidad de Madrid, Spain	
67	Win	54–7–6	Gustave Humery	KO	1 (12)	January 29, 1929	Cirque de Paris, Paris, France	
66	Win	53–7–6	Harry Corbett	PTS	12	December 18, 1928	Cirque de Paris, Paris, France	
65	Draw	52–7–6	Johnny Cuthbert	PTS	12	November 17, 1928	Velodrome d'Hiver, Paris, France	
64	Win	52–7–5	Kid Francis	PTS	12	September 13, 1928	Madison Square Garden, New York City, New York, U.S.	
63	Win	51–7–5	Billy Shaw	KO	1 (8)	June 21, 1928	Madison Square Garden, New York City, New York, U.S.	
62	Win	50–7–5	Eddie O'Dowd	NWS	10	April 27, 1928	Armory, Toledo, Ohio, U.S.	
61	Win	49–7–5	Steve Nugent	DQ	2 (10)	April 10, 1928	Armory, Toledo, Ohio, U.S.	Low blow
60	Win	48–7–5	Benny Schwartz	PTS	10	March 23, 1928	Madison Square Garden, New York City, New York, U.S.	
59	Loss	47–7–5	André Routis	PTS	10	December 10, 1927	Velodrome d'Hiver, Paris, France	
58	Loss	47–6–5	Henri Scillie	PTS	13	November 22, 1927	Cirque d'Hiver, Paris, France	
57	Win	47–5–5	Albert Ryall	KO	2 (?)	October 18, 1927	Cirque d'Hiver, Paris, France	
56	Win	46–5–5	Young Ciclone	PTS	10	May 10, 1927	Cirque de Paris, Paris, France	
55	Win	45–5–5	Eugène Criqui	UD	10	April 2, 1927	Velodrome d'Hiver, Paris, France	
54	Win	44–5–5	George Joseph Stockings	KO	5 (10)	March 8, 1927	Cirque de Paris, Paris, France	
53	Win	43–5–5	Edouard Mascart	TKO	5 (?)	January 25, 1927	Cirque de Paris, Paris, France	
52	Draw	42–5–5	Henri Scillie	PTS	12	December 14, 1926	Cirque de Paris, Paris, France	
51	Win	42–5–4	Roger Fabregues	KO	1 (10)	December 1, 1926	Salle Wagram, Paris, France	
50	Win	41–5–4	Antoine Merlo	KO	3 (10)	November 10, 1926	Salle Wagram, Paris, France	
49	Win	40–5–4	Joe Ryder	DQ	4 (10)	September 2, 1926	Madison Square Garden, New York City, New York, U.S.	
48	Win	39–5–4	Harry Forbes	PTS	12	August 5, 1926	Albany, New York, U.S.	Not to be confused with Harry Forbes
47	Win	38–5–4	Peter Zivic	PTS	10	July 8, 1926	Madison Square Garden, New York City, New York, U.S.	
46	Win	37–5–4	Billy Marlowe	KO	4 (10)	June 26, 1926	Commonwealth Sporting Club, New York City, New York, U.S.	
45	Win	36–5–4	Jacques Pettibon	KO	4 (10)	June 5, 1926	Commonwealth Sporting Club, New York City, New York, U.S.	
44	Win	35–5–4	Teddy Silva	KO	3 (10)	May 21, 1926	Madison Square Garden, New York City, New York, U.S.	
43	Loss	34–5–4	Abe Goldstein	PTS	6	April 23, 1926	Pioneer Sporting Club, New York City, New York, U.S.	
42	Draw	34–4–4	Willie O'Connell	PTS	6	April 10, 1926	Ridgewood Grove, Brooklyn, New York City, New York, U.S.	
41	Win	34–4–3	Eddie O'Dowd	PTS	12	March 20, 1926	Commonwealth Sporting Club, New York City, New York, U.S.	
40	Loss	33–4–3	Dominick Petrone	PTS	10	February 6, 1926	Commonwealth Sporting Club, New York City, New York, U.S.	
39	Win	33–3–3	Tommy Hughes	PTS	10	December 12, 1925	Commonwealth Sporting Club, New York City, New York, U.S.	
38	Win	32–3–3	Marty Gold	UD	10	November 14, 1925	Commonwealth Sporting Club, New York City, New York, U.S.	
37	Win	31–3–3	Johnny Breslin	PTS	10	October 16, 1925	Pioneer Sporting Club, New York City, New York, U.S.	
36	Win	30–3–3	Bobby Green	PTS	10	October 3, 1925	Commonwealth Sporting Club, New York City, New York, U.S.	
35	Win	29–3–3	Joey Ross	NWS	10	September 21, 1925	Oakland A.A., Jersey City, New Jersey, U.S.	
34	Win	28–3–3	Davey Adelman	PTS	10	September 9, 1925	Atlantic City, New Jersey, U.S.	
33	Win	27–3–3	Eddie Flank	PTS	10	August 22, 1925	Commonwealth Sporting Club, New York City, New York, U.S.	
32	Win	26–3–3	Dominick Petrone	PTS	10	June 27, 1925	Commonwealth Sporting Club, New York City, New York, U.S.	
31	Loss	25–3–3	Frankie Murray	DQ	1 (10)	June 11, 1925	Bacharach Ball Park, Atlantic City, New Jersey, U.S.	
30	Win	25–2–3	Dominick Petrone	PTS	6	May 16, 1925	Commonwealth Sporting Club, New York City, New York, U.S.	
29	Win	24–2–3	Davey Abad	UD	6	February 19, 1925	Clermont Avenue Rink, Brooklyn, New York City, New York, U.S.	
28	Win	23–2–3	Terry Miller	PTS	10	February 7, 1925	Commonwealth Sporting Club, New York City, New York, U.S.	
27	Win	22–2–3	Jimmy Russo	PTS	10	January 3, 1925	Commonwealth Sporting Club, New York City, New York, U.S.	
26	Loss	21–2–3	Jimmy Russo	PTS	10	December 6, 1924	Commonwealth Sporting Club, New York City, New York, U.S.	
25	Win	21–1–3	Tommy Milton	PTS	15	November 11, 1924	Pioneer Sporting Club, New York City, New York, U.S.	
24	Win	20–1–3	Frankie Ash	KO	1 (12)	October 25, 1924	Commonwealth Sporting Club, New York City, New York, U.S.	
23	Win	19–1–3	Billy Marlowe	PTS	10	September 27, 1924	Commonwealth Sporting Club, New York City, New York, U.S.	
22	Win	18–1–3	Jimmy Moreno	KO	1 (10)	September 13, 1924	Commonwealth Sporting Club, New York City, New York, U.S.	
21	Win	17–1–3	Joey Russell	PTS	10	August 30, 1924	Commonwealth Sporting Club, New York City, New York, U.S.	
20	Win	16–1–3	George McNally	TKO	4 (10)	August 9, 1924	Commonwealth Sporting Club, New York City, New York, U.S.	
19	Win	15–1–3	Allie Kaufmann	KO	1 (?)	June 28, 1924	Commonwealth Sporting Club, New York City, New York, U.S.	
18	Win	14–1–3	Willie LaMorte	KO	2 (12)	June 7, 1924	Commonwealth Sporting Club, New York City, New York, U.S.	
17	Win	13–1–3	Joe Colletti	PTS	12	May 24, 1924	Commonwealth Sporting Club, New York City, New York, U.S.	
16	Win	12–1–3	Bobby Burns	KO	7 (12)	May 3, 1924	Commonwealth Sporting Club, New York City, New York, U.S.	
15	Win	11–1–3	Willie Farley	KO	1 (10)	April 12, 1924	Commonwealth Sporting Club, New York City, New York, U.S.	
14	Loss	10–1–3	Willie LaMorte	NWS	8	December 17, 1923	Arena, Trenton, New Jersey, U.S.	
13	Win	10–0–3	Willie Darcy	PTS	12	December 12, 1923	Commonwealth Sporting Club, New York City, New York, U.S.	
12	Win	9–0–3	Bernie Hyams	KO	3 (6)	October 13, 1923	Commonwealth Sporting Club, New York City, New York, U.S.	
11	Draw	8–0–3	Bobby Risden	PTS	6	October 6, 1923	Commonwealth Sporting Club, New York City, New York, U.S.	
10	Win	8–0–2	Tommy Martin	TKO	1 (6)	September 22, 1923	Commonwealth Sporting Club, New York City, New York, U.S.	
9	Draw	7–0–2	Johnny Breslin	PTS	4	August 22, 1923	Velodrome, New York City, New York, U.S.	
8	Win	7–0–1	Pedro Troncoso	PTS	6	February 11, 1923	Central American Stadium, Colon, Panama	
7	Draw	6–0–1	Sailor Patchett	PTS	15	December 9, 1922	Central American Stadium, Colon, Panama	For vacant Panamanian flyweight title
6	Win	6–0	Young Jeff Clark	TKO	6 (10)	October 7, 1922	Colon Stadium, Colon, Panama	
5	Win	5–0	Kid Pelkey	TKO	4 (8)	September 9, 1922	Excelsior Theater, Panama City, Panama	
4	Win	4–0	Ernie Rijfkogel	KO	4 (10)	July 29, 1922	American Theater, Colon, Panama	
3	Win	3–0	Battling Miller	TKO	5 (8)	May 21, 1922	Colon City, Panama	
2	Win	2–0	Montalbo Kid	KO	2 (6)	April 22, 1922	Colon City, Panama	
1	Win	1–0	Jose Moreno	PTS	6	March 19, 1922	Colon City, Panama	

== Titles in boxing ==
=== Major world titles ===
- NYSAC bantamweight champion (118 lbs)
- NBA (WBA) bantamweight champion (118 lbs) (2×) (Note: Brown was awarded the title on October 8, 1929, and was stripped February 3, 1930. He was subsequently awarded the title again on October 4, 1930.)

=== The Ring magazine titles ===
- The Ring bantamweight champion (118 lbs)

=== Regional/International titles ===
- European bantamweight champion (118 lbs) (2×)

=== Undisputed titles ===
- Undisputed bantamweight champion (2×)

== See also ==
- List of bantamweight boxing champions

== Bibliography ==
- Friedman, Ian (2007). Latino Athletes. Infobase Publishing. ISBN 978-0-8160-6384-0.
- Stovall, Tyler (1996). Paris noir: African Americans in the City of Light. Houghton Mifflin. ISBN 1469909065.
- Arnaud, Claude (2003). Jean Cocteau: A Life. Yale University Press. ISBN 978-0-300-17057-3.

Sporting positions
Minor world boxing titles
Vacant Title last held by Tony Marino	IBU bantamweight champion March 4, 1938 – April 13, 1938; Vacated	Title discontinued
Major world boxing titles
Vacant Title last held by Bushy Graham	NYSAC bantamweight champion June 18, 1929 – March 27, 1934; Stripped	Succeeded by Lou Salica
Vacant Title last held by Charlie Phil Rosenberg	Lineal bantamweight champion June 18, 1929 – June 1, 1935	Succeeded by Baltasar Sangchili
Preceded by Bushy Graham	NBA bantamweight champion October 8, 1929 – February 3, 1930; Stripped	Succeeded by Panama Al Brown
Preceded by Panama Al Brown	NBA bantamweight champion October 4, 1930 – September 18, 1934; Stripped	Succeeded by Sixto Escobar
Preceded by Eugène Huat	IBU bantamweight champion October 4, 1930 – June 1, 1935	Next: Baltasar Sangchili
Preceded by Bushy Graham	The Ring bantamweight champion August 25, 1931 – June 1, 1935	Next: Baltasar Sangchili
