= Johnny King (boxer) =

English boxer

Personal information
- Nationality: English
- Born: 8 January 1912 Manchester, England
- Died: 6 March 1963 (aged 51)
- Weight: Flyweight, Bantamweight, Featherweight, Lightweight

Boxing career
- Stance: Orthodox

Boxing record
- Total fights: 228
- Wins: 162
- Win by KO: 74
- Losses: 50
- Draws: 15
- No contests: 1

Johnny King (8 January 1912 – 6 March 1963) was an English professional boxer who competed from 1926 to 1947. Predominantly a bantamweight, he was a two-time British bantamweight champion and a one-time British Empire (Commonwealth) bantamweight champion. His professional fighting weight varied from 84 lb (38 kg; 6 st 0 lb), flyweight, to 130 lb (59 kg; 9 st 4 lb), featherweight.

== Professional career ==
King made his professional debut on 25 April 1926, when he beat Jim Costello. On 10 August 1931 he beat Pat Boy Gorman for the vacant BBBofC Northern Area bantamweight title.

On 21 December 1931 he fought Dick Corbett for the BBBofC British Empire bantamweight title, and the vacant BBBofC British bantamweight title, at Kings Hall, Manchester. King lost the bout but would meet Corbett again on 10 October 1932, this time beating him and winning both titles. He became a popular fighter and crowd-puller, producing a twenty-one match undefeated run, losing his twenty second to Italian Domenico Bernasconi. On 12 June 1933 he successfully defended the British Empire bantamweight title against Canadian bantamweight champion Bobby Leitham, beating him on points.

On 3 July 1933 King fought Panama Al Brown in a losing effort for the IBU World bantamweight title. King almost knocked Brown out in the seventh round, but Brown managed to hold on for a points decision. Years later Brown would comment on the power of the punch the Manchester man displayed. On 12 February 1934 King met Dick Corbett for the third time, losing both his British and British Empire titles on points.

On 27 May 1935 King won his second British bantamweight title after defeating Len Hampston on points. He would hold the British title for the next twelve years, though would only defend it twice, largely due to the outbreak of the Second World War. On 6 May 1936 King fought Nel Tarleton for the BBBofC British featherweight title, losing on points. His first defence of the British bantamweight title was against Jackie Brown, in front of a 20,000 strong crowd at Kings Hall, Manchester on 31 May 1937. King knocked Brown out in the thirteenth round. His second defence was against Len Hampston at Headingley Rugby Ground, Leeds on 22 June 1938. Hampston was disqualified in the third round.

King continued to fight during and after the war but struggled to find any form. On 10 February 1947 he lost the British title to Jackie Paterson, after being knocked out in the seventh round. Having lost his last five bouts, King retired shortly after.

== Second World War ==
During the Second World War King fought in the Royal Navy. He was aboard the King George V-class battleship HMS Prince of Wales when she was sunk by a Japanese air attack off Kuantan, in the South China Sea.

== Notable bouts ==
Result	Opponent	Type	Rd., Time	Date	Location	Notes
Win	(United Kingdom) Len Hampston	DQ	3 (15)	1938-06-22	(United Kingdom) Headingley Rugby Ground, Leeds	Retained BBBofC British bantamweight title.
Win	(United Kingdom) Jackie Brown	KO	13 (15)	1937-05-31	(United Kingdom) Kings Hall, Manchester, Lancashire	Retained BBBofC British bantamweight title.
Loss	(United Kingdom) Nel Tarleton	PTS	15	1936-05-06	(United Kingdom) Anfield, Liverpool	For BBBofC British featherweight title.
Win	(United Kingdom) Len Hampston	PTS	15	1935-05-27	(United Kingdom) Kings Hall, Manchester, Lancashire	Won vacant BBBofC British bantamweight title.
Loss	Panama Al Brown	PTS	15	1933-07-03	(United Kingdom) Kings Hall, Manchester, Lancashire	For IBU World bantamweight title.
Win	(Canada) Bobby Leitham	PTS	15	1933-06-12	(United Kingdom) Olympia, Kensington, London	Retained BBBofC British Empire bantamweight title.
Win	(United Kingdom) Dick Corbett	PTS	15	1932-10-10	(United Kingdom) Kings Hall, Manchester, Lancashire	Won BBBofC British Empire bantamweight and vacant BBBofC British bantamweight titles.
