= Roderick Jones (baritone) =

Welsh opera singer

Roderick Jones (2 June 1910 – 16 September 1992) was a Welsh opera singer who sang leading baritone roles with the Sadlers Wells Opera Company and the Welsh National Opera during the late 1940s and 1950s.

Jones was born in Ferndale in the Rhondda Valley of Wales. The son of a coal miner, he initially worked in the mines himself before studying piano and voice at the Royal Academy of Music. His studies were interrupted by World War II when he served in the Royal Navy. After the war in Europe ended, he was engaged by Sadlers Wells where on 7 June 1945 he made his operatic debut as Balstrode in the world premiere of Benjamin Britten's Peter Grimes. He joined the Welsh National Opera in 1951 and remained with the company for the rest of his career. Amongst his notable performances there were Montfort in I vespri siciliani and the title role in Nabucco. After his retirement from the stage in the early 1960s he became the Director of the Jamaica School of Music. He returned to Wales in 1970 and taught singing at Aberystwyth University College. Jones died in Newport, Wales at the age of 82.
