= Ferndale, Rhondda Cynon Taf =

Town in Wales

Ferndale: Welsh: Glynrhedynog
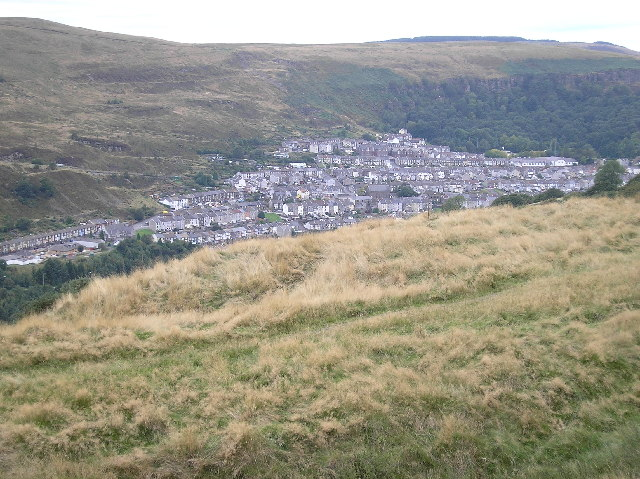

- Location within Rhondda Cynon Taf
- Population: 4,178 (2011)
- OS grid reference: ST000964
- Principal area: Rhondda Cynon Taf
- Preserved county: Mid Glamorgan
- Country: Wales
- Sovereign state: United Kingdom
- Post town: Ferndale
- Postcode district: CF43
- Dialling code: 01443
- Police: South Wales
- Fire: South Wales
- Ambulance: Welsh
- UK Parliament: Rhondda
- Senedd Cymru – Welsh Parliament: Rhondda
- List of places UK Wales Rhondda Cynon Taf 51.661°N 3.448°W Community map: Map of the community

Ferndale (Welsh: Glynrhedynog) is a town and community located in the Rhondda Valley in the county borough of Rhondda Cynon Taf, Wales. Neighbouring villages are Blaenllechau, Maerdy and Tylorstown. Ferndale was industrialised in the mid-19th century. The first coal mine shaft was sunk in 1857 and Ferndale was the first community to be intensively industrialised in the Rhondda Valley.

== History ==
In Welsh, Ferndale is known as Glynrhedynog, the name of one of the old farms on which the town is built. In its infancy Glynrhedynog was also known as Trerhondda, after the name of the first large chapel to be built in the town. The naming of settlements after chapels was widespread in Wales at the time, but neither Glynrhedynog nor Trerhondda was used for long. Glynrhedynog is made from the words glyn (valley) and rhedynog (ferny), so coal from the Glynrhedynog pits was marketed as Ferndale coal, a much easier name for English buyers to assimilate.

The Ferndale pits drew workers and their families to the area, and by the 1880s Ferndale was well established as a thriving town. With the phasing in of bilingual road signs from the late 1980s onwards, the name Glynrhedynog gradually reappeared and is now the officially designated Welsh language name for Ferndale. The village adopted the English language during the Industrial Revolution, but the Welsh language is now on the increase in Ferndale. A Welsh language school is situated near the park and is named after the park's lake, Llyn-y-Forwyn (the Maiden's Lake).

== Industry ==
The pioneer of coal mining at Ferndale was David Davis of Blaengwawr, Aberdare, who already had an extensive colliery business in the neighbouring Aberdare Valley. His wealth enabled him to engage in costly but unsuccessful sinkings in the Rhondda Fach in the 1860s until he finally struck a good seam at Ferndale.

== Ferndale Colliery disasters ==
There were two large coal mining disasters in Ferndale during the 19th century:

- On 8 November 1867 an underground explosion killed 178 miners at the Ferndale Colliery owned by David Davis and Sons Ltd.
- On 10 June 1869 another explosion killed 53 miners.

== Education ==
There is Little Ferns Day Nursery Ferndale providing care and education for toddlers. The main Primary school of Ferndale is situated next to Darran Park with the school aptly named Darran Park Primary. (Darrran Park Primary is a predominantly English speaking school)

Ferndale Community school (secondary school) is actually situated in Maerdy. With a community swimming pool and Gym situated on site.

The Welsh school in Ferndale Gynradd Gymraeg Llyn y Forwyn has moved and upgraded its facilities as of 2024 from its previous location on Darran Terrace to Maerdy Industrial Estate.

== Governance ==
A Ferndale electoral ward was coterminous with the borders of the Ferndale community and elected two county councillors to Rhondda Cynon Taf County Borough Council. Since 1995, representation was mainly by the Labour Party, but the ward also had a Plaid Cymru councillor from 1999 to 2004 and an independent councillor from 2012 to 2017. At the May 2017 election, Labour and Plaid Cymru won a councillor each.

Following a 2018 review of electoral arrangements by the Local Democracy and Boundary Commission for Wales, it was proposed to merge Ferndale with neighbouring Maerdy into the Ferndale and Maerdy ward. The proposals took effect from the 2022 council elections, which saw Susan Morgans and Jayne Smith elected for Labour.

== Modern Ferndale ==
Ferndale has developed over recent years. Some new features have been added such as a 3G football field, car park and an all-weather cricket training enclosure. The Sky TV comedy series Stella is largely filmed on location in Ferndale. Scenes from The Crown Season 3 Episode 3 which depicts the Aberfan Disaster were filmed in Ferndale.

== Transport ==
Between 1849 and 1856, the Taff Vale Railway opened the Maerdy Branch from Porth, including a station at Ferndale. Passenger services were withdrawn in 1964, but coal trains continued until August 1986 when the line closed completely. Coal from Mardy Colliery was then raised through Tower Colliery. The track was lifted in 1996. Since 2005, the southern section of the line from Porth to Pontygwaith has been used for the A4223 Porth and Lower Rhondda Fach Relief Road (Porth Bypass). The upper section, including the section passing Ferndale, has become a branch of the Taff Trail cycleway.

== Religion ==
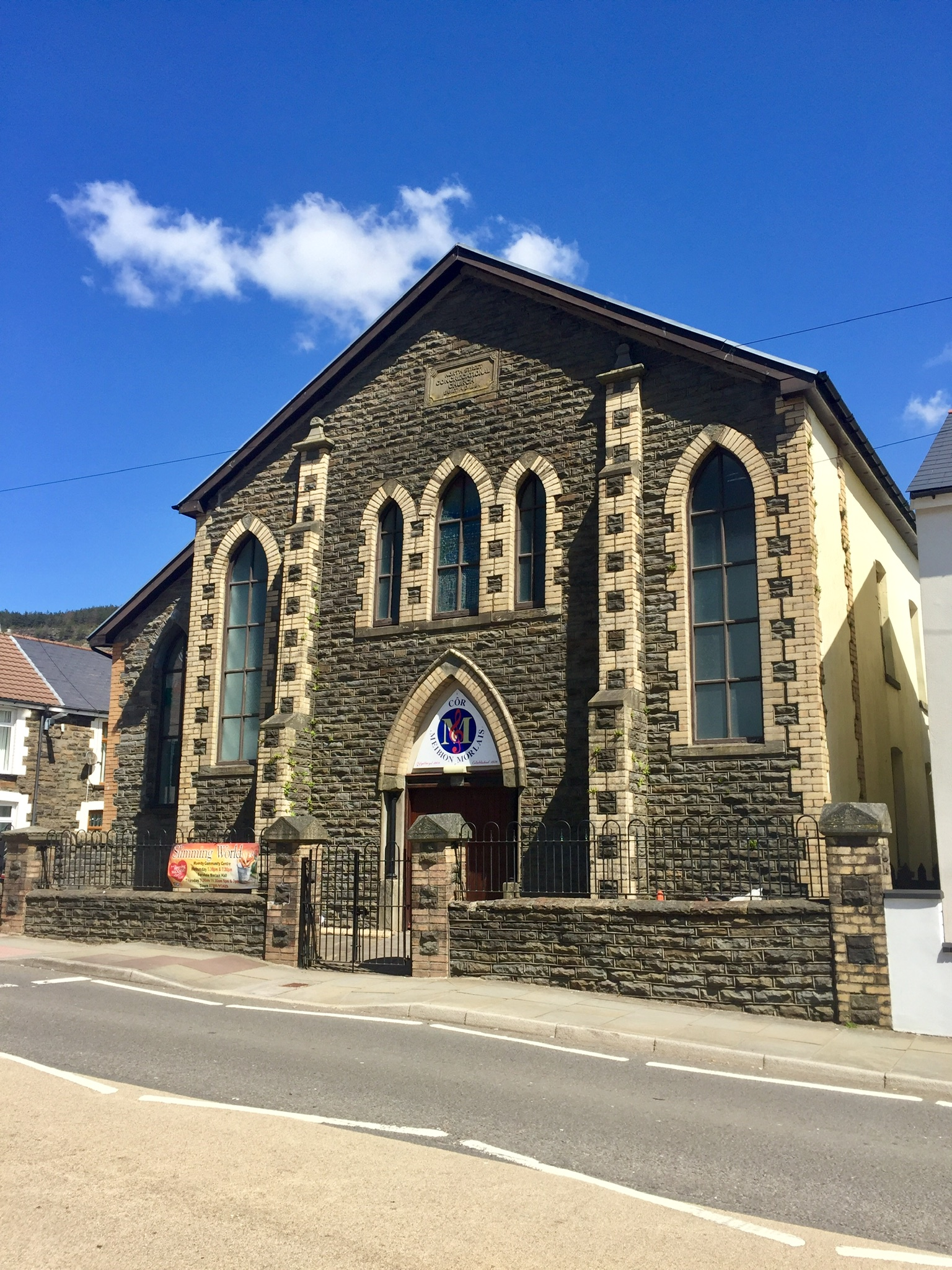
The Old Morlais Chapel

There are several chapels and churches in or near Ferndale:

- St Dunstan's Church (Church in Wales)
- Bethel Baptist Church (Baptist)
- Rhondda Fach Methodist Church (also called Ferndale Methodist Church, Methodist)
- Capel Penuel (Calvinistic Methodist)
- Trerhondda Welsh Independent Chapel (Welsh Independents)

== Local Male Voice Choir ==
Côr Meibion Morlais (Morlais Male Choir) was founded in 1928 as the "Mustard Club" in Tylorstown by Alfred "Alfie" Morgan. Based in Ferndale, Rhondda Valleys, using the above-mentioned Morlais Chapel as their rehearsal ground and to host choir recitals.

== Sport ==
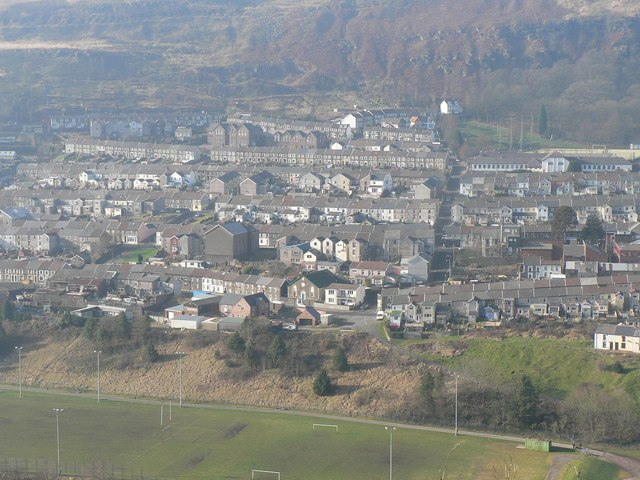
View over the town

Ferndale is home to rugby union club Ferndale RFC, whose first XV team play in the Welsh Rugby Union leagues.

Adjacent to Llyn y Forwyn is a 3G football field that replaced the old AstroTurf field in 2023. Darran Park has a tennis court and a bowling green.

Ferndale Bowls Club has a strong standing in the Welsh bowls community; several players from the club have represented Wales at international level in the past. J.S. Hill represented Wales in the 1930s, and several others, including Gareth Hughes, Lee Morgans and Martin Jones, have often represented Wales in more recent years at both Junior and Senior team level.

The club was runner-up in the Carruthers Shield in both 1947 and 2010. In the 2022 season Ferndale Bowls Club reached the last 16 of the Carruthers Shield, losing to Llanbradach. In 2023 the club reached the last 16 of the Carruthers Shield, losing to Crosskeys. In 2024 they reached the last 8, again losing to Crosskeys.

The club is always well represented in the Welsh National Championships each year, with several players having won Welsh titles. A large number of the club's members have won county titles and represent the county team at both Championship and Senior level.

The club plays in three local leagues:

- Cardiff & District Municipal League (Premier 1)
- Mid Glamorgan League (Division 1)
- Rhondda League (Division 1).

The club has won numerous league titles and league cup titles in these leagues.

In December 2006, the Ferndale Skate Park was opened with indoor ramps and other equipment available to BMX riders, rollerbladers and skateboarders. The skate park began with the aim of improving the prospects of school leavers in the area, providing a "safe haven" from the influences of drugs and alcohol, and encouraging sports and healthy living. It later received National Lottery continuation funding as well as a Rhondda Trust grant to secure the future for three more years. However it closed in 2014.

Ferndale Athletic Football Club

The club joined the Welsh Football League for the 1956–57 season, and immediately saw success, finishing as runners-up in Welsh Football League Division Two East. They remained in the Welsh League until leaving the league after the 1997–98 season. The club folded the following year.

The club's best performance was the 1974–75 when they finished as runners-up by one point to Newport County's reserves side, in Premier Division, which was the top tier of league football in the south of Wales at the time.

The Club reformed in 2010. The brainchild of Micky (Villan) Evans(Life President)supported by Dean Gauvain and Rachel Millard All working tirelessly behind the scenes for a rejuvenated Ferndale Athletic Football Club, initially running junior football teams in the Aberdare Rhondda Merthyr Football League.

They are now for the first time since 1998 running a senior team playing in The Rhondda Football League on the newly re-furbished and relayed 4G pitch at Darren Park.

Current Officials.

Club Secretary :TBC

Chairman : Mr Dean Gauvain

Head Coach : Mr David Evans

== Notable people ==
- Stanley Baker (1928–1976), actor
- Brian Bedford (1933–2022), professional footballer who spent a majority of his career with Queens Park Rangers, was born in Ferndale.
- David "Alan" Evans (1949–1999), darts player
- Ginger Jones (1905–1986) Welsh featherweight champion boxer, was born in Ferndale.
- Roderick Jones (1910–1992), baritone
- Meirion James Trow (born 1949), author
- Bartholomew Walsh (1890 – 13 December 1959), Welsh trade unionist. Born in Ferndale.
- Edgar Watkins (1887–1960) Olympic Gymnast who competed at the 1908 Summer Olympics, was born in Ferndale.
- D. J. Williams (1885–1970), Welsh nationalist writer, worked as a teenager in local mines and lodged at 32 Dyffryn Street, around 1905.
- Wyn Lewis Williams (born 1951), High Court judge
