= Victor Perez (Tunisian boxer) =

Tunisian boxer

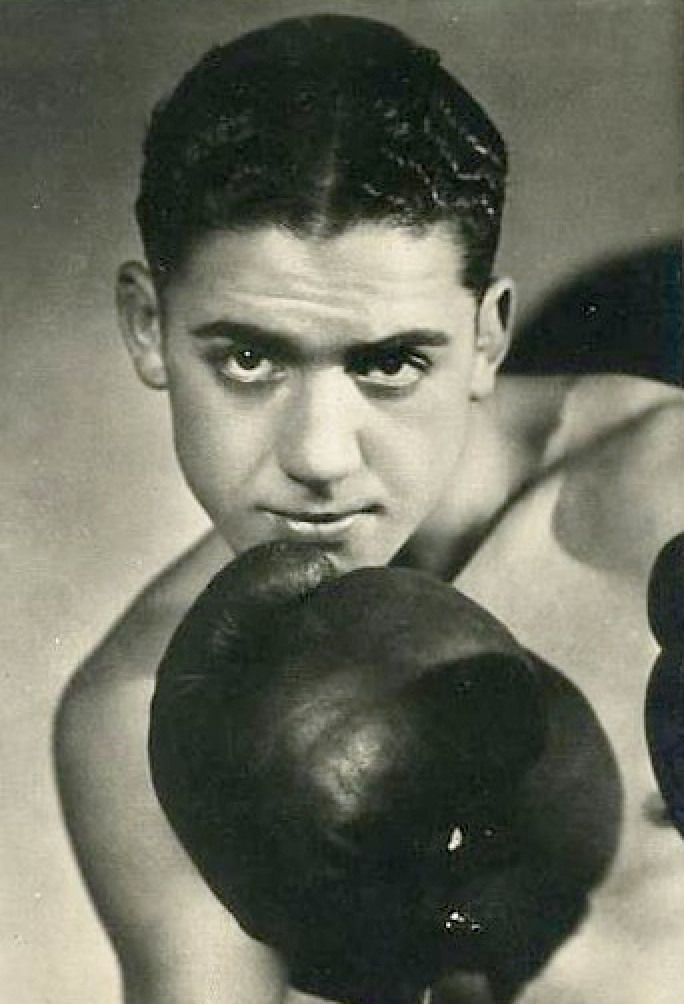

Personal information
- Nickname: Young Perez
- Born: Messaoud Hai Victor Perez; 18 October 1911 Tunis, French Tunisia
- Died: 21 January 1945 (aged 33) Gliwice, Poland
- Height: 5 ft 1 in (1.55 m)
- Weight: Flyweight; Range 108 to 119 lb 49 to 54 kg

Boxing career

Boxing record
- Total fights: 138
- Wins: 92
- Win by KO: 29
- Losses: 31
- Draws: 15

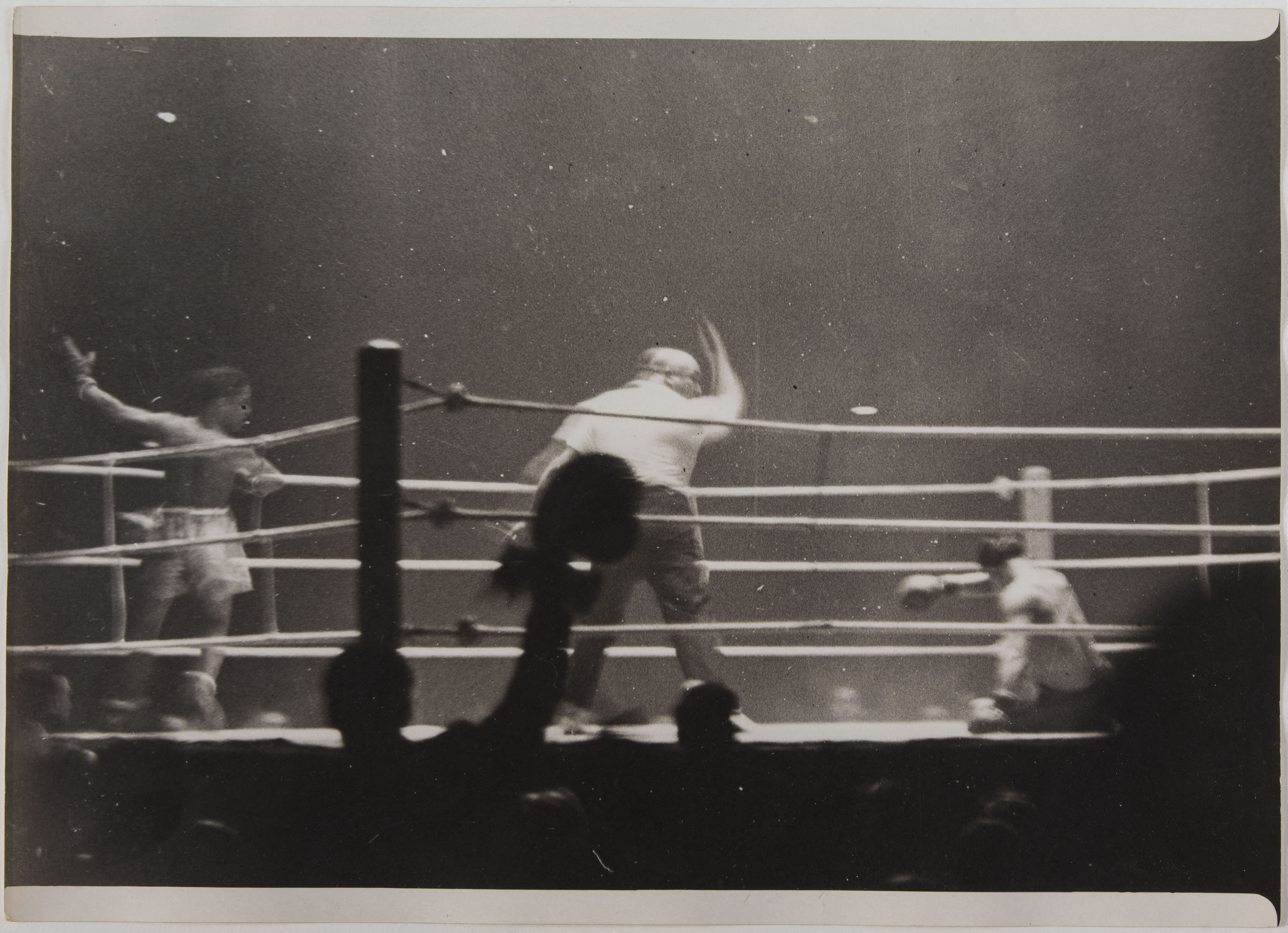
Victory of Young Perez against Frankie Genaro (1931)

Messaoud Hai Victor Perez (Arabic: فيكتور بيريز, Hebrew: מסעוד חי ויקטור פרץ) (18 October 1911 – 21 January 1945) was a Tunisian Jewish boxer, who became the World Flyweight Champion in 1931 and 1932, fighting under his ring name Young Perez. He was managed by Leon Bellier. He was a victim of the Holocaust having been imprisoned at the Auschwitz concentration camp before making a death march to Gleiwitz where he was killed.

== Early life ==
Perez was born to Sephardic Jewish parents Khomsa "Khmaïssa" Nizard, and Makhlouf "Khaïlou" René Perez, a household goods salesman. He was raised along with his four siblings in Dar-El Berdgana, the Jewish quarter of Tunis. He started training as a boxer at age 14 along with his older brother Benjamin “Kid” Perez to emulate his idol Battling Siki, a boxing champion from Senegal. Near the end of 1928, after competing against the best of the local boxing talent in Tunis, at 17 Perez traveled to Paris, to pursue his dream of becoming a world boxing champion. In his youth, after winning the World flyweight title, he had a brief relationship with French-Italian actress Mireille Balin of Monaco.

== Boxing career ==
=== French Fly champion, 1931 ===
Perez's first attempt at France's Flyweight championship came on 8 February 1930, but resulted in a 4th round loss to Henry "Kid" Oliva in Limoges, France.

In only his 54th professional match, Perez won the French Flyweight title in Paris on 4 June 1931, defeating Valentin Angelmann in 15 rounds.

=== World Fly champion, October 1931 ===
On 24 October 1931, he won the International Boxing Union and National Boxing Association (NBA) World Flyweight crown at Paris's famed Palais de Sports in a second round knockout of the exceptional American boxer Frankie Genaro. Perez seemed awed by the American champion who appeared to take the first round after a rally just before the bell. But responding to an attempt at a left hook by Genaro, Perez proved speedier and tagged his opponent with a crushing right hook to the chin that ended the match only ten seconds into round two. Although Genaro struggled to his knees by the count of eight, he was unable to get any further before the referee completed the count. The loss was only Genaro's second by knockout in his long career. Perez subsequently became the youngest French citizen to win a world boxing title.

Facing stiff competition, he lost the title the next year, on 31 October 1932, to Jackie Brown in a twelve round points decision in Manchester, England. He then moved to the bantamweight class. In an attempt at the World Bantamweight title on 19 February 1934, he was defeated in a difficult 15 round bout by "Panama" Al Brown, who held a ten inch height advantage. He retired from boxing in December 1938 with a record of 92 wins (28 of them knockouts), 26 losses, and 15 draws.

== Auschwitz ==
On 21 September 1943, after being denounced by an acquaintance, Perez was arrested in Paris by the Milice Francaise, a French collaborationist paramilitary force of the Vichy Regime. He was detained in the Drancy internment camp before being transported to the German extermination camp of Auschwitz where he was assigned to the Monowitz subcamp to serve as a slave laborer for I.G. Farben at the Buna-Werke.

During his transport to Auschwitz on 7 October 1943, he became part of "Transport 60" a group of 1,000 prisoners shipped from Drancy. During his internment, he was forced to participate in boxing matches for the amusement of the German guards and officers. By 1945, Perez was one of just 31 survivors of the original 1,000.

To escape from the Russians rapidly advancing on German held territory, the Nazis abandoned Auschwitz in January 1945. On 18 January 1945, Perez became one of the prisoners on the death march from Monowitz in Poland, 37 miles (60 km) Northwest to the Gleiwitz concentration camp near the Czech border. Perez was reported to have been murdered three days later on 21 January. According to eye witness testimony he was shot to death by a guard while attempting to distribute bread he had found in Gleiwitz's kitchen to other starving prisoners.

== Legacy ==
He was inducted into the International Jewish Sports Hall of Fame in 1986. In 2013, his life was made into the French and German-language film Victor Young Perez (also known as Surviving Auschwitz or Perez ha'tza'ir). Perez's role was played by the 2000 French Olympic Gold medalist in light-flyweight boxing, Brahim Asloum.

== Selected fights ==
5 wins, 4 losses
Result	Opponent(s)	Date	Location	Duration	Notes
Win	Valentin Angelmann	4 June 1931	Paris	15 rounds	Won French Fly title
Win	Frankie Genaro	26 October 1931	Paris	2nd round KO	Won NBA World Fly title
Loss	Jackie Brown	31 October 1932	Manchester, Eng.	13 round TKO	Lost NBA World Fly title
Win	Émile Pladner	24 January 1933	Tunis	10 rounds	
Loss	Baltasar Sangchili	18 March 1933	Valencia, Spain	10 rounds	1935 World Bantam champ
Loss	Jackie Brown	3 July 1933	Manchester, Eng.	12 rounds KO	For NBA World Fly title
Loss	Panama Al Brown	19 February 1934	Paris	15 rounds UD	For World Bantam title
Win	Émile Pladner	11 July 1934	Paris	10 rounds	
Win	Eugène Huat	14 April 1936	Tunis	10 rounds	

== See also ==
- List of Jews in sports § Boxing

Status
Preceded by Tony Marino	Latest born world champion to die 21 January 1945 – 6 August 1946	Succeeded by Benny Lynch
