= Baltasar Sangchili =

Spanish boxer (1911-1992)

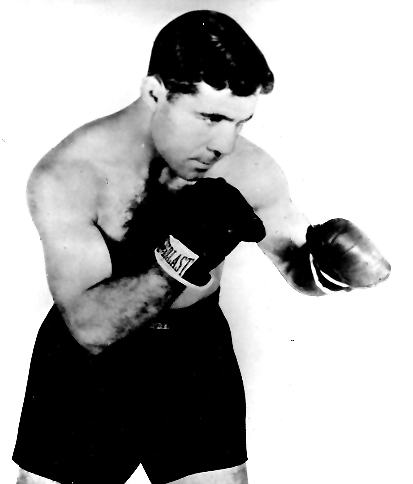
- Sangchili in 1935

Personal information
- Nationality: Spanish
- Born: Baltasar Belenguer Hervas; October 10, 1911 Valencia, Spain
- Died: September 2, 1992 (aged 80)
- Height: 5 ft 1 in (155 cm)
- Weight: Bantamweight

Boxing career
- Reach: 61 1/2 in
- Stance: Orthodox

Boxing record
- Total fights: 110
- Wins: 78
- Win by KO: 36
- Losses: 20
- Draws: 12

Baltasar Berenguer Hervas (October 15, 1911 – September 2, 1992), popularly known in his time as Baltasar Sangchili, was a Spanish boxer who claimed the World Bantamweight Championship. He was the first Spanish fighter in history to win a world championship in boxing. During his illustrious career, he defeated many great fighters including "Panama" Al Brown, Tony Marino, Victor "Young" Perez, Maurice Dubois, Ronnie James, Nicolas Petit-Biquet, Maurice Dubois, Eugène Huat, Carlos Flix and Joseph David.

== Boxing career ==
Sangchili was born in Valencia, Spain on October 15, 1911. When he started his boxing career, to prevent his father from learning of his travels, Baltasar Belenguer took the name of his Chinese partner and friend Chang-Chi-Li (Shang-Chi-Li). Sangchili later told his team: "From now on I want to announce myself as Sangchili Baltasar..."

Before winning the World title, he engaged in 60 fights, and emerged victorious in 50 of them with five defeats. He defeated Carlos Flix to claim the Bantamweight Championship of Spain. He made two attempts to conquer the Bantamweight Championship of Europe against Nicolas Petit-Biquet which ended in draws. In his second attempt, he was defeated in their rematch by a 15-round decision.

He defeated former IBU and NBA Flyweight champion, Victor "Young" Perez on points in 10 rounds in Madrid.

== World Bantamweight Championship ==
On March 18, 1935, Sangchili got his chance to fight reigning World Bantamweight champion Panama Al Brown which ended in a draw but Sangchili won their rematch in a points decision. Once he gained the title, he made successful tours garnering many victories both in Spain and abroad, without putting his title on the line until the veteran Benny Sharkey with over one hundred victories defeated him in Newcastle, England. One month later, he recovered from his defeat against Sharkey by defeating another great opponent, Ronnie James in Liverpool. James had won over fifty fights with only one defeat. On February 10, 1936, he made his debut in the United States, defeating Jimmy Martin and Lew Farber in New York City.

On June 29, 1936 in a bout at New York's Madison Square Garden, against Tony Marino, Sangchili put his title at stake and was knocked out in 14th round, though Sangchili held a points advantage through much of the bout. In October of the same year, Sangchili got his revenge on Marino, defeating him by points in 10 rounds, though the bout was not for the title.

Sangchili ended his North American tour with a defeat in Mexico against local boxer Juan Zurita and returned to Europe where he made several battles in France in the next two years. He fought former champion Panama Al Brown for the third time for the vacant IBU Bantamweight Championship of the World. The fight was held in Paris and this time Brown won in a fifteen-round points decision.

He ended his career in 1940 by taking the national Bantamweight Championship of Spain against Miguel Safont in a twelve-round points decision. He ended his career with a record of 77 wins with 37 knockouts, 20 losses and 12 draws. He died in September 1992.

== Professional boxing record ==
110 fights	78 wins	20 losses
By knockout	36	1
By decision	41	15
By disqualification	1	4
Draws	12	

No.	Result	Record	Opponent	Type	Round	Date	Location	Notes
110	Win	78–20–12	Jim Alpanes	PTS	10	Jun 8, 1940	Plaza de Toros, Valencia, Comunidad Valenciana, Spain	
109	Win	77–20–12	Miguel Safont	TKO	4 (12)	Mar 18, 1940	Plaza de Toros, Valencia, Comunidad Valenciana, Spain	Retained Spanish bantamweight title
108	Win	76–20–12	Jim Alpanes	TKO	7 (10)	Dec 23, 1939	Frontón Urumea, San Sebastian, País Vasco, Spain	
107	Draw	75–20–12	Miguel Safont	PTS	10	Dec 6, 1939	Gran Price, Barcelona, Cataluña, Spain	
106	Loss	75–20–11	Peter Kane	PTS	10	Apr 3, 1939	Earls Court Empress Hall, Kensington, London, England, U.K.	
105	Loss	75–19–11	Jim Brady	PTS	12	Mar 13, 1939	Manchester, Lancashire, England, U.K.	
104	Loss	75–18–11	Robert Bourdet	PTS	10	Dec 29, 1938	Salle Wagram, Paris, Paris, France	
103	Loss	75–17–11	Ernst Weiss	PTS	10	Dec 9, 1938	Deutschlandhalle, Charlottenburg, Berlin, Germany	
102	Loss	75–16–11	Valentin Angelmann	DQ	4 (10)	Oct 6, 1938	Salle Wagram, Paris, Paris, France	
101	Win	75–15–11	Eugène Huat	TKO	7 (10)	Apr 21, 1938	Salle Wagram, Paris, Paris, France	
100	Loss	74–15–11	Panama Al Brown	SD	15	Mar 4, 1938	Palais des Sports, Paris, Paris, France	For vacant IBU bantamweight title
99	Draw	74–14–11	Joseph Decico	PTS	10	Feb 3, 1938	Salle Wagram, Paris, Paris, France	
98	Win	74–14–10	Victor Perez	PTS	10	Oct 28, 1937	Salle Wagram, Paris, Paris, France	
97	Win	73–14–10	Maurice Dupuis	TKO	6 (10)	Oct 14, 1937	Salle Wagram, Paris, Paris, France	
96	Win	72–14–10	Roger Cotti	TKO	3 (10)	Oct 7, 1937	Salle Wagram, Paris, Paris, France	
95	Win	71–14–10	Henri Sanchez	TKO	3 (10)	Sep 16, 1937	Salle Wagram, Paris, Paris, France	
94	Loss	70–14–10	Juan Zurita	PTS	10	Jan 1, 1937	El Toreo de Cuatro Caminos, Mexico City, Distrito Federal, Mexico	
93	Win	70–13–10	Tony Marino	PTS	10	Oct 15, 1936	Motor Square Garden, Pittsburgh, Pennsylvania, U.S.	
92	Loss	69–13–10	Frankie Martin	UD	10	Sep 28, 1936	Forum, Montreal, Quebec, Canada	
91	Loss	69–12–10	Tony Marino	KO	14 (15)	Jun 29, 1936	Dyckman Oval, Manhattan, New York City, New York, U.S.	Lost The Ring bantamweight title
90	Win	69–11–10	Lew Farber	PTS	10	May 29, 1936	Madison Square Garden, Manhattan, New York City, New York, U.S.	
89	Win	68–11–10	Jimmy Martin	TKO	8 (10)	May 16, 1936	Ridgewood Grove, Brooklyn, New York City, New York, U.S.	
88	Win	67–11–10	Luis Soria	PTS	12	Apr 4, 1936	Frontón Cinema, Zaragoza, Aragón, Spain	
87	Win	66–11–10	Tony Butcher	TKO	4 (12)	Mar 21, 1936	Plaza de Toros, Valencia, Comunidad Valenciana, Spain	
86	Win	65–11–10	Ronnie James	PTS	12	Mar 12, 1936	The Stadium, Liverpool, Merseyside, England, U.K.	
85	Loss	64–11–10	Benny Sharkey	PTS	12	Feb 10, 1936	New St James Hall, Newcastle, London, England, U.K.	
84	Win	64–10–10	Alfredo Magnolfi	PTS	10	Oct 18, 1935	Teatro Circo Price, Madrid, Comunidad de Madrid, Spain	
83	Win	63–10–10	Victor Perez	PTS	10	Sep 15, 1935	Arenes de Casablanca, Casablanca, Morocco	Retained The Ring bantamweight title
82	Win	62–10–10	Nicolas Petit Biquet	TKO	11 (15)	Aug 31, 1935	Stade Municipal, Algiers, Oran, Algeria	Retained The Ring bantamweight title
81	Win	61–10–10	Young Borel	PTS	10	Aug 3, 1935	Arenes d'Eckmühl, Oran, Algeria	
80	Win	60–10–10	Vicente Riambau	PTS	10	Jul 14, 1935	Melilla, Ciudad de Melilla, Spain	
79	Win	59–10–10	Rene Gabes	KO	3 (10)	Jun 22, 1935	Plaza de Toros, Valencia, Comunidad Valenciana, Spain	Retained The Ring bantamweight title
78	Win	58–10–10	Panama Al Brown	PTS	15	Jun 1, 1935	Plaza de Toros, Valencia, Comunidad Valenciana, Spain	Won The Ring bantamweight title
77	Win	57–10–10	Panama Al Brown	PTS	10	Mar 18, 1935	Plaza de Toros, Valencia, Comunidad Valenciana, Spain	
76	Win	56–10–10	Kid Davidt	SD	10	Jan 16, 1935	Palais des Sports, Schaerbeek, Bruxelles-Capitale, Belgium	
75	Win	55–10–10	Young Borel	PTS	10	Jan 4, 1935	Élysée Montmartre, Paris, Paris, France	
74	Draw	54–10–10	Joseph Decico	PTS	10	Nov 28, 1934	Paris-Ring, Paris, Paris, France	
73	Win	54–10–9	Eugene Lorenzoni	PTS	10	Oct 16, 1934	Salón Nuevo Mundo, Barcelona, Cataluña, Spain	
72	Loss	53–10–9	Nicolas Petit Biquet	PTS	15	Aug 18, 1934	Stade Municipal, Algiers, Oran, Algeria	For IBU bantamweight title
71	Win	53–9–9	Alfredo Magnolfi	KO	4 (10)	Aug 4, 1934	Stade Municipal, Algiers, Oran, Algeria	
70	Win	52–9–9	Victor Perez	PTS	10	Jun 17, 1934	Arenes d'Eckmühl, Oran, Algeria	
69	Win	51–9–9	Victor Ferrand	KO	4 (10)	Apr 14, 1934	Plaza de Toros, Valencia, Comunidad Valenciana, Spain	
68	Win	50–9–9	Giovanni Sili	KO	2 (10)	Mar 18, 1934	Plaza de Toros, Valencia, Comunidad Valenciana, Spain	
67	Win	49–9–9	Henri Barras	DQ	4 (10)	Feb 23, 1934	Teatro Circo Price, Madrid, Comunidad de Madrid, Spain	Barras was disqualified for illegal use of his head
66	Draw	48–9–9	Carlos Flix	PTS	12	Feb 6, 1934	Teatro Circo Price, Madrid, Comunidad de Madrid, Spain	Retained Spanish bantamweight title
65	Win	48–9–8	Victor Ferrand	PTS	10	Jan 19, 1934	Teatro Circo Price, Madrid, Comunidad de Madrid, Spain	
64	Win	47–9–8	Renico Simmons	TKO	3 (10)	Jan 11, 1934	Cine Monumental-Salón Moderno, Alicante, Comunidad Valenciana, Spain	
63	Win	46–9–8	Louis Legras	PTS	10	Oct 30, 1933	Teatro Circo Price, Madrid, Comunidad de Madrid, Spain	
62	Win	45–9–8	Gennaro Vicini	KO	2 (10)	Oct 25, 1933	Teatro Principal, Castellón de la Plana, Comunidad Valenciana, Spain	
61	Win	44–9–8	Alfredo Magnolfi	PTS	10	Oct 17, 1933	Teatro Circo Price, Madrid, Comunidad de Madrid, Spain	
60	Win	43–9–8	Ottavio Gori	KO	4 (10)	Sep 10, 1933	Plaza de Toros, Valencia, Comunidad Valenciana, Spain	
59	Win	42–9–8	Ottavio Gori	KO	6 (?)	Aug 27, 1933	Parque de la Merced, Malaga, Andalucía, Spain	
58	Draw	41–9–8	Nicolas Petit Biquet	SD	15	Jul 15, 1933	Plaza de Toros, Valencia, Comunidad Valenciana, Spain	For IBU bantamweight title
57	Win	41–9–7	Ottavio Gori	PTS	10	Jun 11, 1933	Plaza de Toros, Valencia, Comunidad Valenciana, Spain	
56	Win	40–9–7	Carlos Flix	PTS	12	Apr 22, 1933	Plaza de Toros, Valencia, Comunidad Valenciana, Spain	Won vacant Spanish bantamweight title
55	Win	39–9–7	Young Perez	PTS	10	Mar 18, 1933	Plaza de Toros, Valencia, Comunidad Valenciana, Spain	
54	Win	38–9–7	Emilio Iglesias	PTS	10	Feb 7, 1933	Teatro Circo Olympia, Barcelona, Cataluña, Spain	
53	Win	37–9–7	Jean Cuart	TKO	7 (10)	Jan 17, 1933	Teatro Circo Olympia, Barcelona, Cataluña, Spain	
52	Loss	36–9–7	Lorenzo Vitria	PTS	10	Dec 20, 1932	Teatro Circo Olympia, Barcelona, Cataluña, Spain	
51	Win	36–8–7	Manuel Gonzalez	PTS	10	Nov 3, 1932	Teatro Circo Olympia, Barcelona, Cataluña, Spain	
50	Win	35–8–7	Albert Biesmans	PTS	10	Sep 3, 1932	Iris Park, Barcelona, Cataluña, Spain	
49	Draw	34–8–7	Miguel Safont	PTS	10	Aug 20, 1932	Iris Park, Barcelona, Cataluña, Spain	
48	Win	34–8–6	Miguel Safont	PTS	8	Jul 6, 1932	Salón Nuevo Mundo, Barcelona, Cataluña, Spain	
47	Loss	33–8–6	Fortunato Ortega	PTS	8	Feb 12, 1932	Salón Nuevo Mundo, Barcelona, Cataluña, Spain	
46	Loss	33–7–6	Juan Castello	DQ	1 (6)	Jan 31, 1932	Parque de la Merced, Malaga, Andalucía, Spain	For vacant Levante flyweight title
45	Win	33–6–6	Jose Maria Liberato	PTS	8	Sep 27, 1931	Parque de la Merced, Malaga, Andalucía, Spain	
44	Win	32–6–6	Jose Maria Liberato	PTS	8	Sep 16, 1931	Parque de la Merced, Malaga, Andalucía, Spain	
43	Win	31–6–6	Jose Maria Liberato	PTS	8	Sep 5, 1931	Parque de la Merced, Malaga, Andalucía, Spain	
42	Win	30–6–6	Jose Uceda	PTS	8	Aug 29, 1931	Parque de la Merced, Malaga, Andalucía, Spain	
41	Win	29–6–6	Fernando Lorente	TKO	8 (10)	Aug 20, 1931	Gibraltar	
40	Win	28–6–6	Braham	TKO	6 (10)	Jul 31, 1931	Casablanca, Morocco	
39	Win	27–6–6	Fernando Morales	PTS	8	Jul 26, 1931	Spain	
38	Win	26–6–6	Francisco Bella	PTS	10	Mar 28, 1931	Sevilla, Andalucía, Spain	
37	Win	25–6–6	Louis Verdier	KO	2 (8)	Mar 20, 1931	Sevilla, Andalucía, Spain	
36	Win	24–6–6	Javier Rull	TKO	4 (?)	Jan 17, 1931	Sevilla, Andalucía, Spain	
35	Win	23–6–6	Rafael Garrido	TKO	3 (?)	Jan 10, 1931	Circo de la Alegría, Sevilla, Andalucía, Spain	
34	Win	22–6–6	Tony Samber	PTS	6	Nov 23, 1930	Parque de la Merced, Malaga, Andalucía, Spain	
33	Win	21–6–6	Ignacio Gomez	KO	3 (8)	Nov 2, 1930	Parque de la Merced, Malaga, Andalucía, Spain	
32	Win	20–6–6	Kid Brand	TKO	2 (?)	Sep 24, 1930	Parque de la Merced, Malaga, Andalucía, Spain	
31	Win	19–6–6	Manuel Seco	RTD	3 (?)	Sep 17, 1930	Parque de la Merced, Malaga, Andalucía, Spain	
30	Win	18–6–6	Antonio Mejias	TKO	3 (6)	Sep 7, 1930	Parque Recreativo Duque de Rivas, Cordoba, Andalucía, Spain	
29	Win	17–6–6	Caliche	KO	1 (6)	Sep 4, 1930	Parque Recreativo Duque de Rivas, Cordoba, Andalucía, Spain	
28	Win	16–6–6	Francisco Parejo	RTD	2 (6)	Aug 30, 1930	Plaza de Toros del Triunfo, Granada, Andalucía, Spain	
27	Win	15–6–6	Antonio Hernandez	PTS	4	Aug 27, 1930	Parque de la Merced, Malaga, Andalucía, Spain	
26	Win	14–6–6	Dany Abdelkader	KO	2 (?)	Aug 24, 1930	Parque de la Merced, Malaga, Andalucía, Spain	
25	Win	13–6–6	Caliche	KO	2 (?)	Aug 16, 1930	Parque de la Merced, Malaga, Andalucía, Spain	
24	Win	12–6–6	Jose Maria Liberato	PTS	8	Aug 1, 1930	Parque de la Merced, Malaga, Andalucía, Spain	
23	Win	11–6–6	Rafael Garrido	KO	1 (?)	Jul 26, 1930	Parque de la Merced, Malaga, Andalucía, Spain	
22	Win	10–6–6	Pascual Latorre	PTS	6	Jul 17, 1930	Plaza de Toros, Alicante, Comunidad Valenciana, Spain	
21	Win	9–6–6	Jaime Garcia	KO	1 (?)	Jul 12, 1930	Elche, Comunidad Valenciana, Spain	
20	Win	8–6–6	Pedro Bautista	KO	5 (6)	Jul 5, 1930	Plaza de Toros, Alicante, Comunidad Valenciana, Spain	
19	Win	7–6–6	Vicente Santacruz	PTS	6	Jun 8, 1930	Plaza de Toros, Alicante, Comunidad Valenciana, Spain	
18	Loss	6–6–6	Isidro Viana	DQ	2 (6)	Mar 12, 1930	Teatro Apolo, Valencia, Comunidad Valenciana, Spain	Sangchili was disqualified when Viana couldn't come out for round 3 after being hit low
17	Win	6–5–6	Saulo	PTS	6	Jan 2, 1930	Spain	Exact date and location uncertain
16	Loss	5–5–6	Antonio Las Heras	PTS	6	Nov 24, 1929	Plaza de Toros, Valencia, Comunidad Valenciana, Spain	
15	Win	5–4–6	Antonio Bernabeu	TKO	2 (6)	Nov 17, 1929	Plaza de Toros, Valencia, Comunidad Valenciana, Spain	
14	Draw	4–4–6	Antonio Bernabeu	PTS	6	Oct 19, 1929	Plaza de Toros, Valencia, Comunidad Valenciana, Spain	
13	Draw	4–4–5	Isidro Viana	PTS	6	Oct 5, 1929	Plaza de Toros, Valencia, Comunidad Valenciana, Spain	
12	Win	4–4–4	Isidro Viana	PTS	4	Sep 21, 1929	Plaza de Toros, Valencia, Comunidad Valenciana, Spain	
11	Loss	3–4–4	Pascual Latorre	PTS	6	Aug 24, 1929	Plaza de Toros, Alicante, Comunidad Valenciana, Spain	
10	Win	3–3–4	Tony Samber	PTS	4	Aug 4, 1929	Plaza de Toros, Valencia, Comunidad Valenciana, Spain	
9	Loss	2–3–4	Isidro Viana	PTS	4	Jun 22, 1929	Plaza de Toros, Valencia, Comunidad Valenciana, Spain	
8	Loss	2–2–4	Saenz	TKO	2 (4)	Jun 8, 1929	Plaza de Toros, Valencia, Comunidad Valenciana, Spain	Sangchili was disqualified for hitting low
7	Win	2–1–4	Casanova	TKO	3 (4)	Apr 21, 1929	Cine Coliseum, Valencia, Comunidad Valenciana, Spain	
6	Draw	1–1–4	Gimeno	PTS	4	Dec 25, 1928	Plaza de Toros, Valencia, Comunidad Valenciana, Spain	
5	Draw	1–1–3	Gimeno	PTS	4	Nov 15, 1928	Teatro de la Princesa, Valencia, Comunidad Valenciana, Spain	
4	Draw	1–1–2	Vercher	PTS	4	Nov 4, 1928	Plaza de Toros, Valencia, Comunidad Valenciana, Spain	
3	Win	1–1–1	Gimeno	PTS	4	Sep 1, 1928	Plaza de Toros, Valencia, Comunidad Valenciana, Spain	
2	Draw	0–1–1	Gimeno	PTS	4	Aug 23, 1928	Plaza de Toros, Valencia, Comunidad Valenciana, Spain	
1	Loss	0–1	Antonio Barber	PTS	6	Apr 8, 1928	Plaza de Toros, Valencia, Comunidad Valenciana, Spain	

== See also ==
- List of Bantamweight boxing champions
- List of The Ring world champions#Bantamweight

Achievements
Preceded by Panama Al Brown	World Bantamweight Champion; June 1, 1935 – June 29, 1936	Succeeded by Tony Marino
