= Ginger Jones =

Wales boxer

Personal information
- Nickname: Ginger
- Nationality: Welsh
- Born: Bryn Jones; 1905 Ferndale, Wales
- Died: 1986 (aged 80–81)
- Weight: featherweight

Boxing career

Boxing record
- Total fights: 43
- Wins: 28
- Win by KO: 6
- Losses: 9
- Draws: 6
- No contests: 0

Bryn "Ginger" Jones (1905 – December 1986) was a professional boxer from Wales. Born in Ferndale, but later based in Ammanford, Jones was notable for becoming the Welsh featherweight champion in 1929.

== Personal history ==
Jones was born to William Evan and Jane Jones in Ferndale in the industrial coal mining area of the Rhondda Valleys. His father was a collier who was also known in the area as a mountain fighter; while his mother was a housewife who looked after a large family of 12 children.

On 31 January 1932 Jones married Olive Jones, they had two children Brian and Jayne.

== Boxing career ==
Jones fought from a young age, with his father converting a downstairs room in their terraced house in New St into a gym. Two of his elder brothers were notable boxers, Harold, a bantamweight fought unsuccessfully for the British bantamweight title in 1920, while William Evan was a 1914 Army champion. Jones chose to turn professional in 1924 at the age of 19, because 'Money was short'. He had no official amateur experience, and he relied on his family's training when he started his professional training first with Will Pearson in Ferndale and the later Dai Lodwick. He took as his first manager Teddy Lewis, who set up his first contests, mainly against local opponents.

Although BoxRec states that Jones' first professional fight was on the 10 June 1928, Tony Lee in his 2009 work All in My Corner states that he began his pro career in 1924 fighting and winning bouts against the likes of Johnny Haydn and Billy Meade. His most notable fight in this early part of his career was in October 1927 against Bill Beynon, the former British bantamweight champion; although Jones took severe punishment he managed to win the contest. On 9 January 1928 former British welterweight champion Johnny Basham, a friend of the Jones family, in a meeting with boxing manager Johnny Vaughan mentioned that Vaughan should watch Ginger Jones fight. Vaughan attended Jones' next contest, against Reggie Jones at Pontypridd on 18 January, and after the fight he signed Jones up.

After Vaughan took charge of Jones he began to take on fighters at higher level events, taking on Tommy Bailey in Liverpool, and then gaining two draws at Premierland in Whitechapel against Jack Garland and Len "Tiger" Smith, both within a week in September 1929. These results were followed up with a challenge for the Welsh featherweight championship, with a match against the holder Billy Evans of Merthyr Tydfil. Jones and Evans had faced each twice before, with Evans the victor in November 1928, but Jones then won the rematch on points in January 1929. Their third contest was held at the British Legion Hall in Pentre and was scheduled for fifteen rounds. The match went the distance, with F.R. Hill of Boxing newspaper giving the early rounds to Evans, but with Jones taking control in the later stages. Jones was declared winner on a points decision, making him the Welsh champion.

== Bibliography ==
- Lee, Tony (2009). All in My Corner: A tribute to some forgotten Welsh boxing heroes. Ammanford: TL Associates. ISBN 978-0-9564456-0-5.
