= Tony Marino (boxer) =

American boxer (1910-1937)

Personal information
- Born: Anthony Marino; May 18, 1910 Duquesne, Pennsylvania, US
- Died: February 1, 1937 (aged 26) Brooklyn, New York, US
- Height: 5 ft 2 in (1.57 m)
- Weight: Bantamweight

Boxing career
- Stance: Orthodox

Boxing record
- Total fights: 44
- Wins: 28
- Win by KO: 7
- Losses: 14
- Draws: 2

Tony Marino (May 18, 1910 – February 1, 1937) was an American boxer who became the World Bantamweight Champion on June 29, 1936, when he defeated Baltasar Sangchili in a fourteenth-round knockout in New York. Marino had the famous trainer Ray Arcel and managers Reed Brown and Bill Newman. He died on February 1, 1937, of injuries he received from his bout with boxer Carlos Quintana, two days earlier in Brooklyn. On February 3, 1937, the New York State Athletic Commission, citing Marino's death, created the three-knockdown rule.

== Early life and career ==
Tony Marino was born into a large and close Italian family on May 18, 1910, in Duquesne, Pennsylvania, a suburb of Pittsburgh. Most sources list his birth year as 1912, but his headstone lists it as 1910.

His parents, Anthony and Mary, would eventually have ten children, giving Tony a total of six sisters and three brothers. His older brother Charles would take the ringname Tommy Ryan, and become an accomplished boxer himself, competing for the World Bantamweight Title in 1924.

Tony was named after his father, who eventually settled the family on South Fifth Street in Duquesne. Marino was known as a studied boxer, not a strong puncher, though he had a good left hand, and a short, but accomplished career.

According to one source, Marino fought as many as eighty bouts before becoming a professional, though many were as short as three rounds. As an amateur, Marino represented Pittsburgh at the National tournament in Boston with teammate, Teddy Yarosz, also a Pittsburgh area native. Yarosz would take the 1934 NYSAC Middleweight Championship.

He fought his first well publicized professional bout at the age of eighteen on July 2, 1930, winning in six rounds against Young Ketchell in North Braddock, Pennsylvania. He beat Ketchell again on May 20, 1932, in an eight-round unanimous decision at Stanton Park Arena in Steubenville, Ohio.

On March 14, 1932, he decisively defeated Joey Ross in an eight-round split decision at Motor Square Garden in Pittsburgh. Marino carried much of the fight with terrific combinations of rights and left hooks, but Ross finished strong, and won the last round, when Marino may have begun to fatigue. At least one reporter at ringside felt Marino had won all but the sixth and eighth rounds.

On January 21, 1932, he defeated Marty Gold at the Palisades Rink in McKeesport, Pennsylvania, in a ten-round points decision. As one of his earliest bouts with a more experienced boxer, the Pittsburgh Post, wrote that Marino had "met his hardest test, ...and survived it." He won the important and well publicized match by a unanimous decision of the judges. Marino staggered Gold with a left hook in the sixth, but was warned for low blows in the early rounds. In what was not entirely a one-sided bout, Gold knocked Marino to a sitting posture in the last round though some at ringside considered it one of Gold's few solidly landed blows.

=== First bout with Midget Wolgast ===
He fought Midget Wolgast for the first time on June 6, 1932, at the Myers Bowl in North Braddock, Pennsylvania, losing in a ten-round points decision. Wolgast had been the NYSAC World Flyweight Boxing Champion in 1930.

On October 25 and November 12, 1934, he lost to Filipino boxer Small Montana in ten round points decisions in Sacramento and San Francisco, California. A worthy opponent, in 1935, Montana would take the NYSAC World Flyweight Championship.

On April 11, 1936, he received his first of only two knockouts in his career from Willie Felice at Ridgewood Grove in Brooklyn, New York. The knockout occurred in the third round. On May 2, 1936, he showed he could avenge a dominating opponent, winning in a six-round points decision at Ridgewood Grove in New York. New York's Democrat and Chronicle considered the win "impressive".

Though weighing in six pounds lighter, on March 28, 1936, at Ridgewood Grove in Brooklyn, he defeated Johnny "Skippy" Allen in an impressive fourth-round technical knockout.

=== Win against Lou Salica ===
On June 2, 1936, he defeated Lou Salica, former NYSAC World Bantamweight Title Holder, in Queensboro Arena in New York. He surprised the crowd with an unexpected ten round points decision against the former champion. It was a victory that helped Marino rise to greater prominence.

== World Bantam Champion ==
Marino became the World Bantamweight champion on June 29, 1936, when he defeated Spanish boxer Baltasar Sangchili in a close and stunning fourteenth-round knockout in New York. Marino had been down four times in the bout and was well behind in points. In the fourteenth round Marino shot a jarring short left hook to the chin of Sangchili who thought he was close to finishing off Marino. After landing the surprise left, Marino "rammed a right to the body (of Sangchili) and then shifted his attack to the head, hooking a series of punches with both hands. Sangchili crumpled until he fell over on his face to be counted out." Many in the audience were stunned by the upset, and considered Marino a relative unknown who had fought several previous fights for as little as $40.

Marino boxed Sangchili a second time, after his loss of the Bantamweight Championship on October 15, 1936, at Motor Square Garden near his birthplace of Pittsburgh, Pennsylvania. He lost the ten round points decision.

== Loss of Bantam title ==
Only two months after taking the title, he lost it on August 31, 1936, in a thirteenth round Technical Knockout to Puerto Rican NYSAC World Bantamweight champion Sixto Escobar at Dyckman Oval in Manhattan, New York. As early as the second round, Escobar floored Marino five times for counts of three, eight, four, seven, and five. Finally, the ring physician ordered the bout halted in the thirteenth round because of facial cuts on Marino, particularly a nasty cut over his right eye which bled continuously since the fifth round. His left eye had swelling and a cut above it as well.

Marino, going out in championship style, never ceased to cautiously continue the fight before the enthusiastic crowd of 8,500, though unable to score more than a draw in any of the rounds. Escobar had a swollen lip and swelling on the left side of his face, but weathered the bout in far better shape than his opponent.

On October 31, 1936, he defeated the accomplished Nicky Jerome in an eight-round points decision in Brooklyn, New York. In one of his last fights, On December 19, 1936, he defeated Jerome again in an eight-round points decision at Ridgewood Grove in Brooklyn. One newspaper noted that "his superior boxing gave him the edge", rather than strong punching.

== Last fight and resulting death ==
On January 30, 1937, Marino fought Panamanian boxer Carlos "Indian" Quintana at the Ridgewood Grove Arena in Brooklyn, New York. He took a terrific beating and was floored five times. The bout went the scheduled distance of eight rounds. Marino collapsed in the center of the ring just as the referee raised Quintana's hand to indicate his victory. He was examined by the ringside doctor, Eugene Kenny, who diagnosed a brain concussion. He was carried to his dressing room. Shortly thereafter, he was rushed to Wyckoff Heights Hospital in Brooklyn. He never regained consciousness and died on February 1, two days after the fight. A benefit for his family was held in his honor in New York partly through the efforts of John Attell, a matchmaker who had arranged several of his fights; it netted a total of $1,212.74. Quintana headlined the card of fighters.

== Death inspires boxing rule ==
Two days after he died, the New York State Athletic Commission convened to frame a new rule. Citing Marino's death, they determined that any fighter knocked down three times in a single round would be considered "outclassed" and the fight would be stopped. At the time of its creation, this rule did not apply to championship matches. Over the years, the three-knockdown rule spread beyond the boundaries of New York, being used in many states and other countries, where it is called an "automatic knockout" by the World Boxing Association, the successor to the National Boxing Association led by NYSAC. Death of a Champion, Birth of a Rule: The Tony Marino Story, a documentary about Marino's life, death and the impact of the three-knockdown rule, was released in 2016.

== Professional boxing record ==
| 44 fights | 28 wins | 14 losses |
|---|---|---|
| By knockout | 7 | 2 |
| By decision | 21 | 12 |
| Draws | 2 | |

| No. | Result | Record | Opponent | Type | Round | Date | Location | Notes |
|---|---|---|---|---|---|---|---|---|
| 44 | Loss | 28–14–2 | Carlos Quintana | PTS | 8 | Jan 30, 1937 | Ridgewood Grove, New York City, New York, U.S. | Marino died of injuries sustained from the fight. |
| 43 | Win | 28–13–2 | Nicky Jerome | PTS | 8 | Dec 19, 1936 | Ridgewood Grove, New York City, New York, U.S. | |
| 42 | Win | 27–13–2 | Cristobal Jaramillo | PTS | 8 | Dec 9, 1936 | Hippodrome, New York City, New York, U.S. | |
| 41 | Win | 26–13–2 | Jimmy Martin | PTS | 8 | Nov 21, 1936 | Ridgewood Grove, New York City, New York, U.S. | |
| 40 | Win | 25–13–2 | Nicky Jerome | PTS | 8 | Oct 31, 1936 | Ridgewood Grove, New York City, New York, U.S. | |
| 39 | Loss | 24–13–2 | Baltasar Sangchili | PTS | 10 | Oct 15, 1936 | Motor Square Garden, Pittsburgh, Pennsylvania, U.S. | |
| 38 | Loss | 24–12–2 | Sixto Escobar | TKO | 13 (15) | Aug 31, 1936 | Dyckman Oval, New York City, New York, U.S. | Lost The Ring bantamweight title; For NBA and NYSAC bantamweight titles |
| 37 | Win | 24–11–2 | Baltasar Sangchili | KO | 14 (15) | Jun 29, 1936 | Dyckman Oval, New York City, New York, U.S. | Won The Ring bantamweight title |
| 36 | Win | 23–11–2 | Lou Salica | PTS | 10 | Jun 2, 1936 | Queensboro Arena, Long Island City, New York City, New York, U.S. | |
| 35 | Win | 22–11–2 | Santos Hugo | TKO | 4 (6) | May 16, 1936 | Ridgewood Grove, New York City, New York, U.S. | |
| 34 | Win | 21–11–2 | Willie Felice | PTS | 6 | May 2, 1936 | Ridgewood Grove, New York City, New York, U.S. | |
| 33 | Loss | 20–11–2 | Willie Felice | KO | 3 (6) | Apr 11, 1936 | Ridgewood Grove, New York City, New York, U.S. | |
| 32 | Win | 20–10–2 | Skippy Allen | TKO | 4 (6) | Mar 28, 1936 | Ridgewood Grove, New York City, New York, U.S. | |
| 31 | Win | 19–10–2 | Richard LiBrandi | PTS | 6 | Mar 14, 1936 | Ridgewood Grove, New York City, New York, U.S. | |
| 30 | Draw | 18–10–2 | Speedy Dado | PTS | 10 | Oct 22, 1935 | Memorial Auditorium, Sacramento, California, U.S. | |
| 29 | Loss | 18–10–1 | Midget Wolgast | PTS | 10 | Oct 2, 1935 | Auditorium, Oakland, California, U.S. | |
| 28 | Win | 18–9–1 | General Padilla | PTS | 8 | Aug 5, 1935 | Civic Auditorium, San Francisco, California, U.S. | |
| 27 | Loss | 17–9–1 | Young Tommy | PTS | 10 | Jul 12, 1935 | Legion Stadium, Hollywood, California, U.S. | |
| 26 | Loss | 17–8–1 | Pablo Dano | PTS | 10 | Apr 11, 1935 | Memorial Auditorium, Sacramento, California, U.S. | |
| 25 | Win | 17–7–1 | Joey Dodge | PTS | 10 | Mar 15, 1935 | Memorial Auditorium, Sacramento, California, U.S. | |
| 24 | Loss | 16–7–1 | Pablo Dano | PTS | 10 | Dec 7, 1934 | Watsonville, California, U.S. | |
| 23 | Loss | 16–6–1 | Small Montana | PTS | 10 | Nov 12, 1934 | Civic Auditorium, San Francisco, California, U.S. | |
| 22 | Loss | 16–5–1 | Small Montana | PTS | 10 | Oct 25, 1934 | L Street Arena, Sacramento, California, U.S. | |
| 21 | Win | 16–4–1 | Ray Mayo | PTS | 8 | Sep 28, 1934 | Dreamland Auditorium, San Francisco, California, U.S. | |
| 20 | Win | 15–4–1 | Bobby Olivas | TKO | 4 (10) | Sep 7, 1934 | Dreamland Auditorium, San Francisco, California, U.S. | |
| 19 | Draw | 14–4–1 | Joey Dodge | PTS | 10 | Aug 10, 1934 | Chestnut St. Arena, Reno, Nevada, U.S. | |
| 18 | Win | 14–4 | Johnny Perrine | UD | 10 | Jun 5, 1933 | Hickey Park, Millvale, Pennsylvania, U.S. | |
| 17 | Loss | 13–4 | Ernie Maurer | PTS | 6 | Nov 3, 1932 | Maple Leaf Gardens, Toronto, Ontario, Canada | |
| 16 | Loss | 13–3 | Bobby Leitham | PTS | 12 | Oct 10, 1932 | Maple Leaf Gardens, Toronto, Ontario, Canada | |
| 15 | Loss | 13–2 | Midget Wolgast | UD | 10 | Jun 6, 1932 | Meyers Bowl, North Braddock, Pennsylvania, U.S. | |
| 14 | Win | 13–1 | Young Ketchell | UD | 8 | May 20, 1932 | Stanton Park Arena, Steubenville, Ohio, U.S. | |
| 13 | Loss | 12–1 | Willie Davies | SD | 10 | Mar 31, 1932 | Palisades Rink, McKeesport, Pennsylvania, U.S. | |
| 12 | Win | 12–0 | Joey Ross | SD | 8 | Mar 14, 1932 | Motor Square Garden, Pittsburgh, Pennsylvania, U.S. | |
| 11 | Win | 11–0 | Mickey Farr | TKO | 3 (8) | Feb 15, 1932 | Motor Square Garden, Pittsburgh, Pennsylvania, U.S. | |
| 10 | Win | 10–0 | Franklyn Young | UD | 10 | Feb 11, 1932 | Palisades Rink, McKeesport, Pennsylvania, U.S. | |
| 9 | Win | 9–0 | Marty Gold | UD | 10 | Jan 21, 1932 | Palisades Rink, McKeesport, Pennsylvania, U.S. | |
| 8 | Win | 8–0 | Frisco Grande | PTS | 10 | Jan 7, 1932 | Palisades Rink, McKeesport, Pennsylvania, U.S. | |
| 7 | Win | 7–0 | Johnny Edwards | PTS | 10 | Dec 21, 1931 | Wheeling, Pennsylvania, U.S. | |
| 6 | Win | 6–0 | Tony Shea | TKO | 4 (6) | Nov 30, 1931 | Motor Square Garden, Pittsburgh, Pennsylvania, U.S. | |
| 5 | Win | 5–0 | Cleo McNeal | TKO | 1 (6) | Nov 12, 1931 | Palisades Rink, McKeesport, Pennsylvania, U.S. | |
| 4 | Win | 4–0 | George Tomasky | PTS | 6 | Oct 15, 1931 | Palisades Rink, McKeesport, Pennsylvania, U.S. | |
| 3 | Win | 3–0 | Young Ketchell | PTS | 6 | Feb 26, 1931 | Palisades Rink, McKeesport, Pennsylvania, U.S. | |
| 2 | Win | 2–0 | George Sotak | UD | 6 | Jan 8, 1931 | Palisades Rink, McKeesport, Pennsylvania, U.S. | |
| 1 | Win | 1–0 | Young Ketchell | PTS | 6 | July 2, 1930 | Meyers Bowl, North Braddock, Pennsylvania, U.S. | |

Achievements
| Preceded by Baltasar Sangchili | World Bantamweight Champion; June 29, 1936 - August 31, 1936 | Succeeded by Sixto Escobar |
Status
| Preceded by Francisco Guilledo | Latest born world champion to die February 1, 1937 – January 21, 1945 | Succeeded by Victor Perez |
