= Domenico Bernasconi =

Italian boxer

Personal information
- Nationality: Italian
- Born: 17 November 1902 Carate Lario, Italy
- Died: 31 January 1978 (aged 75)
- Weight: Bantamweight

Boxing career
- Stance: Orthodox

Boxing record
- Total fights: 72
- Wins: 44
- Win by KO: 24
- Losses: 22
- Draws: 5
- No contests: 0

Domenico Bernasconi (17 November 1902 – 31 January 1978) was an Italian professional boxer who competed from 1924 to 1935. He was a two-time EBU bantamweight champion and a one-time Italian bantamweight champion.

== 1924 Olympic results ==
Bernasconi represented Italy in the 1924 Summer Olympics. He was eliminated in the first round of the bantamweight class after losing his fight to the eventual bronze medalist Jean Ces.

- Round of 32: lost to Jean Ces (France) by decision

== Professional career ==
On 5 May 1925 Bernasconi fought Tullio Alessandri for the Italian bantamweight title, knocking him out in the fourth round. On 10 March 1929 he fought Nicolas Petit-Biquet for the vacant EBU bantamweight title, beating him on points. On 2 June 1929 Bernasconi successfully defended both the EBU bantamweight and Italian bantamweight titles against Rinaldo Castellenghi, knocking him out in the ninth round.

On 19 March 1932 Bernasconi won his second EBU bantamweight title after knocking out Lucian Popescu in the fifth round. On 19 March 1933 Bernasconi unsuccessfully fought Panama Al Brown for the IBU World bantamweight title, the match ending in a unanimous decision.
