= Warnock (surname) =

Warnock is a surname. It originated with the Mac-Gille-Warnocks (MacIlvernocks clan) in Scotland prior to 1066; its motto is "Ne oublie" (Do not forget). Notable people with the surname include:

== List of people with the surname ==
- Barbara Mills née Warnock (1940–2011), British barrister
- Barton H. Warnock (1911–1998), American botanist and taxonomist
- Bryan Warnock, originator of Warnock's dilemma
- Ceri Warnock, British-born New Zealand environmental legal scholar
- Dave Warnock (1910–1976), Scottish footballer (Aberdeen)
- David Warnock (1865–1932), Scottish-Canadian politician and veterinarian
- Diana Warnock (1940–2023), Australian radio broadcaster and politician
- Geoffrey Warnock (1923–1995), British philosopher and former Vice-Chancellor of Oxford University
- James Warnock (engineer), American engineer
- Jimmy Warnock (1912–1987), Belfast boxer who fought and beat Benny Lynch when World Champion in 1936 and again in 1937
- John Warnock (born 1940), American co-founder of Adobe Systems software company and inventor of Warnock algorithm
- Mary Warnock, Baroness Warnock (1924–2019), British philosopher and chair of committees that produced reports about education and medicine
- Matthew Warnock (born 1984), Australian rules footballer
- Neil Warnock (born 1948), English football manager
- Raphael Warnock (born 1969), American pastor and politician from Georgia
- Robert Warnock (born 1987), Australian rules footballer
- Stephen Warnock (born 1981), English footballer
- William R. Warnock (1838–1918), American politician from Ohio

== See also ==
- Warnock (disambiguation)
