= James Warnock =

James Warnock may refer to:

- James Warnock (engineer), American electrical engineer
- James Warnock (murderer) (born 1959), British murderer
- Jimmy Warnock (1912–1987), Northern Ireland boxer
