= Warnock =

Warnock may refer to:

== People ==
- Warnock (surname), for people with the surname
  - John Edward Warnock (1940–2023), American computer scientist, inventor, co-founder of Adobe Systems, Inc.
  - Raphael Warnock (born 1969), United States Senator from Georgia

== Other uses ==
- Warnock's dilemma, interpretations of a lack of response to online postings
- Warnock algorithm in computer graphics
- Warnock (typeface), a serif typeface
- Warnock, Ohio
- Warnock Islands
