= Regency Park =

Regency Park may refer to:

- Regency Park, South Australia, a suburb of Adelaide, South Australia
- Regency Park (Cary, North Carolina), United States
- Regency Park Estate, a suburb of Johannesburg, South Africa
- Regency Park Estates, Alberta, Canada
- Regency Park (Omaha), a park in Omaha, Nebraska
- Regency Park (Orlando, Florida), a neighborhood in Pensacola, Florida
