= Peter Kane =

British boxer (1918–1991)

Personal information
- Nationality: English
- Born: 28 February 1918 Heywood, Lancashire, England, UK
- Died: 23 July 1991 (aged 73)
- Weight: Flyweight and Bantamweight

Boxing career

Boxing record
- Total fights: 100
- Wins: 89
- Win by KO: 54
- Losses: 8
- Draws: 2
- No contests: 1

Peter Kane (28 February 1918 – 23 July 1991) was an English flyweight boxer and a world champion in the 1930s. Kane was born in Heywood, Lancashire, on 28 February 1918, but grew up in the town of Golborne, Lancashire, after his family moved there before his first birthday. In Golborne Peter Kane Square is named in his honour. In his day, he was known as the Golborne Blacksmith.

== Boxing style ==
He was a two-fisted fighter, renowned for his punching power. Fifty-three of his eighty-eight wins were by knockout.

== Professional career ==
He made his professional debut in December 1934, at the age of sixteen. He fought and beat Joe Jacobs in Liverpool, where he was to have many of his fights. The fight was stopped in the fifth.

He went on to record a string of forty-one consecutive wins, before challenging Benny Lynch for the World flyweight title, at the age of nineteen. The fight, in October 1937, was staged at Shawfield Park, Glasgow in front of a crowd of over 40,000. Lynch retained his title by knocking Kane out in the thirteenth round.

Kane had a re-match with Lynch in March 1938, and fought a draw over fifteen rounds in Liverpool. Lynch could not make the flyweight limit and had to pay a forfeit. In his next fight, against the American Jackie Jurich, Lynch was again overweight despite winning the fight and forfeited his World flyweight title. The British Boxing Board of Control declared the title vacant.

== World title ==
Jurich and Kane were regarded as the chief contenders for the vacant world flyweight title, and a fight was arranged between them in September 1938, in Liverpool. Kane won on points after putting Jurich down five times during the fight.

He was now world flyweight champion, but he was finding it increasingly difficult to get down to the flyweight limit. In 1939, Kane announced that he was going to fight as a bantamweight in future, and at the end of that year, the National Boxing Association of America stripped him of his title. He continued to be recognised as world flyweight champion by the International Boxing Union, in Europe.

Kane continued to fight recording a string of victories with only the occasional defeat, but most of his fights were at bantamweight. Although he was the world flyweight champion, the British and Commonwealth titles were held by the Scotsman Jackie Paterson. In June 1943, a fight was arranged at Hampden Park, Glasgow, with all three titles at stake. Kane managed to make the flyweight limit for the fight but was knocked out in the first round. The fight lasted 61 seconds.

== Subsequent career ==
Kane continued to fight but concentrated on the bantamweight division from now on, again winning most of his fights. In September 1947, he fought the Frenchman Theo Medina for the European bantamweight title, at Belle Vue, Manchester. Kane won on points to become European bantamweight champion.

In December 1947, he defended the title against the Belgian Joe Cornelis, again at Belle Vue, and again won on points. In February 1948, he defended his European title against the Italian Guido Ferracin, again at Belle Vue, and this time lost on points. He had a re-match with Ferracin in July 1948, at Belle Vue again. This time Kane was forced to retire in round five. He had only three more fights, losing on points to Stan Rowan in November 1948 and to Arthur Garrett in January 1950, and knocking out Johnny Conn, who was making his debut, in April 1951.

== Retirement ==
He worked throughout his career as a blacksmith in the village of Lowton, which neighbours Golborne. Throughout his adult life and boxing career, he lived on Lowton Road, Golborne, the main road between Lowton and Golborne, (except when he lived at 211 Liverpool Road, Pewfall). He died on 23 July 1991, aged 73.

== Professional boxing record ==
100 fights	89 wins	8 losses
By knockout	54	5
By decision	34	3
By disqualification	1	0
Draws	2	
No contests	1	

No.	Result	Record	Opponent	Type	Round(s)	Date	Location	Notes
100	Win	89–8–2 (1)	Johnny Conn	KO	3 (10)	Apr 23, 1951	Barrow In Furness, Cumbria, England, U.K.	
99	Loss	88–8–2 (1)	Stan Rowan	PTS	12	Nov 19, 1948	King's Hall, Belle Vue, Manchester, Lancashire, England, U.K.	
98	Loss	88–7–2 (1)	Guido Ferracin	RTD	5 (15)	Jul 16, 1948	King's Hall, Belle Vue, Manchester, Lancashire, England, U.K.	For IBU bantamweight title
97	Draw	88–6–2 (1)	Amleto Falcinelli	PTS	10	May 26, 1948	Ice Rink, Paisley, Scotland, U.K.	
96	Win	88–6–1 (1)	Bunty Doran	TKO	8 (10)	Apr 16, 1948	King's Hall, Belle Vue, Manchester, Lancashire, England, U.K.	
95	Loss	87–6–1 (1)	Guido Ferracin	PTS	15	Feb 20, 1948	King's Hall, Belle Vue, Manchester, Lancashire, England, U.K.	Lost IBU bantamweight title
94	Win	87–5–1 (1)	Sammy Reynolds	PTS	10	Jan 26, 1948	Ice Rink, Nottingham, Nottinghamshire, England, U.K.	
93	Win	86–5–1 (1)	Joseph Cornelis	PTS	15	Dec 15, 1947	King's Hall, Belle Vue, Manchester, Lancashire, England, U.K.	Retained IBU bantamweight title
92	Win	85–5–1 (1)	Theo Medina	PTS	15	Sep 19, 1947	King's Hall, Belle Vue, Manchester, Lancashire, England, U.K.	Won vacant IBU bantamweight title
91	Win	84–5–1 (1)	Dado Marino	PTS	10	Aug 8, 1947	King's Hall, Belle Vue, Manchester, Lancashire, England, U.K.	
90	Win	83–5–1 (1)	Albert Braedt	KO	3 (10)	Jun 27, 1947	Tower Theatre, New Brighton, Merseyside, England, U.K.	
89	Win	82–5–1 (1)	Theo Medina	TKO	6 (10)	Jun 9, 1947	King's Hall, Belle Vue, Manchester, Lancashire, England, U.K.	
88	Win	81–5–1 (1)	Len Coffin	TKO	7 (8)	May 19, 1947	Town Hall, Leeds, Yorkshire, England, U.K.	
87	Win	80–5–1 (1)	Joseph Cornelis	PTS	10	Apr 28, 1947	King's Hall, Belle Vue, Manchester, Lancashire, England, U.K.	
86	Win	79–5–1 (1)	Bunty Doran	PTS	8	Feb 10, 1947	King's Hall, Belle Vue, Manchester, Lancashire, England, U.K.	
85	Win	78–5–1 (1)	Tommy Madine	KO	4 (10)	Jan 6, 1947	Victoria Baths, Nottingham, Nottinghamshire, England, U.K.	
84	Win	77–5–1 (1)	Jean Jouas	PTS	10	Nov 18, 1946	Palais des Sports, Paris, Paris, France	
83	Win	76–5–1 (1)	Norman Lewis	KO	5 (8)	Oct 28, 1946	Royal Albert Hall, Kensington, London, England, U.K.	
82	Win	75–5–1 (1)	Ron Bissell	TKO	2 (8)	Sep 4, 1946	Ninian Park, Cardiff, Wales, U.K.	
81	Win	74–5–1 (1)	Jackie Hughes	DQ	5 (8)	Aug 13, 1946	Withdean Stadium, Brighton, Sussex, England, U.K.	Hughes DQ'd for holding
80	Win	73–5–1 (1)	Jim Brady	PTS	10	Nov 3, 1943	Queensberry Club, Soho, London, England, U.K.	
79	Win	72–5–1 (1)	Sammy Reynolds	PTS	10	Oct 13, 1943	Queensberry Club, Soho, London, England, U.K.	
78	Win	71–5–1 (1)	Johnny Summers	KO	1 (10)	Oct 11, 1943	Colston Hall, Bristol, Avon, England, U.K.	
77	Loss	70–5–1 (1)	Jackie Paterson	KO	1 (15)	Jun 19, 1943	Hampden Park, Glasgow, Scotland, U.K.	Lost NBA and Lonsdale flyweight titles; For vacant The Ring flyweight titles
76	Win	70–4–1 (1)	Gus Foran	PTS	10	Mar 26, 1943	Tower Circus, Blackpool, Lancashire, England, U.K.	
75	NC	69–4–1 (1)	Willie Grey	NC	5 (10)	Feb 23, 1943	Queensberry Club, Soho, London, England, U.K.	
74	Win	69–4–1	Willie Grey	PTS	10	Jan 14, 1943	The Stadium, Liverpool, Merseyside, England, U.K.	
73	Win	68–4–1	Paddy Ryan	TKO	6 (12)	Oct 29, 1942	The Stadium, Liverpool, Merseyside, England, U.K.	Retained world flyweight title; Won BBBofC Northern Area flyweight title
72	Win	67–4–1	Frankie Kid Bonsor	TKO	3 (10)	Oct 1, 1942	The Stadium, Liverpool, Merseyside, England, U.K.	
71	Win	66–4–1	Hugh Cameron	PTS	10	Sep 10, 1942	The Stadium, Liverpool, Merseyside, England, U.K.	
70	Win	65–4–1	Joe Curran	KO	11 (15)	Aug 3, 1942	Anfield Football Ground, Liverpool, Merseyside, England, U.K.	Retained world flyweight title
69	Win	64–4–1	Sammy Reynolds	PTS	8	Jul 11, 1942	Wolverhampton Wanderer's F.C. Ground, Wolverhampton, West Midlands, England, U.K.	
68	Win	63–4–1	Norman Lewis	PTS	10	Jul 8, 1942	Edmund Rd Drill Hall, Sheffield, Yorkshire, England, U.K.	
67	Win	62–4–1	Sammy Reynolds	PTS	10	May 31, 1942	The Stadium, Liverpool, Merseyside, England, U.K.	
66	Win	61–4–1	Joe Curran	PTS	10	Apr 26, 1942	The Stadium, Liverpool, Merseyside, England, U.K.	
65	Win	60–4–1	Eddie Petrin	KO	7 (10)	Apr 18, 1942	Colston Hall, Bristol, Avon, England, U.K.	
64	Win	59–4–1	Willie Grey	TKO	6 (10)	Mar 30, 1942	Royal Albert Hall, Kensington, London, England, U.K.	
63	Win	58–4–1	Jimmy Stubbs	PTS	10	Dec 14, 1941	The Stadium, Liverpool, Merseyside, England, U.K.	
62	Win	57–4–1	Tommy McGlinchey	KO	2 (10)	Nov 16, 1941	The Stadium, Liverpool, Merseyside, England, U.K.	
61	Win	56–4–1	Jimmy Stubbs	TKO	7 (10)	Jun 29, 1941	The Stadium, Liverpool, Merseyside, England, U.K.	
60	Loss	55–4–1	Jimmy Lydon	PTS	10	Mar 3, 1941	The Stadium, Liverpool, Merseyside, England, U.K.	
59	Win	55–3–1	Teddy O'Neill	PTS	6	Feb 20, 1941	Odeon Theatre, Leicester Square, London, England, U.K.	
58	Loss	54–3–1	Teddy O'Neill	KO	2 (10)	Oct 3, 1940	Central Pier, Morecambe, Lancashire, England, U.K.	
57	Win	54–2–1	Battling Jim Hayes	PTS	10	Apr 4, 1940	The Stadium, Liverpool, Merseyside, England, U.K.	
56	Loss	53–2–1	Jackie Rankin	TKO	6 (10)	Feb 12, 1940	Empress Hall, Earl's Court, London, England, U.K.	
55	Win	53–1–1	Pierre Louis	KO	3 (10)	Aug 5, 1939	Stade Louis II, Fontvieille, Monaco	
54	Win	52–1–1	Joseph El Houssine	PTS	10	May 22, 1939	Palais des Sports, Paris, Paris, France	
53	Win	51–1–1	Albert Legrand	KO	8 (10)	Apr 27, 1939	Royal Albert Hall, Kensington, London, England, U.K.	
52	Win	50–1–1	Baltasar Sangchili	PTS	10	Apr 3, 1939	Earls Court Empress Hall, Kensington, London, England, U.K.	
51	Win	49–1–1	Gino Cattaneo	PTS	10	Feb 23, 1939	The Stadium, Liverpool, Merseyside, England, U.K.	
50	Win	48–1–1	Raoul Degryse	PTS	10	Jan 31, 1939	Granby Halls, Leicester, Leicestershire, England, U.K.	
49	Win	47–1–1	Jackie Jurich	PTS	15	Sep 22, 1938	Anfield Football Ground, Liverpool, Merseyside, England, U.K.	Won vacant NBA and The Ring flyweight titles
48	Win	46–1–1	Bernard Leroux	PTS	12	Jun 2, 1938	The Stadium, Liverpool, Merseyside, England, U.K.	
47	Win	45–1–1	Georges Bataille	KO	2 (12)	May 3, 1938	The Stadium, Liverpool, Merseyside, England, U.K.	
46	Draw	44–1–1	Benny Lynch	PTS	12	Mar 24, 1938	Anfield Football Ground, Liverpool, Merseyside, England, U.K.	
45	Win	44–1	Georges Bataille	PTS	10	Feb 24, 1938	Salle Wagram, Paris, Paris, France	
44	Win	43–1	Hubert Offermanns	KO	10 (12)	Feb 3, 1938	The Stadium, Liverpool, Merseyside, England, U.K.	
43	Loss	42–1	Benny Lynch	KO	13 (15)	Oct 13, 1937	Shawfield Park, Glasgow, Scotland, U.K.	For NYSAC, NBA, Lonsdale, and The Ring flyweight titles
42	Win	42–0	Jimmy Warnock	TKO	4 (15)	Aug 26, 1937	Anfield Football Ground, Liverpool, Merseyside, England, U.K.	
41	Win	41–0	Nicolas Petit Biquet	RTD	9 (15)	Jun 28, 1937	Earls Court Empress Hall, Kensington, London, England, U.K.	
40	Win	40–0	Maurice Huguenin	KO	1 (12)	Jun 17, 1937	The Stadium, Liverpool, Merseyside, England, U.K.	
39	Win	39–0	Ernst Weiss	PTS	12	May 27, 1937	Harringay Arena, Harringay, London, England, U.K.	
38	Win	38–0	Phil Milligan	KO	11 (15)	Apr 29, 1937	Anfield Football Ground, Liverpool, Merseyside, England, U.K.	Won vacant BBBofC Northern Area flyweight title
37	Win	37–0	Joseph Decico	KO	1 (10)	Apr 3, 1937	Palais des Sports, Paris, Paris, France	
36	Win	36–0	Fortunato Ortega	PTS	12	Mar 18, 1937	Anfield Football Ground, Liverpool, Merseyside, England, U.K.	
35	Win	35–0	Pierre Louis	KO	7 (10)	Mar 1, 1937	Palais des Sports, Paris, Paris, France	
34	Win	34–0	Paul Schaefer	KO	1 (12)	Feb 18, 1937	The Stadium, Liverpool, Merseyside, England, U.K.	
33	Win	33–0	Valentin Angelmann	PTS	12	Jan 18, 1937	Palais des Sports, Paris, Paris, France	
32	Win	32–0	Albert Hopp	KO	2 (9)	Dec 17, 1936	The Stadium, Liverpool, Merseyside, England, U.K.	
31	Win	31–0	Gaston Van den Bos	TKO	6 (12)	Dec 14, 1936	Earls Court Empress Hall, Kensington, London, England, U.K.	
30	Win	30–0	Eugène Huat	TKO	7 (12)	Nov 23, 1936	Earls Court Arena, Kensington, London, England, U.K.	
29	Win	29–0	Valentin Angelmann	PTS	12	Nov 12, 1936	The Stadium, Liverpool, Merseyside, England, U.K.	
28	Win	28–0	Pat Warburton	KO	1 (10)	Nov 2, 1936	NSC, Earls Court Empress Stadium, Kensington, London, England, U.K.	
27	Win	27–0	Pedro Ruiz	KO	7 (10)	Oct 22, 1936	The Stadium, Liverpool, Merseyside, England, U.K.	
26	Win	26–0	Willie McCamley	PTS	10	Sep 16, 1936	Shawfield Park, Glasgow, Scotland, U.K.	
25	Win	25–0	Ernst Weiss	PTS	12	Sep 3, 1936	The Stadium, Liverpool, Merseyside, England, U.K.	
24	Win	24–0	Tommy Stewart	TKO	10 (10)	Aug 27, 1936	Ulster Hall, Belfast, Northern Ireland, U.K.	
23	Win	23–0	Enrico Urbinati	KO	8 (10)	Aug 13, 1936	The Stadium, Liverpool, Merseyside, England, U.K.	
22	Win	22–0	Jim Maharg	RTD	3 (10)	Jun 30, 1936	Cathkin Park, Glasgow, Scotland, U.K.	
21	Win	21–0	Cyclone Kelly	KO	4 (10)	Jun 21, 1936	Junction Stadium, Manchester, Lancashire, England, U.K.	
20	Win	20–0	Herbie Hill	KO	2 (10)	Jun 11, 1936	The Stadium, Liverpool, England, U.K.	
19	Win	19–0	Jim Laird	RTD	3 (10)	May 21, 1936	The Stadium, Liverpool, England, U.K.	
18	Win	18–0	Praxille Gydé	KO	3 (10)	May 6, 1936	Anfield Football Ground, Liverpool, England, U.K.	
17	Win	17–0	Willie Smith	KO	4 (8)	Apr 24, 1936	The Stadium, Liverpool, Merseyside, England, U.K.	
16	Win	16–0	Tiny Bostock	PTS	10	Feb 14, 1936	Tower Circus, Blackpool, Lancashire, England, U.K.	
15	Win	15–0	Joe Curran	PTS	10	Jan 24, 1936	Baths Hall, Warrington, Cheshire, England, U.K.	
14	Win	14–0	Young Ash	TKO	8 (10)	Dec 20, 1935	Baths Hall, Warrington, Cheshire, England, U.K.	Date unsure
13	Win	13–0	Clarrie Gill	RTD	4 (8)	Dec 5, 1935	The Stadium, Liverpool, Merseyside, England, U.K.	
12	Win	12–0	Jackie Forshaw	KO	1 (8)	Nov 7, 1935	The Stadium, Liverpool, Merseyside, England, U.K.	
11	Win	11–0	Billy Charnock	KO	2 (8)	Oct 10, 1935	The Stadium, Liverpool, Merseyside, England, U.K.	
10	Win	10–0	Charlie Reed	KO	3 (8)	Sep 12, 1935	The Stadium, Liverpool, Merseyside, England, U.K.	
9	Win	9–0	Jackie Shea	KO	2 (8)	Jul 25, 1935	Anfield Football Ground, Liverpool, Merseyside, England, U.K.	
8	Win	8–0	Frankie Kid Bonsor	KO	4 (8)	Jul 11, 1935	The Stadium, Liverpool, Merseyside, England, U.K.	
7	Win	7–0	Billy Charnock	KO	2 (8)	Jun 27, 1935	Anfield Football Ground, Liverpool, England, U.K.	
6	Win	6–0	Jackie Burns	KO	1 (8)	May 30, 1935	The Stadium, Liverpool, Merseyside, England, U.K.	
5	Win	5–0	Bobby Doyle	KO	6 (8)	May 2, 1935	The Stadium, Liverpool, Merseyside, England, U.K.	
4	Win	4–0	Nipper Carroll	KO	3 (6)	Mar 28, 1935	The Stadium, Liverpool, Merseyside, England, U.K.	
3	Win	3–0	Charlie Powell	KO	2 (6)	Mar 14, 1935	The Stadium, Liverpool, Merseyside, England, U.K.	
2	Win	2–0	Kid Patterson	KO	3 (6)	Feb 14, 1935	The Stadium, Liverpool, Merseyside, England, U.K.	
1	Win	1–0	Joe Jacobs	TKO	5 (6)	Dec 13, 1934	The Stadium, Liverpool, Merseyside, England, U.K.	

== See also ==
- List of flyweight boxing champions

Achievements
Preceded by Benny Lynch	World flyweight champion 22 September 1938 – 19 June 1943	Succeeded by Jackie Paterson
