= Aurel Toma =

Romanian boxer

Personal information
- Nickname: Fear of Champions
- Nationality: Romanian
- Born: July 30, 1911 Babadag, Tulcea County, Sud-Est (development region), Romania
- Died: August 25, 1980 (aged 69) Oxnard, California, U.S.
- Height: 1.63 m (5 ft 4 in)
- Weight: Flyweight; Bantamweight; Featherweight

Boxing career
- Stance: Orthodox

Boxing record
- Total fights: 74
- Wins: 47
- Win by KO: 15
- Losses: 16
- Draws: 11

Aurel Toma (July 30, 1911 – August 25, 1980) was a Romanian professional boxer of Bulgarian origin who competed from 1931 to 1948.

== Career ==
He held the European bantamweight title twice, firstly in 1936 and again from 1938 to 1939. After he won the first bantamweight title in 1936, Toma was decorated by king Carol II of Romania of whom for a while he was a personal driver and a boxing teacher of his son, Prince Michael. Toma was the only boxer to knock out Benny Lynch. He is buried at the Riverside National Cemetery, in Riverside, California. A sports hall in Babadag, Romania is named after him.

== Professional boxing record ==
47 Wins (15 knockouts, 31 decisions, 1 disqualification), 16 Losses (7 knockouts, 9 decisions), 11 Draws
Result	Record	Opponent	Type	Round	Date	Location	Notes
Loss	13-1-5	(United States) Henry Davis	KO	6 (8)	1948-04-13	Civic Auditorium, Honolulu, Hawaii, United States	
Draw	12-3-1	(United States) Tsuneshi Maruo	PTS	8 (8)	1948-03-16	Civic Auditorium, Honolulu, Hawaii, United States	
Loss	27-6	(United States) Manny Ortega	KO	6 (10)	1948-02-27	Liberty Hall, El Paso, Texas, United States	
Loss	53-26-7	(Mexico) Luis Castillo	KO	6 (10)	1947-12-02	Auditorium, Portland, Oregon, United States	
Win	12-9-7	(United States) Joey Clemo	MD	10 (10)	1947-11-07	Auditorium, Portland, Oregon, United States	
Win	11-4-4	(Canada) Jackie Turner	UD	10 (10)	1947-10-21	Auditorium, Portland, Oregon, United States	
Loss	43-9-3	(United States) Joey Dolan	SD	10 (10)	1947-10-14	Armory, Spokane, Washington, United States	
Win	14-29-6	(United States) Joe Tambe	KO	2 (8)	1947-09-23	Ryan's Auditorium, Fresno, California, United States	
Win	41-7-3	(United States) Joey Dolan	PTS	10 (10)	1947-03-11	Civic Auditorium, Seattle, Washington, United States	
Win	9-8-6	(United States) Joey Clemo	PTS	10 (10)	1947-02-21	Auditorium, Portland, Oregon, United States	
Loss	40-7-11	(United States) Tony Olivera	PTS	10 (10)	1942-07-13	Coliseum Bowl, San Francisco, California, United States	
Loss	11-1	(United States) Bobby Carroll	TKO	9 (10)	1942-02-02	Sacramento, California, United States	
Draw	39-4-9	(United States) Tony Olivera	PTS	10 (10)	1941-09-19	Civic Auditorium, San Francisco, California, United States	
Win	51-10-8	(United States) Jackie Jurich	PTS	10 (10)	1941-08-25	Civic Auditorium, San Francisco, California, United States	
Win	21-18-10	(United States) Adolph Samuels	PTS	6 (6)	1941-05-16	Legion Stadium, Hollywood, California, United States	
Win	34-9-7	(United States) Bobby Siegel	PTS	6 (6)	1941-04-04	Legion Stadium, Hollywood, California, United States	
Win	5-11-9	(United States) Nat Corum	PTS	6 (6)	1941-03-14	Legion Stadium, Hollywood, California, United States	
Loss	19-0	(United States) Bill Speary	TKO	5 (8)	1940-12-09	Arena, Philadelphia, Pennsylvania, United States	
Loss	40-19-8	(Italy) Vince Dell'Orto	TKO	4 (8)	1940-11-11	St. Nicholas Arena, New York, United States	A deep cut over Toma's left eye, forced the stoppage.
Win	114-52-39	(Philippines) Pablo Dano	PTS	10 (10)	1940-11-07	Savannah, Georgia, United States	
Win	37-20-4	(Canada) Jackie Callura	PTS	10 (10)	1940-05-29	Auditorium, Oakland, California, United States	
Draw	30-2-8	(United States) Tony Olivera	PTS	10 (10)	1940-05-17	Legion Stadium, Hollywood, California, United States	
Loss	46-11-13	(United States) Chick Delaney	PTS	10 (10)	1940-04-17	Auditorium, Oakland, California, United States	Toma was knocked down three times.
Win	15-0-2	(United States) Tommy Kiene	TKO	3 (10)	1940-03-28	Savannah, Georgia, United States	
Loss	112-45-33	(Philippines) Pablo Dano	PTS	10 (10)	1940-01-23	Broadway Arena, Brooklyn, New York, United States	
Draw	112-45-32	(Philippines) Pablo Dano	PTS	8 (8)	1940-01-02	Broadway Arena, Brooklyn, New York, United States	
Win	33-24-6	(United States) Nicky Jerome	TKO	6 (8)	1939-12-19	Broadway Arena, Brooklyn, New York, United States	After the first three rounds were even Toma "won easily the rest of the way"--the bout being stopped as the bell ending the 6th round sounded.
Win	11-11-3	(Puerto Rico) Victor Corchado	PTS	8 (8)	1939-11-25	Rockland Palace, New York, United States	
Loss	41-16-7	(Austria) Ernst Weiss	RTD	11 (15)	1939-08-11	Sportpalast, Schöneberg, Berlin, Germany	For EBU (European) bantamweight title.
Loss	34-25-5	(United Kingdom) Tommy Burns	PTS	10 (10)	1939-03-24	Orange Halls, Bellshill, United Kingdom	
Win	30-14-7	(United Kingdom) Teddy O'Neill	KO	10 (10)	1939-01-27	Edinburgh, Scotland, United Kingdom	
Win	94-26-3	(United Kingdom) Len Hampston	RTD	5 (10)	1938-11-14	National Sporting Club, London, United Kingdom	
Win	88-13-17	(United Kingdom) Benny Lynch	KO	3 (10)	1938-10-03	National Sporting Club, London, United Kingdom	
Win	45-15-8	(Italy) Gino Cattaneo	DQ	8 (12)	1938-06-04	Stadionul Venus, Bucharest, Romania	Won vacant EBU (European) bantamweight title. 20,000 spectators.
Win	50-19-12	(France) Joseph Decico	PTS	10 (10)	1938-03-31	Salle Wagram, Paris, France	
Win	74-25-10	(France) Maurice Huguenin	KO	2 (10)	1938-03-16	Élysée Montmartre, Paris, France	
Win	51-11-6	(France) Gaston Maton	KO	2 (10)	1938-02-10	Salle Wagram, Paris, France	
Win	35-19-8	(United Kingdom) Jim Brady	PTS	10 (10)	1937-12-13	Earls Court Arena, Kensington, United Kingdom	
Win	2-3-3	(United Kingdom) Johnny McManus	KO	9 (10)	1937-11-29	Harringay Arena, Harringay, United Kingdom	
Draw	34-19-7	(United Kingdom) Jim Brady	PTS	10 (10)	1937-11-15	Earls Court Empress Hall, Kensington, United Kingdom	
Win	90-24-15	(Tunisia) Victor Perez	RTD	6 (10)	1937-10-03	Bucharest, Romania	
Win	22-10-4	(Romania) Ion Sandu	PTS	12 (12)	1937-08-31	Bucharest, Romania	Won Romanian bantamweight title.
Win	36-11-3	(United States) Joey Archibald	PTS	8 (8)	1937-04-05	Madison Square Garden, New York, United States	18,000 spectators.
Win	17-20-7	(United States) Jimmy Martin	TKO	5 (8)	1937-03-16	Broadway Arena, Brooklyn, New York, United States	
Win	95-38-12	(United States) Henry Hook	PTS	10 (10)	1937-02-2	Broadway Arena, Brooklyn, New York, United States	
Win	10-4-1	(United States) Richard LiBrandi	TKO	6 (10)	1937-01-26	Broadway Arena, Brooklyn, New York, United States	
Win	40-17-7	(France) Georges Bataille	PTS	10 (10)	1936-11-26	Salle Wagram, Paris, France	
Win	16-21-8	(France) Eugene Lorenzoni	KO	7 (10)	1936-10-27	Central Sporting Club, Paris, France	
Win	43-12-9	(France) Joseph Decico	KO	11 (12)	1936-07-26	Stadionul Venus, Bucharest, Romania	Won vacant EBU (European) bantamweight title. 20,000 spectators.
Win	66-12-7	(France) Valentin Angelmann	PTS	10 (10)	1936-04-09	Salle Wagram, Paris, France	
Win	30-0-3	(Italy) Roger Cotti	PTS	10 (10)	1936-03-19	Ring de Pantin, Le Mans, France	
Win	65-32-6	(France) Eugène Huat	PTS	10 (10)	1936-03-06	Élysée Montmartre, Paris, France	
Win	103-15-13	(France) Émile Pladner	PTS	10 (10)	1936-01-28	Central Sporting Club, Paris, France	
Win	83-21-13	(Tunisia) Victor Perez	PTS	10 (10)	1935-12-31	Central Sporting Club, Paris, France	
Win	28-39-21	(France) Henri Barras	PTS	10 (10)	1935-12-10	Central Sporting Club, Paris, France	
Win	29-17-9	(France) Henri Sanchez	PTS	10 (10)	1935-11-30	Central Sporting Club, Paris, France	
Loss	0-1	(Romania) Gheorghe Popescu	PTS	10 (10)	1935-10-27	Ploiești, Romania	For Romanian featherweight title.
Draw	49-50-12	(Belgium) Frans Machtens	PTS	10 (10)	1935-09-28	Arenele Romane, Bucharest, Romania	
Win	39-7-7	(Romania) Lucian Popescu	PTS	10 (10)	1935-05-15	Arenele Romane, Bucharest, Romania	
Win	2-3-2	(Romania) Ion Gurun	PTS	10 (10)	1934-12-06	Bucharest, Romania	
Draw	2-2-2	(Romania) Gheorghe Rapeanu	PTS	6 (6)	1934-07-21	Arenele Romane, Bucharest, Romania	
Loss	68-14-5	(United Kingdom) Jackie Brown	PTS	12 (12)	1934-04-16	Kings Hall, Manchester, United Kingdom	
Loss	26-23-18	(France) Maurice Filhol	PTS	10 (10)	1934-02-17	Central Sporting Club, Paris, France	
Win	19-19-14	(France) Étienne Mura	PTS	10 (10)	1934-01-23	Central Sporting Club, Paris, France	
Win	24-10-5	(France) Henri Sanchez	PTS	10 (10)	1934-01-06	Central Sporting Club, Paris, France	
Loss	40-10-6	(France) Maurice Huguenin	PTS	10 (10)	1933-12-16	Central Sporting Club, Paris, France	
Draw	0-1-1	(Romania) Ion Gurun	PTS	10 (10)	1933-06-17	Arenele Romane, Bucharest, Romania	
Draw	33-17-18	(Philippines) Joe Mediola	PTS	8 (8)	1932-12-21	Paris-Ring, Paris, France	
Draw	0-1	(Romania) Ion Gurun	PTS	8 (8)	1932-11-05	Coloseum, Bucharest, Romania	
Win	0-2-1	(Romania) Gheoghe Begheș	PTS	8 (8)	1932-10-26	Sala Constructori, Bucharest, Romania	Won Romanian flyweight title.
Win	38-28-14	(France) Rene Chalange	PTS	10 (10)	1932-08-09	Bucharest, Romania	
Win	0-0-1	(Romania) Nicolae Stamate	RTD	8 (10)	1932-07-23	Arenele Romane, Bucharest, Romania	
Win	0-0	(Romania) Ion Gurun	PTS	6 (6)	1932-06-18	Arenele Romane, Bucharest, Romania	
Draw	0-1	(Romania) Gheoghe Begheș	PTS	6 (6)	1931-06-13	Cinema Aurora-Calea Dudești, Bucharest, Romania	
