= Otávio =

Otávio is a Portuguese masculine given name, the equivalent of English Octavian, Octavius or Italian Ottavio. The Portuguese long form Octávio occurs more rarely. The Portuguese diminutive form is Otavinho.

== Given name ==
- Otávio (footballer, born 1994), Otávio Henrique Passos Santos, Brazilian football defensive midfielder for Atlético Mineiro
- Otávio (footballer, born 1995), Otávio Edmilson da Silva Monteiro, Portuguese football attacking midfielder for Al-Qadsiah
- Otávio (footballer, born 2002), Otávio Ataide da Silva, Brazil football centre-back for Paris FC
- Otávio (footballer, born November 2005), Otávio Manoel Galdino Fernandes, Brazilian football centre-back for Eintracht Frankfurt
- Otávio (footballer, born December 2005), Otávio Eleodoro Rezende Costa, Brazilian football goalkeeper for Cruzeiro
- Otávio Augusto (born 1945), Brazilian actor
- Otávio Braga (born 1973), Brazilian footballer
- Otávio de Faria (1908–1980), Brazilian journalist and writer
- Otávio Della (born 1969), Brazilian tennis player
- Otávio Dutra (born 1983), Brazilian footballer (Gresik United in Indonesia)
- Otávio Frias Filho (1957–2018), Brazilian editor of Folha de S.Paulo
- Otávio Good, American computer programmer and CEO of Quest Visual Inc.
- Otávio Fantoni (1907–1935), Brazilian footballer
- Otávio Jordão da Silva (died 2013), Brazilian amateur football referee who fatally stabbed a player during a match and then was killed by the player's relatives
- Otávio Juliano (born 1972), Brazilian filmmaker
- Otávio Müller (born 1965), Brazilian actor
- Otávio Sousa, Brazilian Jiu Jitsu competitor
- Otávio Gabus Mendes (1906–1946), Brazilian film critic
- José Otávio, Brazilian bodyboarder
- Lucas Otávio (born 1994), Brazilian footballer
- Luiz Otávio Santos de Araújo, "Tinga" (born 1990), Brazilian footballer
- Mitsuyo Maeda (1878–1941), Brazilian naturalized as Otávio Maeda, Japanese judōka and prizefighter
- Murilo Otávio Mendes (born 1995), Brazilian footballer who plays for S.C. Olhanense
- Nathan Otávio Ribeiro (born 1990), known simply as Nathan, naturalized Qatari footballer who plays for Al Rayyan in Qatar

== See also ==
- Octavio, a variation of the name Otávio
