= Benny Lynch =

Scottish boxer (1913–1946)

Personal information
- Nickname: Our Benny
- Nationality: Scottish
- Born: Benjamin Lynch; 2 April 1913 Gorbals, Glasgow, Scotland
- Died: 6 August 1946 (aged 33) Govan, Scotland
- Height: 5 ft 4 in (1.63 m)
- Weight: Flyweight

Boxing career
- Reach: 65 in (165 cm)
- Stance: Orthodox

Boxing record
- Total fights: 119
- Wins: 88
- Win by KO: 34
- Losses: 14
- Draws: 17

Benjamin Lynch (2 April 1913 – 6 August 1946), known as Our Benny, was a Scottish professional boxer who fought in the flyweight division. He is considered by some to be one of the finest boxers below the lightweight division in his era and has been described as the greatest fighter Scotland ever produced. The Ring Magazine founder Nat Fleischer rated Lynch as the No. 5 flyweight of all-time while his publication placed him 63rd in its 2002 list of the "Best Fighters of the Last 80 Years". Like Fleischer, both Statistical boxing website BoxRec and the International Boxing Research Organization also rank Lynch as the 5th greatest flyweight ever. He was elected to the Ring Magazine hall of fame in 1986 and the International Boxing Hall of Fame in 1998.

== Life and career ==
He was born in a tenement flat at 17 Florence Street, in the Gorbals area of Glasgow, and learned his fighting skills in the carnival booths that were popular in the west of Scotland during the Great Depression.

=== Early professional fights ===
Lynch made his professional debut in April 1931 with a second round stoppage of Young Bryce. His professional career started inauspiciously, winning only 8 of his first 15 fights. His first significant victory came in June 1932, when he beat the experienced Jock Joe Aitken on points.

In March 1933 he began an unbeaten run that would last three years. He beat Bert Kirby on points in October 1933, and in January 1934 beat Jim Brady in an eliminator for the Scottish Area flyweight title, beating Jim Campbell in May to take the title. He successfully defended the title against Campbell a month later. Lynch rounded off the year with further wins over opponents including Maurice Huguenin, Jim Brady, Valentin Angelmann, and Pedro Ruiz.

=== British and European flyweight champion ===
Lynch won the British, European and world flyweight titles from Jackie Brown in an historic bout held in Manchester on 9 September 1935, the two having fought a draw six months earlier. The fight attracted enormous support from Glaswegians who travelled en masse to watch Lynch floor his opponent eight times before the bout was stopped in the second round.

In his next three fights he beat Gaston Maton (but had to pay a forfeit after failing to make the weight), Harry Orton, and Phil Milligan, before suffering his first defeat in three years when he lost on points to Jimmy Warnock in Belfast in March 1936.

In September 1936 he successfully defended his British and European titles against Pat Palmer, stopping the Londoner in the eighth round.

In November 1936, Lynch was sued for £2,000 by his former manager Samuel Wilson, for alleged breach of contract; Lynch counter-sued, alleging that Wilson had not carried out his duties properly.

=== World flyweight champion ===
There was dispute, on at least on one side of the Atlantic, as to who was the genuine world flyweight champion. Lynch, recognised as champion in Britain, settled the matter when he out-pointed NBA and NYSAC flyweight champion Filipino Small Montana in London in January 1937 to establish himself as the undisputed world flyweight boxing champion.

In his next fight he beat Spanish flyweight champion Fortunato Ortega on points. In March he was disqualified against Len Hampston when his second entered the ring. The two met again three weeks later, with Lynch winning via a tenth round stoppage. In June he was again beaten by Warnock in a fight for which he failed to make the weight.

In October 1937 he handed Peter Kane his first loss by knockout in a defence of his British and world titles. One of his training sessions before the fight had attracted 10,000 spectators. Towards the end of the month he was knocked unconscious in a car crash. Two months later he stopped Georges Bataille in the eighth round at the Granby Halls in Leicester.

Lynch and Kane met again in March 1938, fighting a draw, with Lynch again failing to make the weight and paying a forfeit.

Lynch was arrested later that month and charged with driving offences after crashing his car while drunk and hitting a telegraph pole and a pram containing a 12-week-old baby, and failing to stop after the accident. His trial was delayed until after his world title fight with American Jackie Jurich. He forfeited his world flyweight title against Jurich, when he weighed in at 118.5 lb (53.8 kg), half a pound over the bantamweight limit. Lynch stopped Jurich in the 12th round, but lost the title. At his trial in July, he was fined £20 and disqualified from driving for a year.

=== Decline and death ===
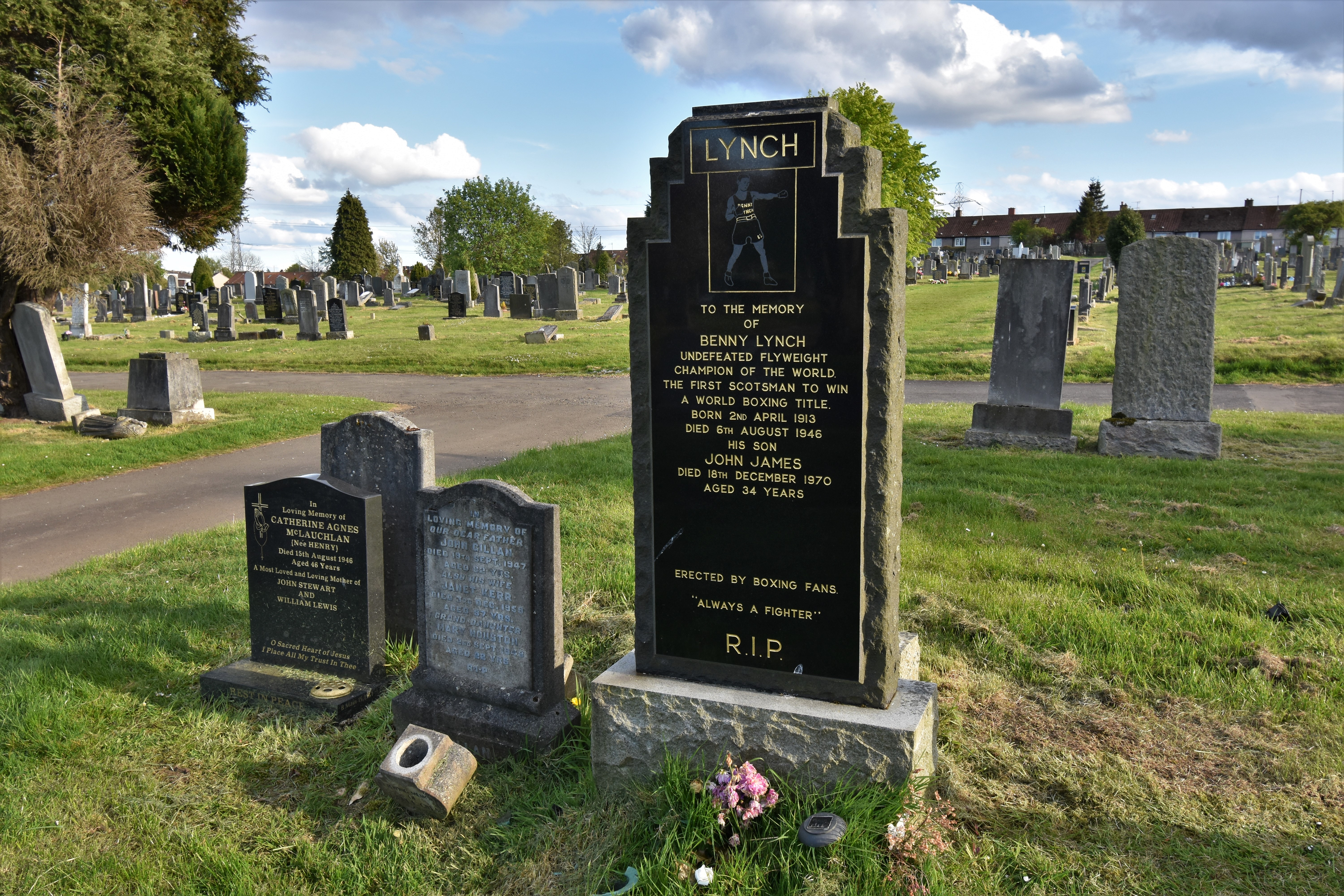
Glasgow. St Kentigern's Cemetery. Benny Lynch's grave

In July 1938 he was fined £200 by the BBBofC and stripped of his British and European titles; Lynch appealed against the decision. In September his boxing licence was suspended for a breach of training regulations. He did, however, face K.O. Morgan at bantamweight later that month at Shawfield Park, losing on points despite being once again over the agreed weight and over 7lbs heavier than his opponent.

In October 1938, after his weight increased again and he suffered a third-round knockout at the hands of Aurel Toma, he was offered 'three months holiday' and received several weeks treatment at a sanatorium in Kent, arranged by the National Sporting Club in an attempt to return him to fitness. In December he left for Ireland to spend a fortnight in a monastery near Waterford.

In January 1939 he went missing during a training camp in Stirlingshire; He was found after being lost on the hills for over six hours, half a mile from his training base, wearing just pyjamas, a dressing gown, and slippers, and suffering from hypothermia.

In February 1939 he was arrested and charged with assault. In March he was found guilty of assaulting his estranged wife, his 11-year-old sister-in-law, and three police officers, with a further charge of assaulting his 18-month old son by attempting to gas him deemed not proven, and was fined £20, with an alternative sentence of 60 days in prison. In June he was the subject of court action by the Inland Revenue.

He was due to fight Dudley Lewis on 27 February 1939 but was prohibited from doing so by the BBBofC.

On 21 August 1939, the Boxing Board refused his application for the restoration of his boxing licence, stating that "he is at present not fit to carry on a career as a professional boxer".

In April 1940 he was fined 30 shillings after being found drunk in Glasgow Road, Ralston. In October 1942 he was charged with offences against a 7-year-old girl in a Glasgow cinema, and was subsequently found guilty of assaulting two girls aged 7 and 10.

He would continue to battle with alcoholism for the rest of his life despite several attempts to treat the disease. Lynch died in 1946 of malnutrition-induced respiratory failure, aged 33. He was buried at St. Kentigern's Cemetery, Glasgow, with some 2,000 people attending the funeral.

=== Legacy ===
Lynch's life was the subject of Bill Bryden's 1974 stage play Benny Lynch, with a book of the play published in 1975, and a television adaptation made in 1976. A second play based on Lynch's life, written by Peter Arnett, was first performed in 1985.

He was featured on the cover of Scottish rock band Gun's second album, Gallus, in 1992. A documentary about the life of Benny Lynch, directed by John Mackenzie and narrated by Robert Carlyle, was made in 2003. Another documentary film about Lynch, Benny, directed by Andrew Gallimore, was first shown in 2017.

The Benny Lynch Story, a stage play written by David Carswell and directed by David Hayman Jr, with Stephen Purdon playing the boxing champion, toured Scotland in May and June 2019.

== Professional boxing record ==
119 fights	88 wins	14 losses
By knockout	34	1
By decision	53	12
By disqualification	1	1
Draws	17	

No.	Result	Record	Opponent	Type	Round	Date	Location	Notes
119	Loss	88–14–17	Aurel Toma	KO	3 (10)	Oct 3, 1938	Empress Hall, Earl's Court, London, England	
118	Loss	88–13–17	K.O. Morgan	PTS	12	Sep 27, 1938	Shawfield Park, Glasgow, Scotland	
117	Win	88–12–17	Jackie Jurich	KO	12 (15)	Jun 29, 1938	St Mirren Football Ground, Paisley, Scotland	NYSAC, NBA, British, and The Ring flyweight titles at stake Only for Jurich (overweight)
116	Draw	87–12–17	Peter Kane	PTS	12	Mar 24, 1938	Anfield Football Ground, Liverpool, England	
115	Win	87–12–16	Maurice Filhol	TKO	5 (12)	Feb 9, 1938	Kelvin Hall, Glasgow, Scotland	
114	Win	86–12–16	Georges Bataille	TKO	8 (10)	Dec 13, 1937	Granby Halls, Leicester, Leicestershire, England	
113	Win	85–12–16	Peter Kane	KO	13 (15)	Oct 13, 1937	Shawfield Park, Glasgow, Scotland	Retained NYSAC, NBA, British, and The Ring flyweight titles
112	Win	84–12–16	Roy Underwood	TKO	6 (12)	Aug 20, 1937	Shawfield Park, Glasgow, Scotland	
111	Loss	83–12–16	Jimmy Warnock	PTS	15	Jun 2, 1937	Celtic Park Stadium, Glasgow, Scotland	
110	Win	83–11–16	Len Hampston	TKO	10 (12)	Mar 22, 1937	Town Hall, Leeds, Yorkshire, England	
109	Loss	82–11–16	Len Hampston	DQ	5 (12)	Mar 1, 1937	King's Hall, Belle Vue, Manchester, England	
108	Win	82–10–16	Fortunato Ortega	PTS	12	Feb 10, 1937	Kelvin Hall, Glasgow, Scotland	
107	Win	81–10–16	Small Montana	PTS	15	Jan 19, 1937	Empire Pool, Wembley, London, England	Retained NBA flyweight title; Won NYSAC and vacant The Ring flyweight titles
106	Win	80–10–16	Eric Jones	KO	2 (8)	Dec 10, 1936	Holborn Stadium Club, Holborn, England	
105	Win	79–10–16	Phil Milligan	TKO	7 (12)	Nov 16, 1936	King's Hall, Belle Vue, Manchester, England	
104	Win	78–10–16	Pat Palmer	KO	8 (15)	Sep 16, 1936	Shawfield Park, Glasgow, Scotland	Retained British and NBA flyweight titles; Won vacant European flyweight title
103	Win	77–10–16	Syd Parker	KO	9 (12)	Jun 16, 1936	Cathkin Park, Glasgow, Scotland	
102	Win	76–10–16	Pat Warburton	TKO	3 (9)	May 28, 1936	Holborn Stadium Club, Holborn, London, England	
101	Win	75–10–16	Mickey McGuire	TKO	4 (10)	Mar 25, 1936	New St James Hall, Newcastle, Tyne and Wear, England	
100	Loss	74–10–16	Jimmy Warnock	PTS	12	Mar 11, 1936	Kings Hall, Belfast, Northern Ireland	
99	Win	74–9–16	Phil Milligan	PTS	12	Dec 19, 1935	Adelphi SC, Glasgow, Scotland	
98	Win	73–9–16	Harry Orton	PTS	10	Dec 12, 1935	Edinburgh National Sporting Club, Leith, Scotland	
97	Win	72–9–16	Gaston Maton	PTS	12	Dec 3, 1935	Caledonian Stadium, Glasgow, Scotland	
96	Win	71–9–16	Jackie Brown	TKO	2 (15)	Sep 9, 1935	King's Hall, Belle Vue, Manchester, England	Won British and vacant NBA flyweight titles
95	Win	70–9–16	Charlie Hazel	KO	1 (10)	May 6, 1935	Cathkin Park, Glasgow, Scotland	
94	Win	69–9–16	Tomas Pardoe	RTD	14 (15)	Apr 14, 1935	Embassy Rink, Sparbrook, West Midlands, England	
93	Draw	68–9–16	Jackie Brown	PTS	12	Mar 4, 1935	Kelvin Hall, Glasgow, Scotland	
92	Win	68–9–15	Bobby Magee	PTS	12	Jan 7, 1935	City Hall, Glasgow, Scotland	
91	Win	67–9–15	Sandy McEwan	PTS	12	Dec 13, 1934	Edinburgh National Sporting Club, Leith, Scotland	
90	Win	66–9–15	Tut Whalley	DQ	8 (10)	Dec 5, 1934	Caird Hall, Dundee, Scotland	
89	Win	65–9–15	Johnny Griffiths	KO	1 (12)	Nov 29, 1934	Edinburgh National Sporting Club, Leith, Scotland	
88	Win	64–9–15	Peter Miller	KO	8 (10)	Nov 12, 1934	New St James Hall, Newcastle, Tyne and Wear, England	
87	Win	63–9–15	Pedro Ruiz	PTS	12	Nov 7, 1934	City Hall, Glasgow, Scotland	
86	Win	62–9–15	Billy Johnstone	TKO	5 (10)	Oct 25, 1934	Adelphi SC, Glasgow, Scotland	
85	Win	61–9–15	Valentin Angelmann	PTS	12	Sep 26, 1934	Cathkin Park, Glasgow, Scotland	
84	Win	60–9–15	Jim Brady	PTS	12	Aug 30, 1934	Parkhead Arena, Glasgow, Scotland	
83	Win	59–9–15	Maurice Huguenin	PTS	12	Aug 8, 1934	Cathkin Park, Glasgow, Scotland	
82	Win	58–9–15	Jim Campbell	PTS	15	Jun 27, 1934	Cathkin Park, Glasgow, Scotland	Retained BBBofC Scottish Area flyweight title
81	Win	57–9–15	Peter Miller	KO	3 (12)	May 31, 1934	Parkhead Arena, Glasgow, Scotland	
80	Win	56–9–15	Evan Evans	TKO	3 (10)	May 29, 1934	City Hall, Glasgow, Scotland	
79	Win	55–9–15	Jim Campbell	PTS	15	May 16, 1934	Olympic Sports Ground, Glasgow, Scotland	Won BBBofC Scottish Area flyweight title
78	Win	54–9–15	George Lowe	RTD	2 (8)	Apr 17, 1934	Adelphi SC, Glasgow, Scotland	
77	Win	53–9–15	Carlo Cavagnoli	PTS	10	Mar 21, 1934	Kelvin Hall, Glasgow, Scotland	
76	Win	52–9–15	Freddy Webb	KO	3 (12)	Feb 8, 1934	Adelphi SC, Glasgow, Scotland	
75	Win	51–9–15	Jim Brady	PTS	12	Jan 30, 1934	Music Hall, Edinburgh, Scotland	
74	Draw	50–9–15	Bob Fielding	PTS	10	Nov 9, 1933	The Stadium, Liverpool, Merseyside, England	
73	Win	50–9–14	Bert Kirby	PTS	12	Oct 29, 1933	Palais de Danse, West Bromwich, West Midlands, England	
72	Win	49–9–14	Boy Ian McIntosh	TKO	4 (10)	Oct 24, 1933	Music Hall, Edinburgh, Scotland	
71	Win	48–9–14	Willie Vogan	KO	2 (10)	Oct 12, 1933	Music Hall, Edinburgh, Scotland	
70	Win	47–9–14	Joe Cowley	TKO	7 (12)	Sep 8, 1933	Parkhead Arena, Bridgeton, Scotland	
69	Win	46–9–14	Alex Farries	TKO	4 (15)	Aug 17, 1933	Parkhead Arena, Glasgow, Scotland	
68	Win	45–9–14	Billy Kid Hughes	TKO	9 (12)	Jun 29, 1933	Parkhead Arena, Glasgow, Scotland	
67	Win	44–9–14	Billy Warnock	TKO	11 (12)	Jun 15, 1933	Parkhead Arena, Glasgow, Scotland	
66	Win	43–9–14	Jim Maharg	PTS	12	May 25, 1933	Parkhead Arena, Glasgow, Scotland	
65	Win	42–9–14	Alex Farries	PTS	8	May 11, 1933	Parkhead Arena, Glasgow, Scotland	
64	Win	41–9–14	Freddie Tennant	PTS	10	May 5, 1933	Premierland, Bridgeton, Scotland	
63	Draw	40–9–14	Jim Brady	PTS	12	May 2, 1933	Premierland, Dundee, Scotland	
62	Win	40–9–13	Walter Lemmon	PTS	10	Apr 21, 1933	Premierland, Bridgeton, Scotland	
61	Draw	39–9–13	Paddy Docherty	PTS	10	Mar 31, 1933	Premierland, Bridgeton, Scotland	
60	Loss	39–9–12	Jimmy Young Knowles	PTS	12	Mar 28, 1933	Premierland, DundeePremierland, Dundee, Scotland	
59	Win	39–8–12	Jim Brady	PTS	12	Mar 25, 1933	The Ring, Glasgow, Scotland	
58	Draw	38–8–12	Jock Joe Aitken	PTS	10	Feb 17, 1933	Premierland, Bridgeton, Scotland	
57	Win	38–8–11	Joe Green	PTS	10	Jan 27, 1933	Janet Street Boxing Pavilion, Leith, Scotland	
56	Win	37–8–11	Freddie Tennant	PTS	10	Jan 25, 1933	Premierland, Dundee, Scotland	
55	Win	36–8–11	Dan Conlin	PTS	10	Jan 13, 1933	Premierland, Bridgeton, Scotland	
54	Draw	35–8–11	Freddie Tennant	PTS	10	Dec 23, 1932	Premierland, Bridgeton, Scotland	
53	Win	35–8–10	Jim Tiger Naughton	PTS	6	Dec 8, 1932	Scottish Stadium, Govan, Scotland	
52	Win	34–8–10	Paddy Docherty	PTS	10	Dec 1, 1932	Scottish Stadium, Govan, Scotland	
51	Draw	33–8–10	Paddy Docherty	PTS	10	Nov 18, 1932	Premierland, Bridgeton, Scotland	
50	Win	33–8–9	George McLeod	KO	5 (10)	Nov 10, 1932	Music Hall, Edinburgh, Scotland	
49	Win	32–8–9	Tommy Higgins	PTS	10	Nov 4, 1932	Premierland, Bridgeton, Scotland	
48	Win	31–8–9	Alex Farries	PTS	10	Oct 29, 1932	Glasgow, Scotland	
47	Draw	30–8–9	Billy Beattie	PTS	6	Oct 21, 1932	Hamilton, Scotland	
46	Win	30–8–8	Freddie Tennant	PTS	10	Oct 17, 1932	National Sporting Club, Edinburgh-Leith, Scotland	
45	Draw	29–8–8	Jock Joe Aitken	PTS	10	Oct 7, 1932	Monkland AC, Town Hall, Airdrie, Scotland	
44	Win	29–8–7	Paddy Docherty	PTS	10	Sep 26, 1932	National Sporting Club, Edinburgh-Leith, Scotland	
43	Win	28–8–7	Paddy Docherty	PTS	10	Sep 3, 1932	The Ring, Glasgow, Scotland	
42	Win	27–8–7	Alex Farries	PTS	10	Sep 1, 1932	Edinburgh, Scotland	
41	Draw	26–8–7	Tony Fleming	PTS	6	Aug 20, 1932	The Ring, Glasgow, Scotland	
40	Win	26–8–6	Peter Curran	PTS	10	Aug 19, 1932	Hamilton, Scotland	
39	Win	25–8–6	Jim Jeffries	PTS	6	Jul 29, 1932	Craighead Park, Blantyre, Scotland	
38	Draw	24–8–6	Tommy Higgins	PTS	10	Jul 15, 1932	Craighead Park, Blantyre, Scotland	
37	Loss	24–8–5	Freddie Tennant	PTS	10	Jul 8, 1932	The Ring, Glasgow, Scotland	
36	Win	24–7–5	Jock Joe Aitken	PTS	12	Jun 9, 1932	The Ring, Glasgow, Scotland	
35	Win	23–7–5	Scotty Deans	KO	4 (?)	May 21, 1932	Glasgow, Scotland	
34	Loss	22–7–5	Young Matt Griffo	PTS	6	Apr 23, 1932	The Ring, Glasgow, Scotland	
33	Win	22–6–5	Jim Tiger Naughton	PTS	6	Apr 21, 1932	Glasgow, Scotland	
32	Win	21–6–5	Young Matt Griffo	PTS	6	Apr 16, 1932	The Ring, Glasgow, Scotland	
31	Win	20–6–5	Jim O'Driscoll	PTS	6	Apr 9, 1932	The Ring, Glasgow, Scotland	
30	Draw	19–6–5	Young McManus	PTS	6	Mar 18, 1932	Glasgow, Scotland	
29	Win	19–6–4	Scotty Deans	PTS	6	Mar 11, 1932	Premierland, Bridgeton, Scotland	
28	Win	18–6–4	Jimmy Barr	PTS	6	Feb 27, 1932	The Ring, Glasgow, Scotland	
27	Win	17–6–4	Kid Murray	PTS	6	Feb 20, 1932	The Ring, Glasgow, Scotland	
26	Loss	16–6–4	Jim Jeffries	PTS	6	Feb 12, 1932	Dumbarton, Scotland	
25	Win	16–5–4	Jack Riley	PTS	6	Feb 11, 1932	Scottish Stadium, Govan, Scotland	
24	Win	15–5–4	Kid Hardy	PTS	6	Feb 5, 1932	The Ring, Glasgow, Scotland	
23	Win	14–5–4	Charlie Deacon	TKO	4 (6)	Jan 1, 1932	Premierland, Bridgeton, Scotland	
22	Draw	13–5–4	Tommy Murdoch	PTS	10	Dec 16, 1931	Glasgow, Scotland	
21	Win	13–5–3	Paddy Sweeney	PTS	6	Nov 28, 1931	Glasgow, Scotland	
20	Win	12–5–3	Peter Sherry	PTS	6	Nov 13, 1931	Premierland, Bridgeton, Scotland	
19	Win	11–5–3	Mick Cassidy	PTS	6	Nov 6, 1931	Premierland, Bridgeton, Scotland	
18	Loss	10–5–3	Mick Young McAdam	PTS	8	Oct 29, 1931	Scottish Stadium, Govan, Scotland	
17	Win	10–4–3	Young O'Brien	PTS	4	Oct 15, 1931	Scottish Stadium, Govan, Scotland	
16	Win	9–4–3	Tommy Murdoch	PTS	8	Oct 12, 1931	Glasgow, Scotland	
15	Loss	8–4–3	Paddy Docherty	PTS	8	Oct 1, 1931	Premierland, Bridgeton, Scotland	
14	Draw	8–3–3	Joe Boag	PTS	6	Sep 26, 1931	Glasgow, Scotland	
13	Loss	8–3–2	Paddy Docherty	PTS	10	Sep 25, 1931	Glasgow, Scotland	
12	Draw	8–2–2	Tommy Murdoch	PTS	8	Sep 18, 1931	Premierland, Glasgow, Scotland	
11	Win	8–2–1	Jim McKenzie	PTS	6	Sep 12, 1931	Glasgow, Scotland	
10	Loss	7–2–1	Young O'Brien	PTS	6	Sep 4, 1931	The Ring, Glasgow, Scotland	
9	Win	7–1–1	Jim Devanney	TKO	3 (6)	Aug 22, 1931	The Ring, Glasgow, Scotland	
8	Draw	6–1–1	Young Donnelly	PTS	8	Aug 14, 1931	Watson's Arena, Glasgow, Scotland	
7	Win	6–1	Willie Leggatt	PTS	6	Jul 31, 1931	Glasgow, Scotland	
6	Win	5–1	Joe Rivers	PTS	6	Jun 26, 1931	Glasgow, Scotland	
5	Win	4–1	Young McColl	KO	3 (10)	Jun 11, 1931	Watson's Arena, Glasgow, Scotland	
4	Win	3–1	Peter Sherry	PTS	6	May 30, 1931	Barrowfield Park, Glasgow, Scotland	
3	Loss	2–1	Packy Boyle	PTS	6	May 23, 1931	The Ring, Glasgow, Scotland	
2	Win	2–0	Tommy Murdoch	PTS	6	Apr 29, 1931	Glasgow, Scotland	
1	Win	1–0	Young Bryce	TKO	2 (6)	Apr 24, 1931	Glasgow, Scotland	

== Titles in boxing ==
=== Major world titles ===
- NYSAC flyweight champion (112 lbs)
- NBA (WBA) flyweight champion (112 lbs)

=== The Ring magazine titles ===
- The Ring flyweight champion (112 lbs)

=== Regional/International titles ===
- Scottish Area flyweight champion (112 lbs)
- British flyweight champion (112 lbs)
- European flyweight champion (112 lbs)

=== Undisputed titles ===
- Undisputed flyweight champion

== See also ==
- List of flyweight boxing champions
- List of British flyweight boxing champions

Achievements
Preceded by Small Montana	NBA flyweight champion 19 January 1937 – 29 June 1938; Stripped	Vacant Title next held by Peter Kane
Preceded by Small Montana	NYSAC flyweight champion 19 January 1937 – 29 June 1938; Stripped	Vacant Title next held by Jackie Paterson
Preceded by Jackie Brown	British flyweight champion 9 September 1935 – 13 October 1937 (1938); Retired	Vacant Title next held by Jackie Paterson
Vacant Title last held by Fidel LaBarba	The Ring flyweight champion 19 January 1937 – 29 June 1938; Vacated	Vacant Title next held by Peter Kane
Status
Preceded by Victor Perez	Latest born world champion to die August 6, 1946 – October 29, 1949	Succeeded by Marcel Cerdan
