= Clara Copley =

British entrepreneur

Clara Copley (14 May 1865 – 14 March 1949) was an Irish boxing promoter, who was born into a family of circus performers. Also known as Ma Copley, she was the proprietor of organized boxing matches at Belfast Chapel Fields Arena in Belfast, Northern Ireland during the 1930s. A number of men fought in her earlier boxing booth and her later arena matches for the prize moneys offered. One of the boxers was Rinty Monaghan who became World Boxing Association World Champion in the Flyweight division by knocking out reigning champion Jackie Paterson on 23 March 1948 at King's Hall, Belfast. Other Irish boxers who took to prize-money matches in Copley's ring include Bantamweight Ed Bunty Doran, who was often pitted against Monaghan in the professional ring and later became an Irish champion; Welterweight Tommy Armour who later knocked out British Welterweight Champion Eric Boon; and Flyweight Jimmy Warnock, one of the first from Copley's rings to make money professionally.

Copley died at Donegall Pass, Belfast on 14 March 1949. A plaque was unveiled on her former home by the Ulster Historical Circle.
