= James Warnock (murderer) =

English convicted murderer

James Warnock (born December 1959) and known as 'Jimmy Warnock', grew up in north London in the Caledonian Road area of Islington. After primary school he attended Sir William Collins Secondary School in Somers Town, which later changed its name to South Camden Community School and is now renamed Regent High School. In July 2016, aged 57, he was given a life sentence, with a minimum of 25 years for the rape and murder of 17-year-old Yiannoulla Yianni (known to friends and family as Lucy) in 1982 at her home alone, when her parents, brothers and sisters were working in their shop in the area known as Swiss Cottage, London.

== DNA match ==
He was eventually arrested in 2015 after a police investigation into his use and sale of indecent images of children online.

During 1982 it was routine for the police to retain samples of material such as those including semen although the technology was not sufficiently advanced to identify individuals. As a result of his arrest, the police checked his DNA against the sample that had been obtained at Yiannoulla's home in 1982 - as, although samples had only been kept in the case of murder, the sample taken in 1982 matched his DNA exactly.

At the time of Yiannoulla's death, Warnock was living on the 17th floor of the Taplow building in Adelaide Road in Camden, North London, with his wife Lynne. Shortly afterwards he moved to Lawn Road in Belsize Park with his pregnant wife. The couple separated in 1993 and divorced in 2002. At the time of his arrest he had moved to Harrington House on the Regents Park Estate in Camden.

The case was one of the Metropolitan Police's unsolved murders before DNA samples from the scene matched to the former tiler in December 2015. It was not until 1999 that DNA could be extracted from the bedspread in this case. The court heard the Metropolitan Police got a "lucky break" in December 2015 when Warnock was arrested over indecent images of children and had to give a DNA sample. The sample was found to be an exact match to semen found at the murder scene.

Reporting restrictions were lifted when Warnock admitted six indecent images offences relating to photos of young children and a baby in 2013 and 2015.

Warnock had earlier described himself to the court as having been very slim with dark hair, styled like the actor John Travolta, at the time of the murder on 13 August 1982.

In a victim impact statement, Yiannoulla's family said: "For over half a lifetime we have had to live with the daily torture of what happened to our daughter and sister Lucy. All who knew her, loved and adored her. We now pray that we can move forward with the rest of our lives having some peace in knowing that her killer has been brought to justice and that a very dangerous man is no longer a threat to anyone else."

Prosecutor Crispin Aylett QC told the trial that Yiannoulla had been with her parents Elli and George Yianni at their shoe repair shop a short distance from their home on the day of the attack, but went home early to prepare supper.

A man in his early 20s was spotted chatting with her on the doorstep, before a neighbour heard a scream about 20 minutes later, the jury heard.

Her parents returned home to find jewellery scattered on the stairs and called out to her, before finding her partially naked body on her parents bed. During the trial he claimed he had been in a sexual relationship with the schoolgirl after meeting her at the family's shop, but the court heard she was a virgin before the attack. Warnock was accused of murdering the 17-year-old girl in 1982 and told a court he used to meet her for sex and that he had been in a sexual relationship with Yiannoulla Yianni. The court was told medical evidence suggested the Greek Cypriot had been a virgin when she was raped and strangled at her home in Hampstead, north London.

== See also ==
Active UK cold cases where the offender's DNA is known:

- Murder of Deborah Linsley
- Murders of Eve Stratford and Lynne Weedon
- Murders of Jacqueline Ansell-Lamb and Barbara Mayo
- Murder of Lindsay Rimer
- Murder of Janet Brown
- Murder of Linda Cook
- Murder of Melanie Hall
- Batman rapist, subject to Britain's longest-running serial rape investigation
