= Praxille Gydé =

French boxer (born 1908)

Personal information
- Nationality: French
- Born: 5 September 1908 Roubaix, France
- Weight: Flyweight

Boxing career

Boxing record
- Total fights: 14467
- Wins: 118
- Win by KO: 34
- Losses: 30
- Draws: 19

Praxille Gydé (born 5 September 1908) was a French boxer who was European flyweight champion between November 1932 and June 1935.

== Career ==
After making his professional debut in March 1924, Gydé won the vacant European flyweight title in November 1932, by stopping Willi Metzner in the eighth round. He went on to retain the title by defending against Maurice Huguenin and Kid Oliva (which ended in a draw), in February 1933, Emile Degand in May 1933, Oliva again in November 1933, Mariano Arilla in January 1934, Rene Gabes in March 1934, Pedro Ruiz in June 1934, Francois Atenza in October 1934, and Huguenin again in January 1935. Gydé also won the French title with his second European defence against Huguenin in January 1935 and ended up drawing with Maurice Dupuis in his only domestic title defence. He lost the European title in June, 1935 in his tenth defence, losing a points decision to Kid David. Disgusted by the scoring, he announced his retirement three months later, but had a change of heart and continued fighting until mid-1936, his final fight a loss via third round knockout at the hands of Peter Kane.

Gydé's older brother, Auguste, was also a professional boxer, fighting at featherweight.
