= John Warnock =

American computer scientist, inventor and technology businessman (1940–2023)

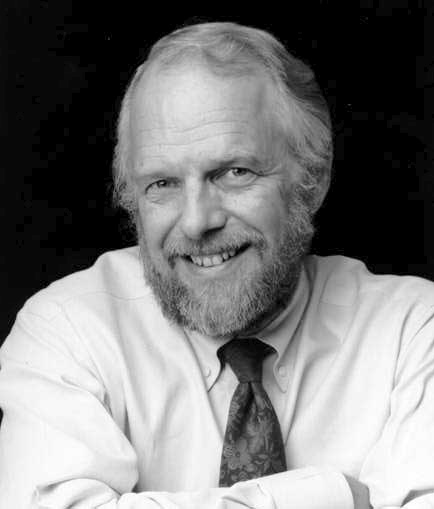
- Warnock in 2008
- Born: John Edward Warnock; October 6, 1940; Salt Lake City, Utah, U.S.
- Died: August 19, 2023 (aged 82); Los Altos, California, U.S.
- Education: University of Utah (BS, MS, PhD)
- Known for: Adobe Systems; PostScript; Portable Document Format (PDF)
- Spouse: Marva M. Warnock (m. 1965)
- Awards: Software Systems Award (1989, Association for Computing Machinery); Edwin H. Land Medal (2000, Optical Society of America); Bodley Medal (2003, Bodleian Library at Oxford University); Lovelace Medal (2004, British Computer Society); Medal of Achievement (2006, AeA); Computer Entrepreneur Award (2008, IEEE Computer Society); United States National Medal of Technology and Innovation (2009); Marconi Prize (2010)
- Scientific career
- Fields: Computer science
- Workplaces: University of Utah
- Doctoral advisor: David C. Evans; Ivan Sutherland

John Edward Warnock (October 6, 1940 – August 19, 2023) was an American computer scientist, inventor, technology businessman, and philanthropist best known for co-founding Adobe Systems Inc., the graphics and publishing software company, with Charles Geschke in 1982. Warnock was President of Adobe for his first two years and chairman and CEO for his remaining sixteen years at the company. Although he retired as CEO in 2001, he continued to co-chair the Adobe Board of Directors with Geschke until 2017. Warnock pioneered the development of graphics, publishing, web and electronic document technologies that have revolutionized the field of publishing and visual communications.

== Early life and education ==
Warnock was born on October 6, 1940, and raised in the Salt Lake City, Utah suburb of Holladay. He failed mathematics in ninth grade before graduating from Olympus High School in 1958; however, Warnock went on to earn a Bachelor of Science degree in mathematics and philosophy, a Doctor of Philosophy degree in electrical engineering (computer science), and an honorary degree in science, all from the University of Utah. At the University of Utah he was a member of the Gamma Beta chapter of the Beta Theta Pi fraternity. He also received an honorary degree from the American Film Institute. He lived in the San Francisco Bay Area with his wife Marva M. Warnock, marrying in 1965. Marva is a former partner and graphic designer at Marsh Design in Palo Alto, California, and is known not only for creating the iconic Adobe logo, but also as a designer for nonprofit organizations. They have three children.

== Career ==
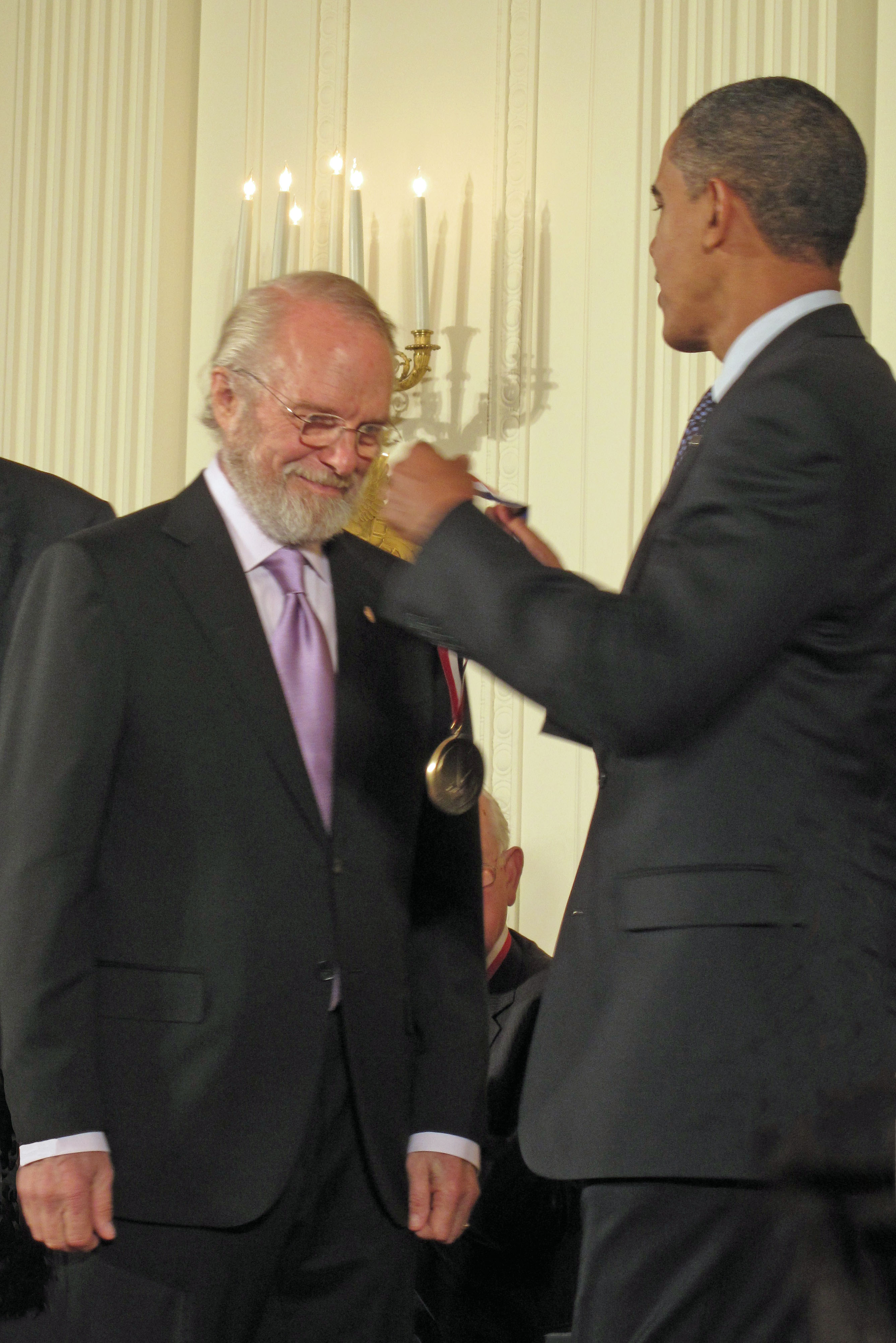
Dr. Warnock receives National Medal of Technology and Innovation from President Barack Obama in 2009.

Warnock is known as the creative driving force behind Adobe System's initial software products: PostScript, Adobe Illustrator, and the PDF, and he continued to be involved in new product development throughout his career. "The thing I really enjoy is the invention process. I enjoy figuring out how to do things other people don't know how to do."

Warnock's earliest publication and subject of his master's thesis was his 1964 proof of a theorem solving the Jacobson radical for row-finite matrices, which was originally posed by the American mathematician Nathan Jacobson in 1956.

In his 1969 doctoral thesis, Warnock invented the Warnock algorithm for hidden-surface determination in computer graphics. It works by recursive subdivision of a scene until areas are obtained that are trivial to compute. It solves the problem of rendering a complicated image by avoiding the problem. If the scene is simple enough to compute then it is rendered; otherwise it is divided into smaller parts and the process is repeated. Warnock noted that for this work he received "the dubious distinction of having written the shortest doctoral thesis in University of Utah history". The Warnock algorithm solving the hidden-surface problem enabled computers to render solid objects at a time when most computer renderings were only line drawings and was featured on the cover of Scientific American in 1970 with accompanying article by Ivan Sutherland.

In 1976, while Warnock worked at Evans & Sutherland, a Salt Lake City–based computer graphics company, the concepts of the PostScript language were seeded. Prior to co-founding Adobe with Geschke, Warnock worked with Geschke at Xerox's Palo Alto Research Center (Xerox PARC), where he had started in 1978. Unable to convince Xerox management of the approach to commercialize the InterPress graphics language for controlling printing on any computer and printer, he and Geschke left Xerox to start Adobe in 1982, naming it after Adobe Creek, which ran behind both their homes. They initially hired two computer scientists (Bill Paxton and Doug Brotz) and two electronics designers (Tom Boynton and Dan Putnam) from PARC. At their new company, they developed from scratch a similar technology, PostScript, and brought it to market for Apple's LaserWriter in 1985. Apple co-founder Steve Jobs said: "When that first page came out of the LaserWriter, I was blown away...No one had seen anything like this before. I held this page up in my hand and said, ‘Who will not want that?’ I knew then, as did John, that this was going to have a profound impact." Adobe's PostScript technology made it possible to print high-resolution text and images from a computer, revolutionizing media and making desktop publishing feasible.

In late 1986, Warnock invented Adobe Illustrator, a computer drawing program that used lines and Bézier curves to render infinitely scalable graphics. He initially developed it to automate many of the manual tasks utilized by his wife, Marva, a graphic designer. Illustrator was released in early 1987.

In the spring of 1991, Warnock outlined a system called "Camelot", inventing the Portable Document Format (PDF) file-format. The goal of Camelot was to "effectively capture documents from any application, send electronic versions of these documents anywhere, and view and print these documents on any machines [sic]". Warnock's document contemplated:

Imagine if the IPS (Interchange PostScript) viewer is also equipped with text searching capabilities. In this case the user could find all documents that contain a certain word or phrase, and then view that word or phrase in context within the document. Entire libraries could be archived in electronic form...

The new PDF format, though, was slow to gain industry traction and Warnock noted that "the industry 'did not get it'".

One of Adobe's popular typefaces, Warnock, is named after him.

Warnock held twenty patents. In addition to Adobe Systems, he was or had been on the board of directors at ebrary, Hiball, Knight-Ridder, Octavo Corporation, Netscape Communications, and Salon Media Group. Warnock was a past chairman of the Tech Museum of Innovation in San Jose. He was on the board of trustees of the American Film Institute, the Sundance Institute and the Folger Shakespeare Library.

His hobbies included photography, skiing, web development, painting, hiking, curation of rare scientific books, and historical Native American objects.

Warnock's early career and interests are described in the book Programmers at Work, a collection of interviews published by Microsoft Press.

== Philanthropy ==
A strong supporter of higher education, Warnock and his wife, Marva, have supported three presidential-endowed chairs in computer science, mathematics, and fine arts at the University of Utah, and also an endowed chair in medical research at Stanford University. In 2003, Warnock and his wife donated 200,000 shares of Adobe Systems, Inc. to the University of Utah as a cornerstone gift enabling completion of a new engineering building, now the John E. and Marva M. Warnock Engineering Building (WEB). The WEB was completed in 2007 and houses the Scientific Computing and Imaging Institute and the Dean of the University of Utah College of Engineering. John and Marva have also personally assisted with cataract surgeries led by Geoffrey Tabin on missions to reverse blindness in least developed countries. They endowed a chair at the Moran Eye Center, which supports work to treat preventable blindness in Utah and around the world. John was also the Founding Chairman of the Tech Museum of Innovation from 1995 to 1999.

Warnock, the commencement speaker for the University of Utah Class of 2020, advised: "The rest of your life is not a spectator sport. Your job in life is to be an active player, to make the world a better place."

== Death ==
Warnock died in Los Altos, California, on August 19, 2023, at the age of 82, from pancreatic cancer.

== Recognition ==
The recipient of numerous scientific and technical awards, Warnock won the Software Systems Award from the Association for Computing Machinery in 1989. In 1995 Warnock received the University of Utah Distinguished Alumnus Award and in 1999 he was inducted as a fellow of the Association for Computing Machinery. Warnock was awarded the Edwin H. Land Medal from the Optical Society of America in 2000. In 2002, he was made a fellow of the Computer History Museum for "his accomplishments in the commercialization of desktop publishing with Chuck Geschke and for innovations in scalable type, computer graphics and printing." Oxford University's Bodleian Library bestowed the Bodley Medal on Warnock in November 2003. In 2004, Warnock received the Lovelace Medal from the British Computer Society in London. In October 2006, Warnock—along with Adobe co-founder Charles Geschke—received the American Electronics Association's Annual Medal of Achievement Award, being the first software executives to receive this award. In 2008, Warnock and Geschke received the Computer Entrepreneur Award from the IEEE Computer Society "for inventing PostScript and PDF and helping to launch the desktop publishing revolution and change the way people engage with information and entertainment". In September 2009, Warnock and Geschke were chosen to receive the National Medal of Technology and Innovation, one of the nation's highest honors bestowed on scientists, engineers and inventors. In 2010, Warnock and Geschke received the Marconi Prize, an honor specifically for contributions to information science and communications.

Warnock was a member of the National Academy of Engineering, the American Academy of Arts and Sciences, and the American Philosophical Society. He received honorary degrees from the University of Utah, the American Film Institute, and The University of Nottingham in the UK.

== See also ==
- Rare Book Room, digitized first editions of great scientific books, formerly Octavo Corporation
- Warnock algorithm
