= Octavo (disambiguation) =

Octavo is a technical term describing the format of a book.

Octavo may also refer to:

- pseudonym of Henri Julien (1852–1908), French Canadian artist
- Octavo (Discworld), a grimoire in the Discworld series by Terry Pratchett
- Octavo Corp., a company in Oakland, California, that publishes digital editions of rare books — see Rare Book Room

== See also ==
- Octave
- Octavio
