= Octavio =

Octavio is a Spanish language masculine given name. In the Portuguese language the given name Octavio or Octávio is also found, but in Portuguese the normal spelling is Otávio. It is also used as a surname in the Philippines.

== Individuals ==
- Octavio Dotel (1973–2025), Dominican Major League Baseball relief pitcher
- Octavio Paz Lozano (1914–1998), Mexican writer, poet, and diplomat, and the winner of the 1990 Nobel Prize for Literature
- Octavio Ocampo (born 1943), Mexican artist
- Octavio Vazquez (born 1972), Spanish-American composer
- Octavio Zambrano (born 1958), Ecuadorian soccer coach
- Marco Octávio, Brazilian beach soccer coach
- Octavio Gallotti (1930–2026), Brazilian judge
- Octávio Mateus (born 1975), Portuguese paleontologist
- Octávio Tarquínio de Sousa (1889–1959), Brazilian historian and author
- Octávio Trompowsky (1897–1984), Brazilian chess player
- Omar Octavio Carrasco (1974–1994), Argentine murder victim

== Fictional Characters ==
- A character in Scarface (1983 film)
- A character in Eating Out 2: Sloppy Seconds
- List of characters in King of the Hill § Other recurring characters, a character in King of the Hill
- List of Sly Cooper characters § Octavio, a character from the video game Sly 3: Honor Among Thieves
- The final boss of Splatoon
- Octavio Silva, also known as Octane, a playable character in Apex Legends
- Octavio the Octopus, an octopus who appeared in The Owl and the Octopus episode of Jim Henson's Animal Show

== Film and TV ==
- Octavio, a 1990 documentary by Camille de Casabianca
- Octavio, a 2011 film by José Antonio Torres

== Other ==
- SD Octavio Vigo, a Spanish handball club based in Vigo, Galicia, Spain.
- The name given by Jimi Hendrix to an effects pedal used with electric guitars, invented by Jim Morris of Kelsey-Morris Sound, London. A later version was called an Octavia (effects pedal)

== See also ==
- Octavo (disambiguation)
- Ottavio (disambiguation), the Italian equivalent of Octavio
