= Maurice Huguenin =

French boxer

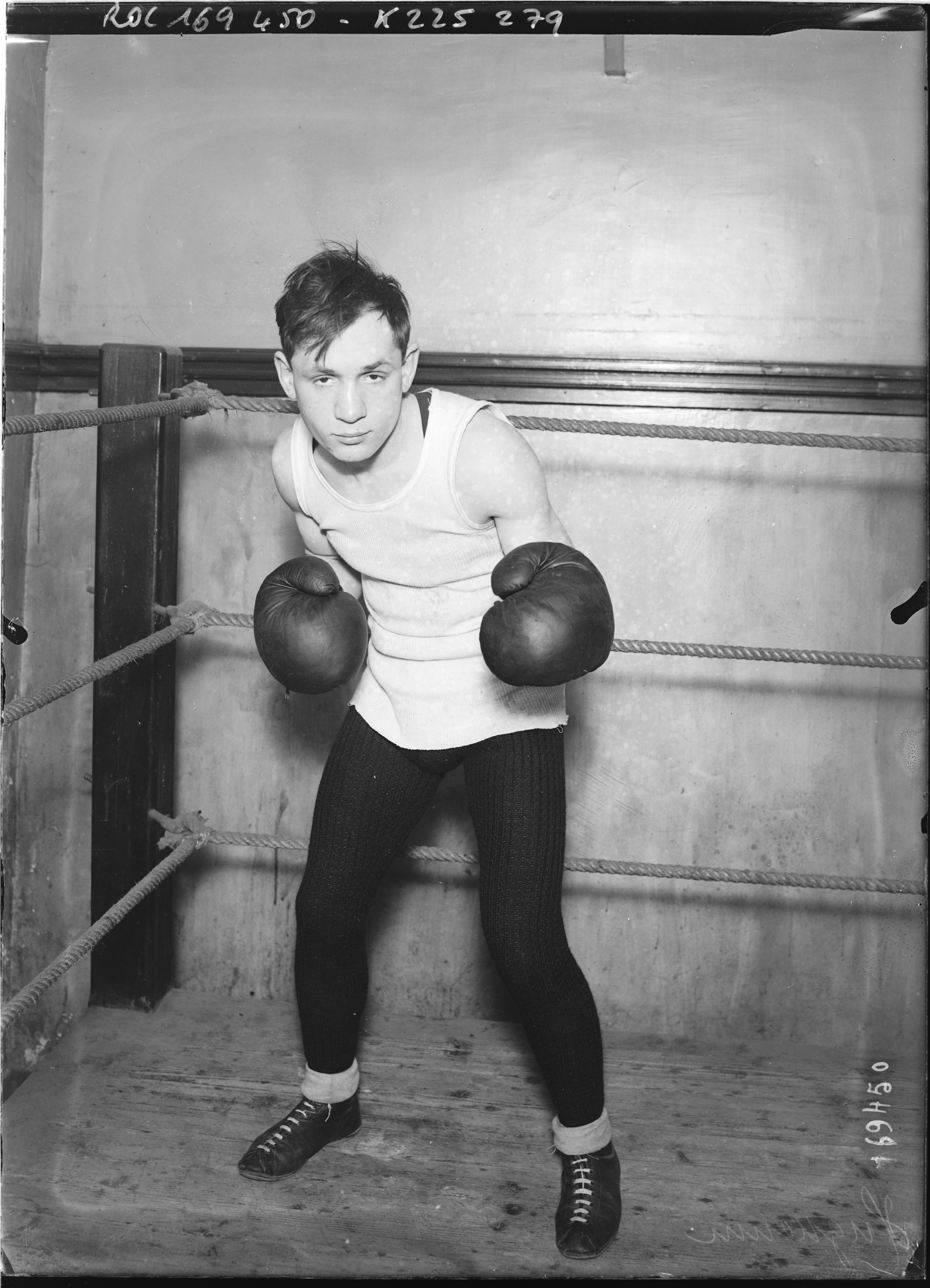

Personal information
- Nationality: French
- Born: 3 November 1909 Paris, France
- Weight: Flyweight, bantamweight

Boxing career

Boxing record
- Total fights: 110
- Wins: 72
- Win by KO: 33
- Losses: 28
- Draws: 10

Maurice Huguenin (born 3 November 1909) was a French boxer who won the French flyweight title, and challenged for the European flyweight title on two occasions and the European bantamweight title once.

== Career ==
Born in Paris, Huguenin made his professional debut in March 1926, losing to Victor Crauc. After mixed results in his first three years as a pro, in 1929 he started a winning run that lasted until 1932, including wins over Joe Mendiola, Italian champion Orlando Magliozzi, Victor Ferrand, and future European champion Praxille Gydé.

In the latter half of 1932 he lost twice (to Valentin Angelmann and Kid Oliva), with two drawn fights against Mariano Arilla.

In February 1933 he got his first shot at the European title against defending champion Gydé. The fight went the distance, with Gydé taking a split decision.

During the rest of 1933 and 1934 Huguenin won 26 fights (including victories over Rene Chalange, Valentin Angelmann, Eugene Huat, and three over Pedro Ruiz), with one draw (with Angelmann) and two losses (to Kid Francis and Benny Lynch).

In January 1934, Huguenin was ranked 8 in the world at flyweight in a list compiled by 100 American boxing critics. A year later he was ranked fourth by The Ring magazine.

He started 1935 with a win over Gino Cattaneo before facing Gydé in late January for the European and French titles. Gydé took a points decision to retain the titles.

In late 1935 he suffered three straight defeats, to Cuban champion Rafael Valdez, Jimmy Warnock (in a fight that set an attendance record of 15,000 for an indoor fight in Ireland), and Ernst Weiss.

His third attempt to win a European title came in February 1937, when he lost on points to Nicolas Petit-Biquet in Brussels for the bantamweight title. He won his next two fights, drawing the next, before losing by a first-round knockout to Peter Kane in June 1937. Only a week later he beat Young Gonzalez in what would prove to be his final winning bout. He lost his last nine fights, including a third-round knockout at the hands of Panama Al Brown, before retiring in late 1938.
