= Babadag =

- Town
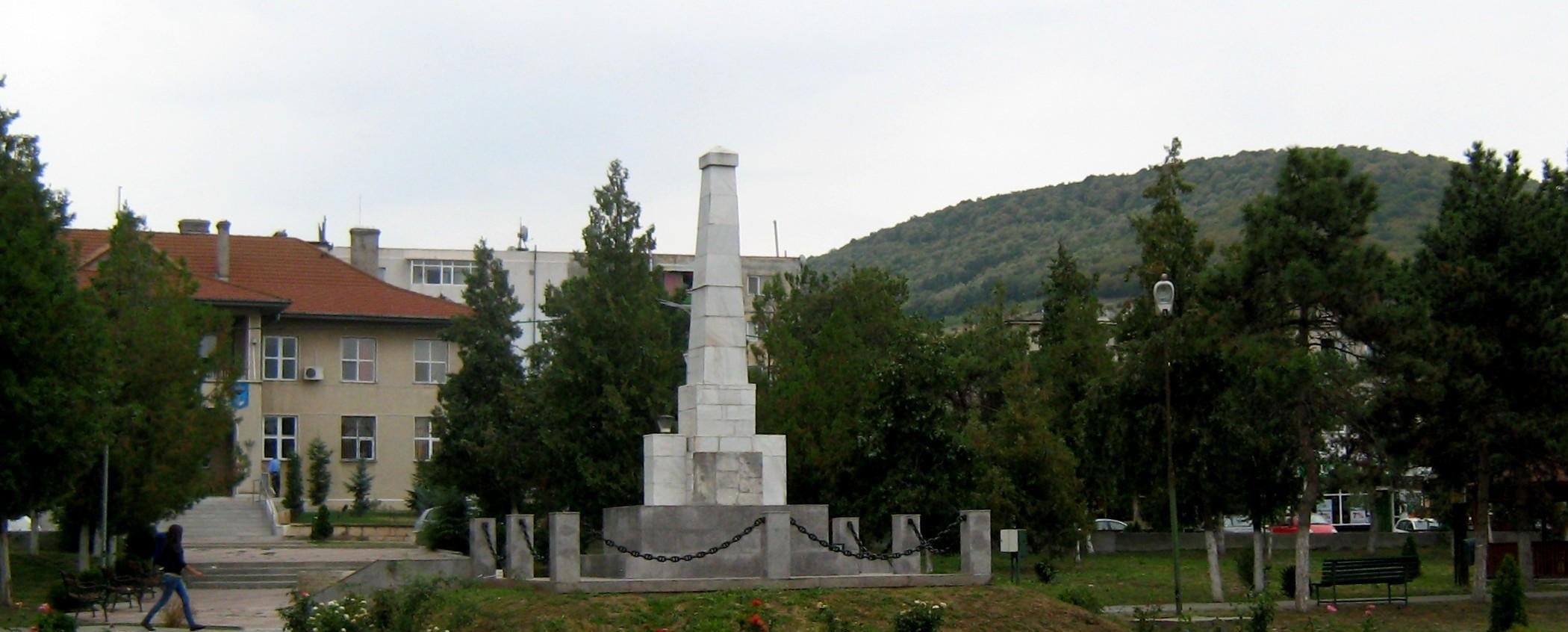
- Babadag park

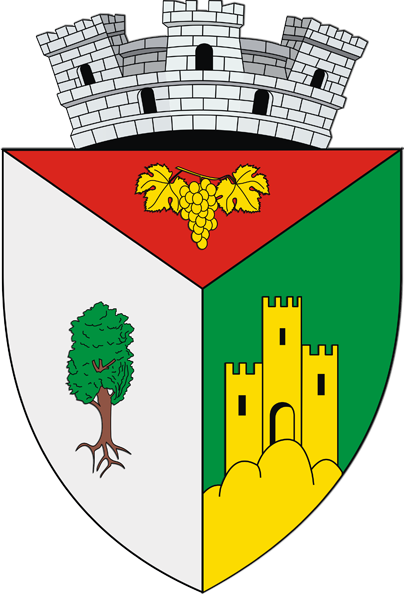
- Coat of arms

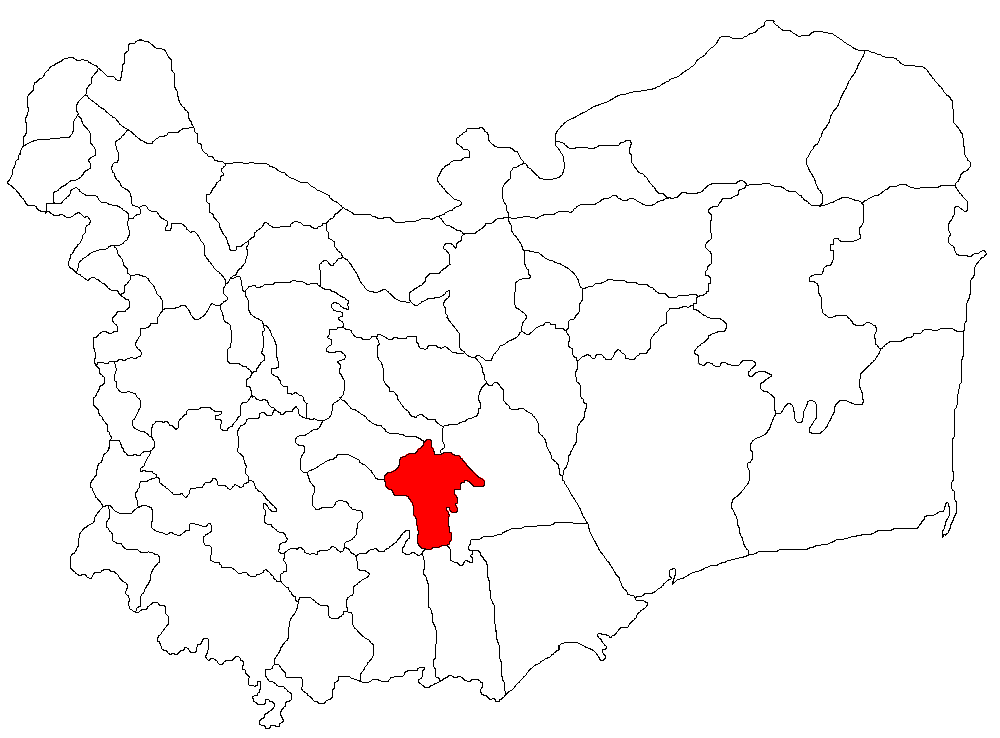
- Location in Tulcea County

- Location in Romania
- Coordinates: 44°53′53″N 28°44′31″E
- Country: Romania
- County: Tulcea

Government
  - Mayor (2024–2028): Georgian Caraman (PNL)
- Area: 121 km^{2} (47 sq mi)
- Elevation: 40 m (130 ft)
- Highest elevation: 120 m (390 ft)
- Lowest elevation: 15 m (49 ft)
- Population (2021-12-01): 9,213
  - Density: 76.1/km^{2} (197/sq mi)
- Time zone: UTC+02:00 (EET)
  - Summer (DST): UTC+03:00 (EEST)
- Postal code: 825100
- Area code: +40 x40
- Vehicle reg.: TL
- Website: primariababadag.ro

Babadag (Romanian pronunciation: [babaˈdaɡ]; Turkish: Babadağ, lit. "Father Mountain"), formerly known as Babatag, is a town in Tulcea County, Romania, located on a small lake formed by the river Taița, in the densely wooded highlands of Northern Dobruja. One of the several tombs of Sari Saltik is found in town.

The Babadag Lake is divided only by a strip of marshland from Razim Lake, a broad landlocked sheet of water spilling into the Black Sea.

== History ==
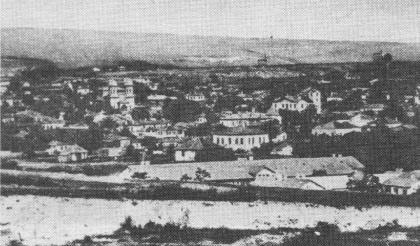
Babadag at the end of the 19th century

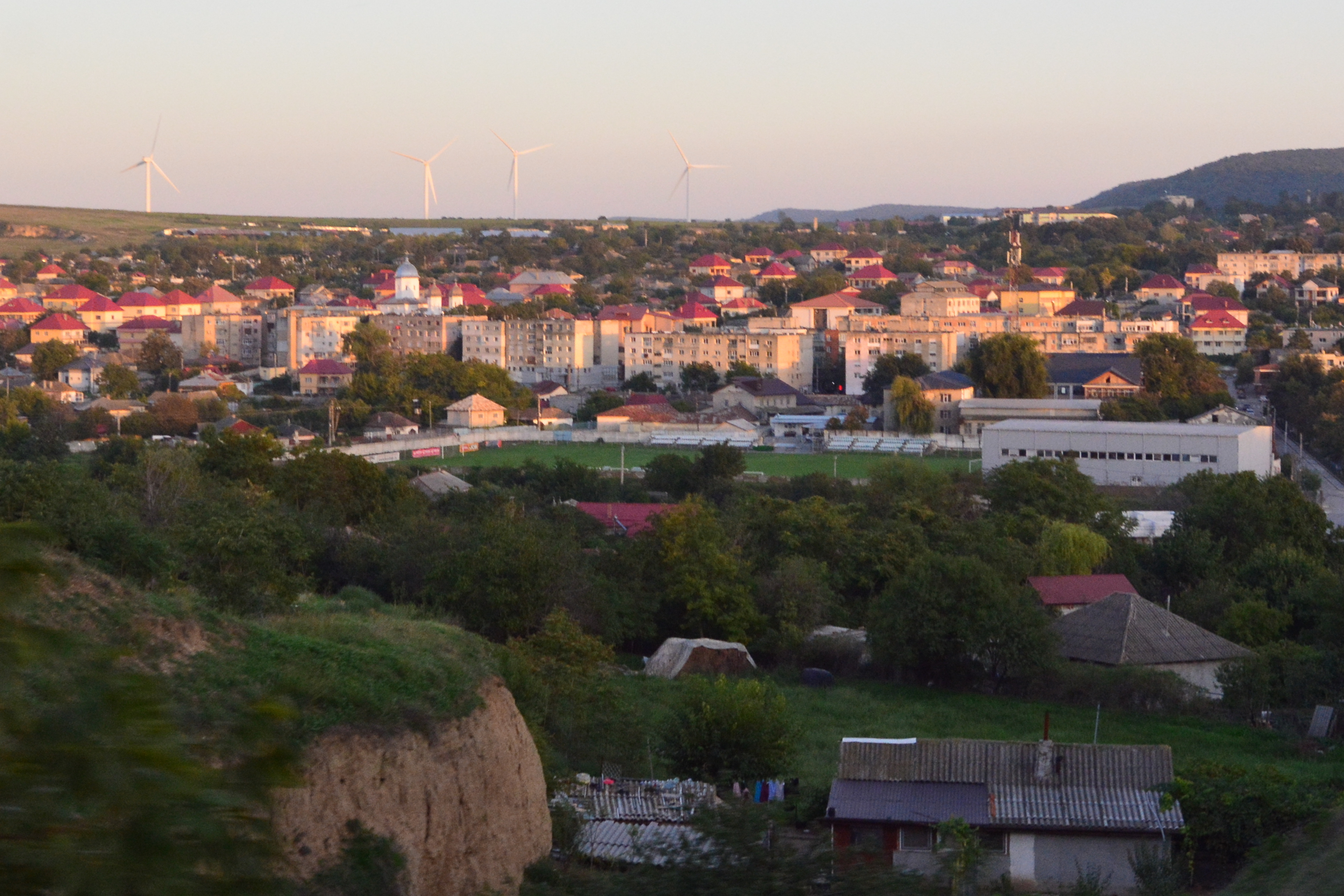
Babadag in 2024

The name of Babadag is connected with 13th century dervish Baba Sari Saltik, who is said to have led a number of Turkomans to Dobruja and to have settled them in this area. The town was first mentioned by Ibn Battuta under the name Baba Saltuk, as the furthermost outpost of the "Turks" (i.e., the Golden Horde).

The town was conquered by Bayezid I, sultan of the Ottoman Empire, in his 1393 Danubian campaign. The construction of a fortress was begun here in 1633 during the reign of Murad IV, but by 1650 only the fortress's foundation walls and towers were standing. In the 17th century, it occasionally served as the winter headquarters for the Grand Vizier of the Ottoman Empire during their wars with Russia. The town's location near to the Black Sea made it a target for the Russian navy, the town was bombed by the Russians in 1854 during the Crimean War. In the mid-19th century, Babadag formed part of the region (sanjak) of Silistra within the "Bulgarian Government" (Danube Vilayet). Following the 1877–1878 war between the Ottoman and Russian empires, Babadag became part of independent Romania.

== Demographics ==
Historical population
Year	Pop.	±%
1900	3,500	—
1912	4,686	+33.9%
1930	4,626	−1.3%
1948	4,022	−13.1%
1956	5,549	+38.0%
1966	7,343	+32.3%
1977	8,564	+16.6%
1992	10,437	+21.9%
2002	10,878	+4.2%
2011	8,940	−17.8%
2021	9,213	+3.1%
Source: Census data

In 1900, Babadag's population was 3,500. The 2011 census counted 8,940 inhabitants; the population distribution was: 6,267 Romanians (77.64%), 1,248 Horahane Roma (15.46%), 420 Turks (5.2%), 37 Lipovans (0.45%), and 98 others. 84.8% were Romanian Orthodox and 14.2% Muslim. At the 2021 census, Babadag had a population of 9,213; of those, 66.36% were Romanians, 16.23% Roma, and 2.42% Turks.

== Economy ==
Before the First World War, Babadag served as the market for wool and mutton from the Dobruja.

== Natives ==
- Aurel Toma (1911–1980), professional boxer
- Kemal Karpat (1924–2019), historian and professor at the University of Wisconsin–Madison
- Nelu Stănescu (1957-2004), footballer
- Laurențiu Iorga (born 1988), footballer

== Gallery ==
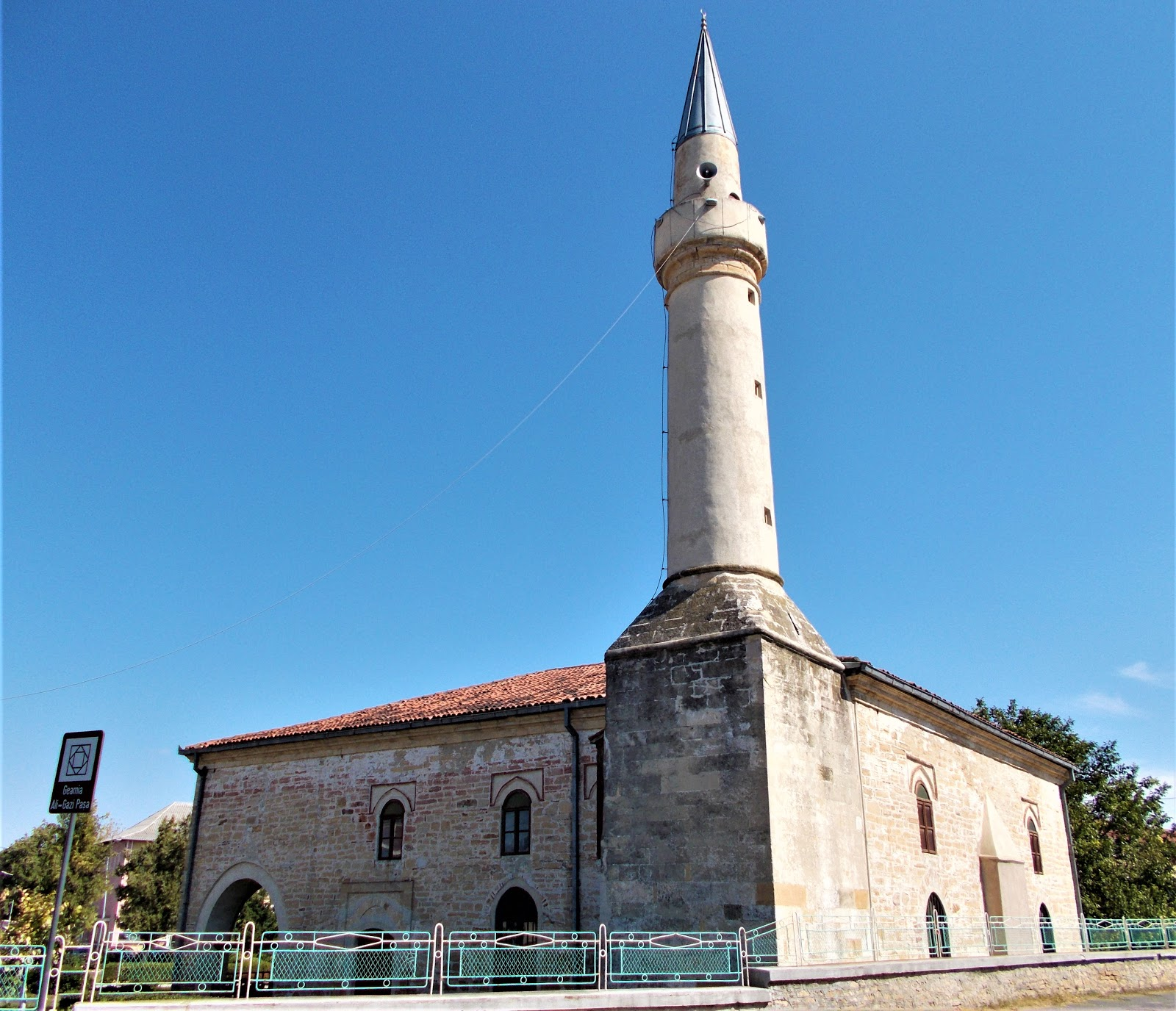
The Gazi Ali Pasha Mosque

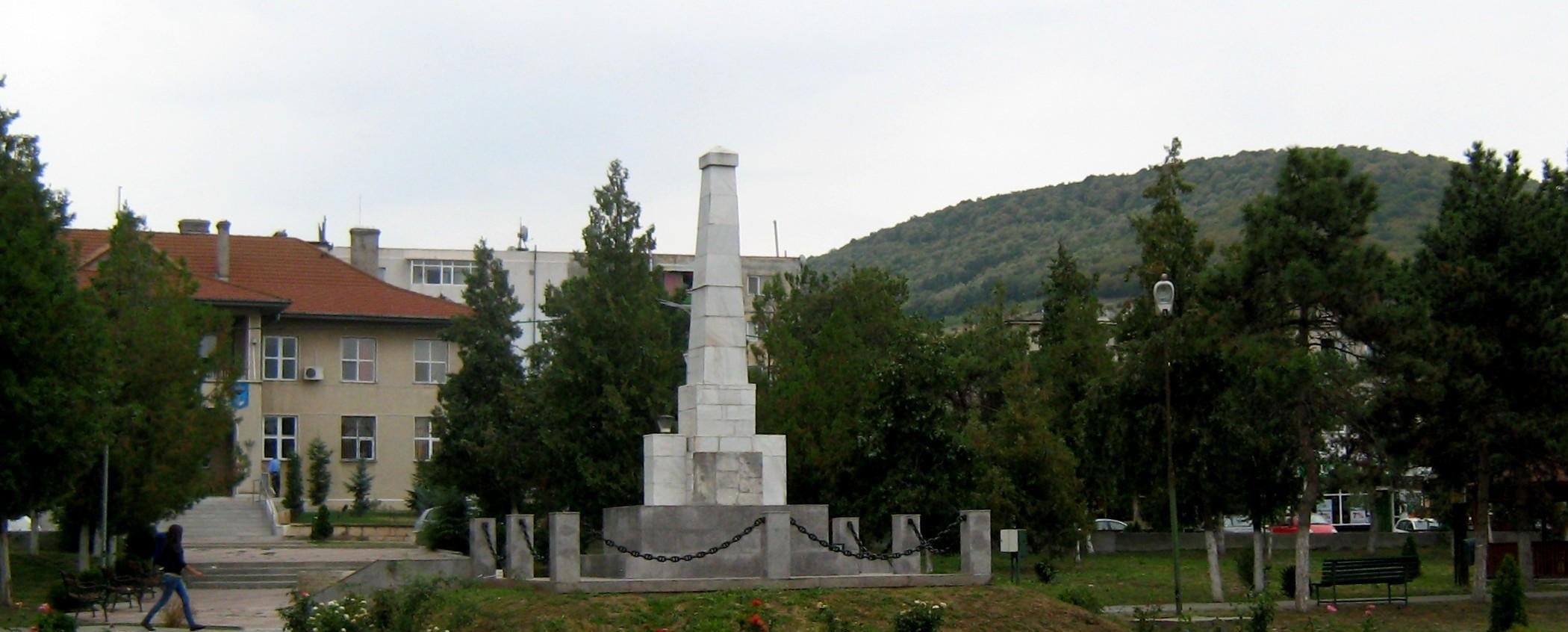
Park in Babadag

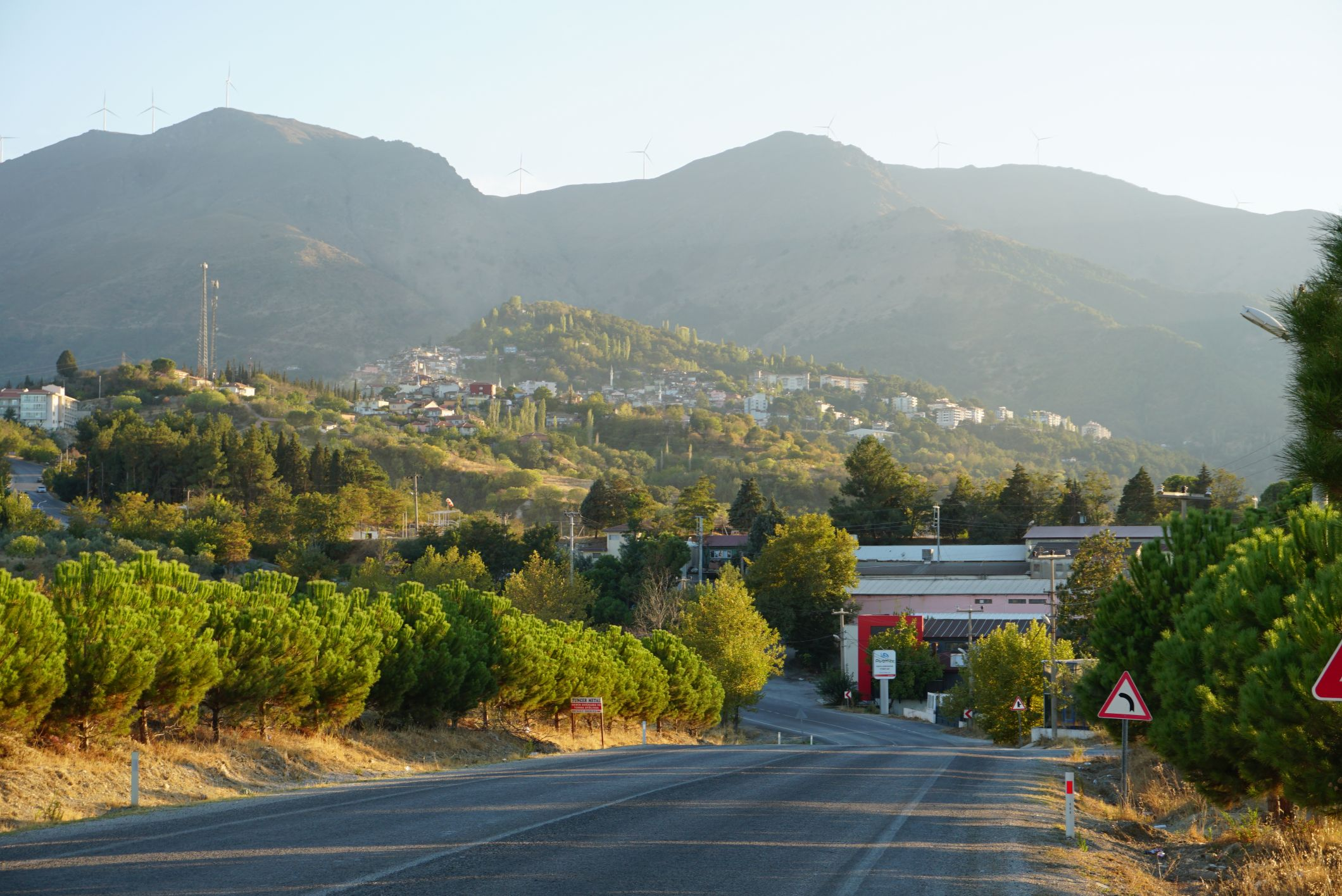
Northern access road
