= List of districts and neighborhoods in Pensacola, Florida =

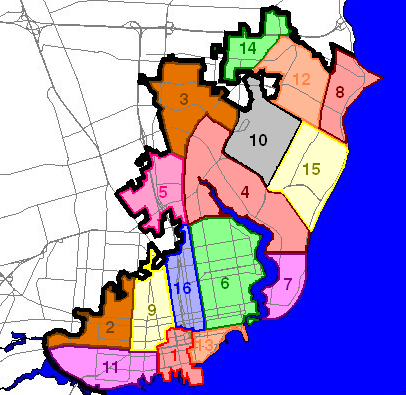
Pensacola neighborhoods

This is a list of neighborhoods and districts in Pensacola, Florida.

Pensacola is divided into 16 separate districts and almost 100 separate neighborhoods.

== Downtown Pensacola(1) ==
- Downtown Pensacola
- Historic Pensacola Village
- Historic Pensacola Village
- Port Royal
- Tanyard
- Belmont Devilliers
- Westside Garden District

== Baymarc(13) ==
- Neighbors of Seville
- Aragon
- Court St.Joe
- Seville Bayfront
- Carlton Palms
- Old East Hill
- East Hill

== Cervello(7) ==
- Cervello

- Truman Court
- Park Place
- Britton Place

== Renz-anna Villa(11) ==
- Renz-anna Villa

== Sunny Ridge(2) ==
- Roosevelt
- Devera Hills
- Gary Park
- Fiveash
- West Highlands
- Welles Brownsville (Brownsville)
- Walter Court
- Emerald Arms
- Benson Court

== Goulding(6) ==
Englewood Heights

- North Highlands
- North Hill
- Highlands
- Lakeview

== East Downtown(16) ==
Pinecrest Brainard Mcintyre Highlands Park Hazlehurst

== Woodland Heights(4) ==
- Camelia Court
- Blandford Place
- Brookside
- Duvon Heights
- Mac Pensacola
- Elite Plaza
- Cordova Collections
- Gloria Estates
- El Cerrito Place
- Douglas Square
- Cordova Park
- Inverness
- Cordova Farms
- Cordova Bluffs
- Texar Land
- Cordova Estates
- Birnam Woods
- Windermere

== Eastmount(5) ==
- Bilek Manor
- King George Estates
- Carriage Hills
- Villages at Marcus Lake
- Montclair
- Wildewood
- Oak Park
- Chanley Street Place
- Rosewood Terrace

== Brittany Forge(15) ==
- Brittany Forge
- Victoria Ation
- Dover Landing
- Riddick Estates
- Wentonia Estates
- Enchanting Oaks
- Hampton Court
- Ynche Clyffe
- La Chateau
- Sotogrande Villas

== La Mirage(8) ==
- Bay Village
- Woodcliff
- La Mirage
- Ironwood
- Bay Oak Villas
- Bay Oaks
- D'evereux
- Scenic Bluffs

== Briggs Manor(10) ==
- Burgess Court
- Grove
- Cordova West
- Briggs Manor
- To College Court
- Woodlore
- Reeces
- Fontana

== Kensington(14) ==
- Kensington
- East Gate
- Spanish Trace

== Regency Park(12) ==
- Regency Park
- Eastwood
- Baybrook
- Heritage Oaks
- Ramsgate
- Baybrook Unit
- Grandpointe

== Walden(3) ==
- Walden
- Plantation Park
