= José Otávio =

Brazilian bodyboarder

José Otavio, or Zé Otavio, is the given name of a Brazilian bodyboarder. He was born in the landlocked state of Minas Gerais. He started to surf in Guriri, Espírito Santo, and he developed his skills as a bodyboarder on the beaches of Niterói, in the state of Rio de Janeiro. Otavio has continued his career by surfing Brazil's most sought after bodyboarding waves at Itacoatiara beach. He was the first bodyboarder to execute a 720° reverse air spinner caught on tape, which can be seen in the bodyboarding video movie QUE! Mutação.

Otavio has been trained at Itacoatiara, Niterói. He is a first name when talking about Xtreme Bodyboard. He was Brazilian Champion Pro and second in the Pan American at 1997, ISA Games Champion at 1998, and 2x Rio de Janeiro's Pro Champion. He was the one Brazilian representative in Sumol Nazaré Special Edition 09, and he finished second in the event.
