= Warnock's dilemma =

Problem of interpreting a lack of response to a posting in a virtual community

Warnock's dilemma, named for its originator Bryan Warnock, is the problem of interpreting a lack of response to a posting in a virtual community. The term originally referred to mailing-list discussions, but has been applied to Usenet posts, blogs, web forums, and online content in general. The dilemma arises because a lack of response does not necessarily imply that no one is interested in the topic, but could also mean, for example, that readers find the content to be exceptionally good (leaving nothing for commenters to add).

On many internet forums, only around 1% of users create new posts, while 9% reply, and 90% are lurkers that do not contribute to the discussion. When no users reply, the original poster has no way of knowing what lurkers think of their contribution.

Warnock's dilemma leads to online writers and publishers adopting more provocative writing strategies in order to ensure that they will get a response. However, this can also lead publishers to avoid producing the kind of content that might fail to generate comments due to its high quality. This problem arises particularly with sites that focus on viral content, such as BuzzFeed and Huffington Post.

== Original description ==
Original description of the dilemma:

The problem with no response is that there are five possible interpretations:

1. The post is correct, well-written information that needs no follow-up commentary. There's nothing more to say except "Yeah, what he said."
2. The post is complete and utter nonsense, and no one wants to waste the energy or bandwidth to even point this out.
3. No one read the post, for whatever reason.
4. No one understood the post, but won't ask for clarification, for whatever reason.
5. No one cares about the post, for whatever reason.

— Bryan C. Warnock

Since Warnock's original description of the dilemma in August 2000, the expression has become used in the Perl world.

== See also ==
- Comments section
- Like button

== Sources ==
- Holiday, Ryan (2012). "Can't Stand the Silence". Trust Me, I'm Lying: Confessions of a Media Manipulator. Penguin. pp. 101–103. ISBN 978-1101583715.
