= Rare Book Room =

Educational website

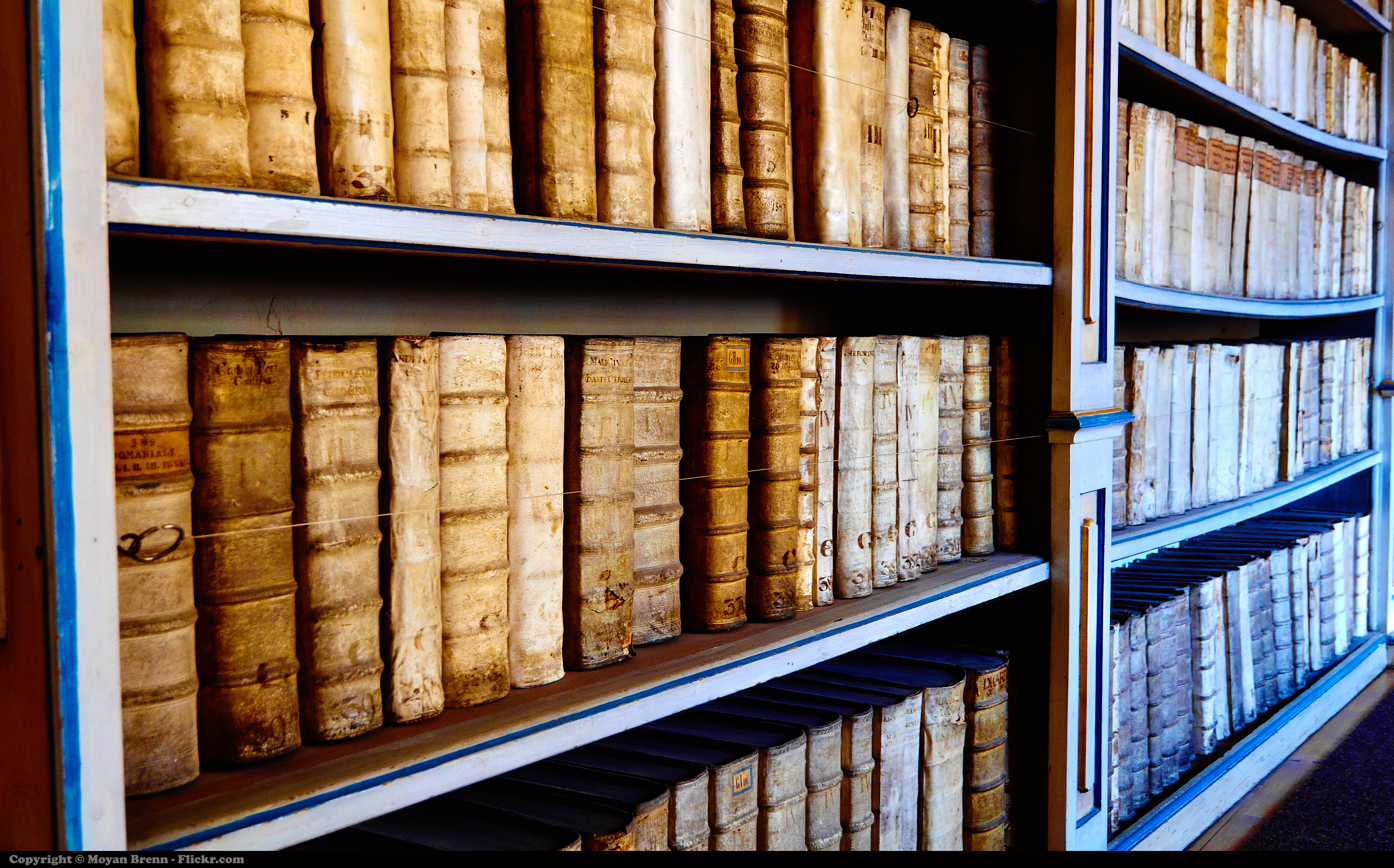
- Location: California, United States
- Established: 2006

Other information
- Website: www.rarebookroom.org

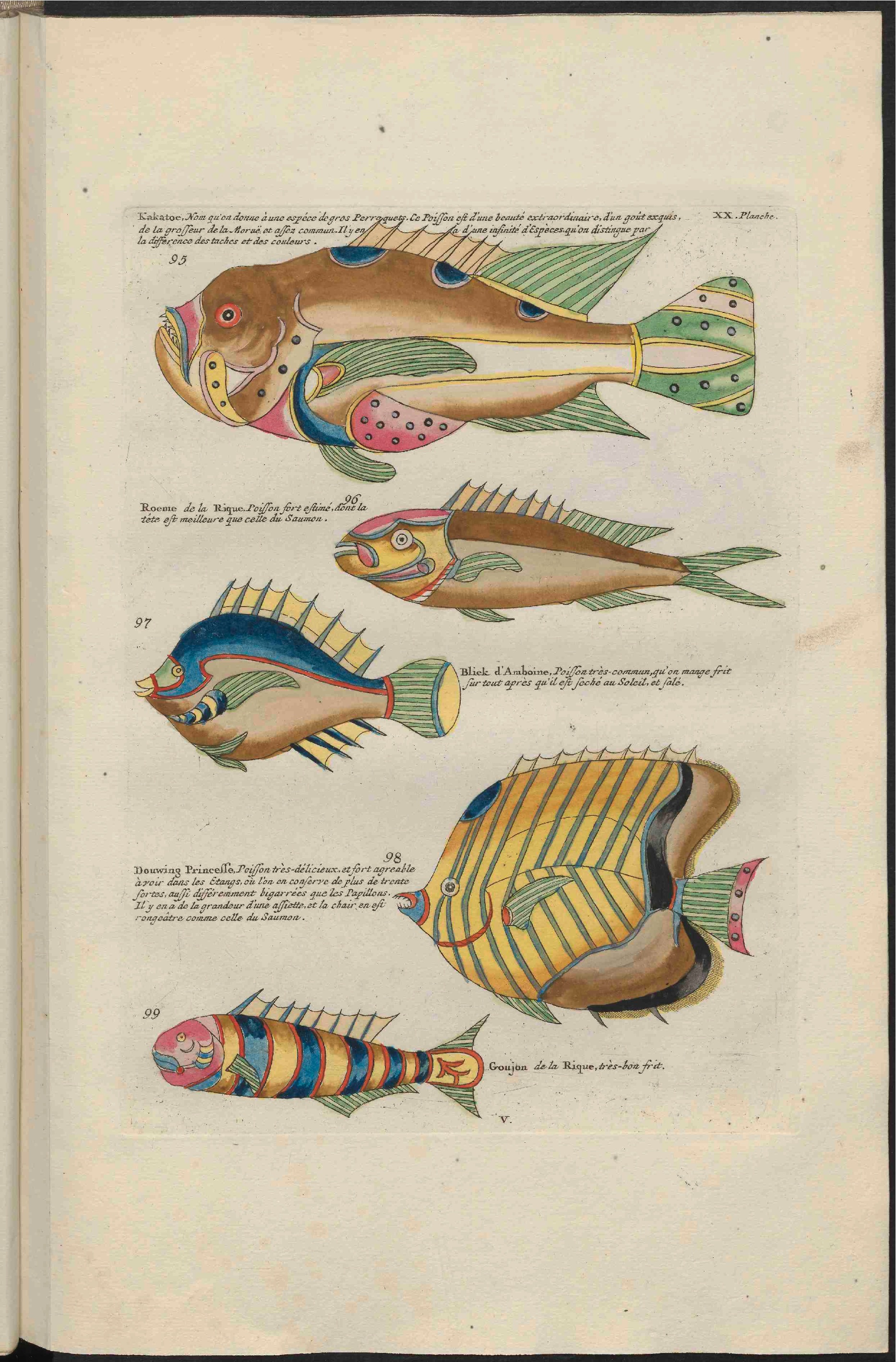
Louis Renard - Natural History

Rare Book Room is an educational website for the repository of digitally scanned rare books made freely available to the public.

== History ==
Starting around 1996 the California-based company Octavo began scanning rare and important books from libraries around the world. These scans were done at extremely high resolution using high-quality equipment, with some pages at over 200MB each. They were sold by Octavo as commercial products on CD-ROM.

In 2006 the "Rare Book Room" website was created which contains the complete collection in medium to medium-high resolution freely available to the public through a web browser or as a PDF file. Some high resolution versions are still being sold by Octavo through a separate website. As of 2007 over 400 books have been scanned.

== Collection ==
The repository includes books by:

- Euclid
- Xenophon
- Aristophanes
- Galileo Galilei,
- Isaac Newton,
- Nicolaus Copernicus,
- Johannes Kepler,
- Albert Einstein,
- Charles Darwin.
- William Shakespeare
- Benjamin Franklin

It includes most of the Shakespeare Quartos from the British Library, the Bodleian Library, the University of Edinburgh Library, and the National Library of Scotland, as well as the First Folio from the Folger Library. It includes Library of Congress copies of Poor Richard's Almanack by Benjamin Franklin, and other rare editions: a Gutenberg Bible of 1455, William Harvey's book on the circulation of blood, Galileo ’s Sidereus Nuncius, the first printing of the United States Bill of Rights, and Magna Carta.
