= Regents Park Estate =

- Location within Gauteng Location within South Africa
- Coordinates: 26.238°S 28.068°E
- Country: South Africa
- Province: Gauteng
- Municipality: City of Johannesburg
- Main Place: Johannesburg

Area
  - Total: 0.86 km^{2} (0.33 sq mi)

Population (2011)
  - Total: 5,703
  - Density: 6,600/km^{2} (17,000/sq mi)

Racial makeup (2011)
  - Black African: 76.3%
  - Coloured: 7.8%
  - Indian/Asian: 2.7%
  - White: 12.6%
  - Other: 0.7%

First languages (2011)
  - English: 29.2%
  - Zulu: 17.4%
  - Xhosa: 10.4%
  - Afrikaans: 6.9%
  - Other: 36.0%
- Time zone: UTC+2 (SAST)

Regents Park Estate is a suburb of Johannesburg, South Africa. It is located in Region F of the City of Johannesburg Metropolitan Municipality.
