= James Warnock (engineer) =

American electrical engineer

James Warnock is a former electrical engineer at the IBM Thomas J. Watson Research Corporation in Yorktown Heights, New York. He was named a Fellow of the Institute of Electrical and Electronics Engineers (IEEE) in 2012 for his contributions to the circuit design of high-performance microprocessors. He retired in 2017.
