= Jim Brady (boxer) =

Scottish boxer (1913–1980)

Personal information
- Born: 1913 Dundee, Scotland
- Died: 5 November 1980 (aged 67) Dundee, Scotland
- Weight: bantam/feather/lightweight

Boxing career

Boxing record
- Total fights: 106
- Wins: 56 (KO 22)
- Losses: 39 (KO 6)
- Draws: 11

Jim Brady (1913 – 5 November 1980) was a Scottish professional bantam, feather and lightweight boxer active from 1932 to 1947, who won the British (Southern (England) Area) Bantamweight Title, and British Empire bantamweight title, his professional fighting weight varied from 118 lb (54 kg; 8 st 6 lb), i.e. bantamweight to 129 lb (58.5 kg; 9 st 3.0 lb), i.e. lightweight. Brady was born in Dundee in 1913, and died in Dundee on 5 November 1980, at the age of 67.
