= Jimmy Warnock =

Irish boxer (1912–1987)

Personal information
- Nickname: Gloved Dynamite
- Nationality: British
- Born: James Warnock; 1912 Belfast, Ireland
- Died: 1987 (aged 74–75)
- Weight: Flyweight

Boxing career
- Stance: Southpaw

Boxing record
- Total fights: 85
- Wins: 64
- Win by KO: 24
- Losses: 15
- Draws: 6

James Warnock (1912 in Lurgan – 1987) was a southpaw boxer from the Shankill Road, Belfast, Ireland.

Jimmy Warnock began his early boxing career at Belfast's Chapel Fields in prize fights organised by Clara Copley. In the 1930s he beat undisputed world flyweight champion Benny Lynch on points twice - on 2 March 1936 at the King's Hall, Belfast and again on 2 June 1937 in front of 16,000 people in torrential rain at Parkhead stadium in Glasgow.

He was one of three boxing brothers, including Billy Warnock.
