= List of NYSAC world champions =

This is a list of NYSAC world champions, showing every world champion certified by the New York State Athletic Commission (NYSAC).

The NYSAC was established after the Frawley Law was enacted on July 26, 1911, which legalized the sport of boxing in the state of New York. As the first such commission established in the United States, the NYSAC became the preeminent boxing entity in the world, proceeding to recognize several reigning world champions with its own world title. Previously, champions were only recognized by "public acclamation," and the NYSAC title was thus a way for champions to have official recognition. The first champions to be recognized by the NYSAC were lineal heavyweight champion Jack Johnson and lineal bantamweight champion Johnny Coulon, who were awarded their titles in August 1911. Over the next few years, the NYSAC crowned champions in the lightweight, middleweight, and light-heavyweight divisions.

On May 13, 1917, the Frawley Law was repealed by the Slater bill, leading to the disbandment of the NYSAC and a temporary end to their championship lineages. The Walker Law, signed into law on May 24, 1920, made boxing legal again in New York, and the NYSAC and its championship lineages were reestablished. During its second incarnation, the NYSAC also recognized champions in the flyweight, junior-featherweight, junior-lightweight, junior-welterweight, and welterweight divisions, though the junior-featherweight title lasted for little more than a year while the junior-featherweight division was discontinued in 1929; the flyweight title remained vacant after 1938.

By 1963, the NYSAC had come under the auspices of the newly created World Boxing Council (WBC), which saw a gradual phasing out of the NYSAC's titles as the WBC inaugurated its own title lineages. The last champion to be recognized by the NYSAC was Hedgemon Lewis, who continued to hold his title until August 3, 1974, after losing an undisputed title bout with WBC champion José Nápoles.

Most consecutive title defenses

== Heavyweight ==
No.	Name	Reign	Defenses
1	Jack Johnson (awarded inaugural title)	Aug 1911 – 5 April 1915	3
2	Jess Willard	5 April 1915 – 14 Nov 1917	0
Frawley Law was overturned and boxing was banned again in New York.
3	Jack Dempsey (awarded title)	25 Mar 1920 – 23 Sep 1926	5
4	Gene Tunney	23 Sep 1926 – 31 Jul 1928	2
Tunney retired.
5	Max Schmeling (def. Jack Sharkey)	12 Jun 1930 – 6 Jan 1931	0
Schmeling was stripped of the title for refusing to face Sharkey in a rematch.
6	Max Schmeling (2) (restored as champion)	22 Jan 1932 – 21 Jun 1932	0
7	Jack Sharkey	21 Jun 1932 – 29 Jun 1933	0
8	Primo Carnera	29 Jun 1933 – 14 Jun 1934	1
9	Max Baer	14 Jun 1934 – 13 Jun 1935	0
10	James J. Braddock	13 Jun 1935 – 22 Jun 1937	0
11	Joe Louis	22 Jun 1937 – 28 Feb 1949	25
Louis vacated the title and retired, but would come back a year later to fight Ezzard Charles.
12	Ezzard Charles (def. Joe Louis)	27 Sep 1950 – 18 Jul 1951	4
13	Jersey Joe Walcott	18 Jul 1951 – 23 Sep 1952	1
14	Rocky Marciano	23 Sep 1952 – 27 Apr 1956	6
Marciano retired.
15	Floyd Patterson (def. Archie Moore)	30 Nov 1956 – 26 Jun 1959	3
16	Ingemar Johansson	26 Jun 1959 – 20 Jun 1960	0
17	Floyd Patterson (2)	20 Jun 1960 – 25 Sep 1962	2
18	Sonny Liston	25 Sep 1962 – 25 Feb 1964	1
19	Muhammad Ali	25 Feb 1964 – 28 Apr 1967	9
Ali was stripped of the title due to his refusal to be drafted to Army service.
20	Joe Frazier (def. Buster Mathis)	4 Mar 1968 – 16 Feb 1970	5
Joe Frazier won the vacant WBC heavyweight title by defeating Jimmy Ellis; NYSAC heavyweight title was then discontinued.

== Light heavyweight ==
No.	Name	Reign	Defenses
1	Bob Moha (awarded inaugural title)	Aug 1913 – 15 Jun 1914	2
2	Jack Dillon	15 Jun 1914 – 24 Oct 1916	3
3	Battling Levinsky	24 Oct 1916 – 14 Nov 1917	1
3	Frawley Law was overturned and boxing was banned again in New York.		
3	Battling Levinsky – restored as champion	25 Mar – 12 Oct 1920	1
4	Georges Carpentier (def. Battling Levinsky)	12 Oct 1920 – 24 Sep 1922	1
5	Battling Siki	24 Sep 1922 – 17 Mar 1923	0
6	Mike McTigue	17 Mar 1923 – 30 May 1925	1
7	Paul Berlenbach	30 May 1925 – 16 Jul 1926	3
8	Jack Delaney	16 July 1926 – 26 July 1927	1
Delaney vacated the title to move up to the heavyweight division.
9	Mike McTigue (awarded title)	26 July 1927 – 7 Oct 1927	0
10	Tommy Loughran	7 Oct 1927 – 3 Sep 1929	6
Loughran vacated the title to move up to the heavyweight division.
11	Jimmy Slattery (def. Lou Scozza)	10 Feb 1930 – 25 Jun 1930	0
12	Maxie Rosenbloom	25 Jun 1930 – 16 Nov 1934	7
13	Bob Olin	16 Nov 1934 – 31 Oct 1935	0
14	John Henry Lewis	31 Oct 1935 – 28 Jul 1938	5
Lewis was stripped of the title for refusing to fight Tiger Jack Fox.
15	Melio Bettina (def. Tiger Jack Fox)	3 Feb 1939 – 13 Jul 1939	0
16	Billy Conn	13 Jul 1939 – 3 Jun 1941	3
Conn vacated the title to move up to the heavyweight division.
17	Gus Lesnevich (def. Tami Mauriello)	26 Aug 1941 – 26 Jul 1948	4
18	Freddie Mills	26 Jul 1948 – 24 Jan 1950	0
19	Joey Maxim	24 Jan 1950 – 17 Dec 1952	2
20	Archie Moore	17 Dec 1952 – 12 May 1962	9
Moore was stripped of the title.
21	Harold Johnson (def. Doug Jones)	12 May 1962 – 14 Feb 1963	1
Harold Johnson was awarded the inaugural WBC light-heavyweight title; NYSAC light-heavyweight title was then discontinued.

== Middleweight ==
No.	Name	Reign	Defenses
1	Frank Klaus (def. Georges Carpentier for inaugural title)	24 Jun 1912 – 11 Oct 1913	1
2	George Chip	11 Oct 1913 – 7 Apr 1914	5
3	Al McCoy	7 Apr 1914 – 14 Nov 1917	7
4	Mike O'Dowd	14 Nov 1917	0
4	Frawley Law was overturned and boxing was banned again in New York.		
4	Mike O'Dowd – restored as champion	25 Mar – 6 May 1920	0
5	Johnny Wilson	6 May 1920 – 21 Jun 1922	4
Wilson was stripped of the title for refusing to defend against Harry Greb.
6	Dave Rosenberg	14 Aug – 30 Nov 1922	0
7	Mike O'Dowd (2)	30 Nov 1922 – 16 Mar 1923	0
8	Jock Malone	16 Mar – 12 Apr 1923	0
Johnny Wilson reinstated as champion.
9	Johnny Wilson (2)	12 Apr – 31 Aug 1923	1
10	Harry Greb	31 Aug 1923 – 25 Feb 1926	4
11	Tiger Flowers	25 Feb – 3 Dec 1926	1
12	Mickey Walker	3 Dec 1926 – 31 Jan 1931	3
Walker vacated the title to move up to heavyweight.
13	Ben Jeby (def. Frank Battaglia)	13 Jan – 9 Aug 1933	2
14	Lou Brouillard	9 Aug – 30 Oct 1933	1
15	Vince Dundee	30 Oct 1933 – 11 Sep 1934	2
16	Teddy Yarosz	11 Sep 1934 – 19 Sep 1935	0
17	Eddie Babe Risko	19 Sep 1935 – 11 Jul 1936	1
18	Freddie Steele	11 Jul 1936 – May 1938	5
Steele was stripped of the title for refusing to fight Fred Apostoli.
19	Fred Apostoli (def. Young Corbett III)	11 Nov 1938 – 2 Oct 1939	0
20	Ceferino Garcia	2 Oct 1939 – 23 May 1940	1
21	Ken Overlin	23 May 1940 – 9 May 1941	2
22	Billy Soose	9 May – Nov 1941	0
Soose vacated title to move up to light heavyweight.
23	Tony Zale (def. Georgie Abrams)	28 Nov 1941 – 16 Jul 1947	1
The title was declared "in abeyance" after Zale lost to Rocky Graziano, who was not eligible to win the title.
24	Tony Zale (2) (def. Rocky Graziano)	10 Jun – 21 Sep 1948	0
25	Marcel Cerdan	21 Sep 1948 – 16 Jun 1949	0
26	Jake LaMotta	16 Jun 1949 – 14 Feb 1951	2
27	Sugar Ray Robinson	14 Feb – 10 Jul 1951	0
28	Randolph Turpin	10 Jul – 12 Sep 1951	0
29	Sugar Ray Robinson (2)	12 Sep 1951 – 4 Dec 1952	2
Robinson was stripped of the title for a lack of defenses before temporarily retiring on December 19.
30	Bobo Olson (def. Randy Turpin)	21 Oct 1953 – 9 Dec 1955	3
31	Sugar Ray Robinson (3)	9 Dec 1955 – 2 Jan 1957	1
32	Gene Fullmer	2 Jan – 1 May 1957	0
33	Sugar Ray Robinson (4)	1 May – 23 Sep 1957	0
34	Carmen Basilio	23 Sep 1957 – 25 Mar 1958	0
35	Sugar Ray Robinson (5)	25 Mar 1958 – 2 Jan 1960	0
36	Paul Pender (def. Carmen Basilio)	2 Jan 1960 – 11 Jul 1961	3
37	Terry Downes	11 Jul 1961 – 7 Apr 1962	0
38	Paul Pender (2)	7 Apr – 9 Nov 1962	0
Pender was stripped of title due to a lack of defenses.
39	Dick Tiger (awarded title)	9 Nov 1962 – 10 Aug 1963	1
Dick Tiger won the inaugural WBC middleweight title after defeating Gene Fullmer; NYSAC middleweight title was then discontinued.

== Welterweight ==
No.	Name	Reign	Defenses
1	Jack Britton (awarded inaugural title)	25 Mar 1920 – 1 Nov 1922	9
2	Mickey Walker	1 Nov 1922 – 6 Jun 1923	1
Walker was stripped of title for failing to fight Dave Shade within six months.
3	Dave Shade (awarded title)	6 Jun – 27 Jul 1923	0
4	Jimmy Jones	27 Jul – 8 Oct 1923	0
Jones was stripped of title for fighting Mickey Walker, who was banned by the NYSAC at the time; Walker was then reinstated on October 31.
5	Mickey Walker (2) (awarded title)	31 Oct 1923 – 20 May 1926	1
6	Pete Latzo	20 May 1926 – 3 Jun 1927	2
7	Joe Dundee	3 Jun 1927 – 25 Jul 1929	1
8	Jackie Fields	25 Jul 1929 – 9 May 1930	0
9	Jack Thompson	9 May – 5 Sep 1930	0
10	Tommy Freeman	5 Sep 1930 – 14 Apr 1931	0
11	Jack Thompson (2)	14 Apr – 23 Oct 1931	0
12	Lou Brouillard	23 Oct 1931 – 28 Jan 1932	0
13	Jackie Fields (2)	28 Jan 1932 – 22 Feb 1933	0
14	Young Corbett III	22 Feb – 29 May 1933	0
15	Jimmy McLarnin	29 May 1933 – 28 May 1934	0
16	Barney Ross	28 May – 17 Sep 1934	0
17	Jimmy McLarnin (2)	17 Sep 1934 – 28 May 1935	0
18	Barney Ross (2)	28 May 1935 – 31 May 1938	2
19	Henry Armstrong	31 May 1938 – 4 Oct 1940	19
20	Fritzie Zivic	4 Oct 1940 – 29 Jul 1941	1
21	Freddie Cochrane	29 Jul 1941 – 1 Feb 1946	0
22	Marty Servo	1 Feb – 3 Sep 1946	0
Servo was stripped of the title for failing to defend against Sugar Ray Robinson before temporarily retiring on September 25.
23	Sugar Ray Robinson (def. Tommy Bell)	20 Dec 1946 – 14 Feb 1951	5
Robinson vacated the title to move up to middleweight.
24	Kid Gavilán (def. Johnny Bratton)	18 May 1951 – 20 Oct 1954	7
25	Johnny Saxton	20 Oct 1954 – 1 Apr 1955	0
26	Tony DeMarco	1 Apr – 10 Jun 1955	0
27	Carmen Basilio	10 Jun 1955 – 14 Mar 1956	0
28	Johnny Saxton (2)	14 Mar – 12 Sep 1956	0
29	Carmen Basilio (2)	12 Sep 1956 – 23 Sep 1957	1
Basilio vacated the title after winning the middleweight title.
30	Virgil Akins (def. Vince Martinez)	6 Jun – 5 Dec 1958	0
31	Don Jordan	5 Dec 1958 – 27 May 1960	2
32	Benny Paret	27 May 1960 – 1 Apr 1961	1
33	Emile Griffith	1 Apr – 30 Sep 1961	1
34	Benny Paret (2)	30 Sep 1961 – 24 Mar 1962	0
35	Emile Griffith (2)	24 Mar 1962 – 21 Mar 1963	2
36	Luis Manuel Rodríguez	21 Mar – 8 Jun 1963	0
37	Emile Griffith (3)	8 Jun 1963 – 1 Aug 1966	5
Griffith was stripped of the title after losing a lawsuit to retain his title.
38	Curtis Cokes (def. Manuel González)	24 Aug 1966 – 18 Apr 1969	5
39	José Nápoles	18 Apr 1969 – 3 Dec 1970	3
40	Billy Backus	3 Dec 1970 – 4 Jun 1971	0
41	José Nápoles (2)	4 Jun – 1 Nov 1971	0
Nápoles was stripped of his NYSAC title for refusing to fight Backus in a rematch.
42	Hedgemon Lewis (def. Billy Backus)	16 Jun 1972 – 3 Aug 1974	1
Recognized as the "US Champion" by The Ring as of July 27, 1974, Lewis lost an undisputed championship bout against José Nápoles; NYSAC welterweight title was then discontinued.

== Junior welterweight ==
No.	Name	Reign	Defenses
1	Pinky Mitchell (awarded inaugural title; dubious recognition) (Note: While he was inaugurated by the NBA as the first champion of this division, there are no contemporary reports that confirm or deny if he was also recognized by the NYSAC.)	22 Nov 1922 – Aug 1925	0
Mitchell loses a non-title bout to Willie Harmon on 14 August 1925; appears to vacate by moving up to welterweight while Harmon claims the title.
2	Willie Harmon (claimed title) (Note: Harmon had also previously defeated rival claimant Paul Doyle on April 8, 1924.)	14 Aug 1925 – Aug 1926	0
Recognition was given back to Mitchell.
3	Pinky Mitchell (2) (restored as champion)	Aug 1926 – 21 Sep 1926	0
4	Mushy Callahan	21 Sep 1926 – 18 Feb 1930	1
5	Jack Kid Berg	18 Feb 1930 – 24 Apr 1931	8
6	Tony Canzoneri	24 Apr 1931 – 18 Jan 1932	3
7	Johnny Jadick	18 Jan 1932 – 6 February 1933	1
Jadick vacated the title to move down to lightweight; junior welterweight was then temporarily retired as a weight class by the NYSAC.
8	Tippy Larkin (def. Willie Joyce)	29 Apr – 5 Nov 1946	1
Larkin vacated the title to move up to welterweight.
9	Carlos Ortiz (def. Kenny Lane)	12 Jun 1959 – 1 Sep 1960	2
10	Duilio Loi	1 Sep 1960 – 14 Sep 1962	2
11	Eddie Perkins	14 Sep 1962 – 15 Dec 1962	0
12	Duilio Loi (2)	15 Dec 1962 – 24 Jan 1963	0
Loi vacated the title and retired from boxing; NYSAC junior-welterweight title was then discontinued.

== Lightweight ==
No.	Name	Reign	Defenses
1	Benny Leonard (def. Freddie Welsh for inaugural title)	May 28 – 14 Nov 1917	1
1	Frawley Law was overturned and boxing was banned again in New York.		
1	Benny Leonard – restored as champion	25 Mar 1920 – 15 Jan 1925	6
Leonard temporarily retired.
2	Jimmy Goodrich (def. Stanislaus Loayza)	13 Jul – 7 Dec 1925	0
3	Rocky Kansas	7 Dec 1925 – 3 Jul 1926	0
4	Sammy Mandell	3 Jul 1926 – 17 Jul 1930	5
5	Al Singer	17 Jul – 14 Nov 1930	0
6	Tony Canzoneri	14 Nov 1930 – 23 Jun 1933	4
7	Barney Ross	23 Jun 1933 – 15 Apr 1935	1
Ross vacated the title to move up to super lightweight.
8	Tony Canzoneri (2) (def. Lou Ambers)	10 May 1935 – 3 Sep 1936	1
9	Lou Ambers	3 Sep 1936 – 17 Aug 1938	2
10	Henry Armstrong	17 Aug 1938 – 22 Aug 1939	1
11	Lou Ambers (2)	22 Aug 1939 – 10 May 1940	0
12	Lew Jenkins	10 May 1940 – 19 Dec 1941	1
13	Sammy Angott	19 Dec 1941 – 14 Nov 1942	1
Angott temporarily retired.
14	Beau Jack (def. Tippy Larkin)	18 Dec 1942 – 21 May 1943	0
15	Bob Montgomery	21 May – 19 Nov 1943	0
16	Beau Jack (2)	19 Nov 1943 – 3 Mar 1944	0
17	Bob Montgomery (2)	3 Mar 1944 – 4 Aug 1947	2
18	Ike Williams	4 Aug 1947 – 25 May 1951	5
19	Jimmy Carter	25 May 1951 – 14 May 1952	2
20	Lauro Salas	14 May – 15 Oct 1952	0
21	Jimmy Carter (2)	15 Oct 1952 – 5 Mar 1954	3
22	Paddy DeMarco	5 Mar – 17 Nov 1954	0
23	Jimmy Carter (3)	17 Nov 1954 – 29 Jun 1955	0
24	Wallace Bud Smith	29 Jun 1955 – 24 Aug 1956	1
25	Joe Brown	24 Aug 1956 – 21 Apr 1962	11
26	Carlos Ortiz	21 Apr 1962 – 7 Apr 1963	1
Carlos Ortiz won the inaugural WBC lightweight title after defeating Douglas Vaillant; NYSAC lightweight title was then discontinued.

== Junior lightweight ==
No.	Name	Reign	Defenses
1	Johnny Dundee (def. George Chaney)	18 Nov 1921 – 30 May 1923	3
2	Jack Bernstein	30 May – 17 Dec 1923	1
3	Johnny Dundee (2)	17 Dec 1923 – 20 Jun 1924	0
4	Steve Sullivan	20 Jun 1924 – 1 Apr 1925	2
5	Mike Ballerino	1 Apr – 2 Dec 1925	1
6	Tod Morgan	2 Dec 1925 – 19 Dec 1929	12
7	Benny Bass	19 Dec – 31 Dec 1929	0
Bass was stripped of the title due to suspicions of fight-fixing; junior lightweight was then discontinued as a weight class by the NYSAC.

== Featherweight ==
No.	Name	Reign	Defenses
1	Johnny Kilbane (awarded inaugural title)	25 Mar 1920 – 21 Jun 1922	1
Kilbane was stripped of the title for failing to defend against Johnny Dundee.
2	Johnny Dundee (def. Danny Frush)	15 Aug 1922 – May 1923	0
Dundee was stripped of the title after Kilbane was restored to champion.
3	Johnny Kilbane (2) (restored as champion)	May – 2 Jun 1923	0
4	Eugène Criqui	2 Jun – 26 Jul 1923	0
5	Johnny Dundee (2)	26 Jul 1923 – 20 Aug 1924	0
Dundee vacated the title to stay at super featherweight.
6	Kid Kaplan (def. Danny Kramer)	2 Jan 1925 – 6 Jul 1926	3
Kaplan vacated the title in order to fight at heavier weights.
7	Tony Canzoneri (def. Johnny Dundee)	24 Oct 1927 – 28 Sep 1928	1
8	André Routis	28 Sep 1928 – 23 Sep 1929	1
9	Christopher Battalino	23 Sep 1929 – 8 Jan 1932	5
Battalino was stripped of the title for failing to make weight in a scheduled title defense against Lew Feldman.
10	Kid Chocolate (def. Lew Feldman)	13 Oct 1932 – 19 Feb 1934	2
Chocolate was stripped due to inactivity.
11	Baby Arizmendi (def. Mike Belloise)	30 Aug 1934 – 19 May 1936	0
Arizmendi was stripped of the title for failing to defend against Mike Belloise.
12	Mike Belloise (awarded title after previously defeating Everett Rightmire)	19 May 1936 – 10 Aug 1937	1
Belloise was stripped after a bout of pneumonia left him unable to defend in a timely manner.
13	Henry Armstrong (def. Petey Sarron)	29 Oct 1937 – 12 Sep 1938	0
Armstrong vacated the title to stay at the higher weight divisions.
14	Joey Archibald (def. Mike Belloise)	17 Oct 1938 – 20 May 1940	2
15	Harry Jeffra	20 May 1940 – 12 May 1941	1
16	Joey Archibald (2)	12 May – 11 Sep 1941	0
17	Chalky Wright	11 Sep 1941 – 20 Nov 1942	2
18	Willie Pep	20 Nov 1942 – 29 Oct 1948	6
19	Sandy Saddler	29 Oct 1948 – 11 Feb 1949	0
20	Willie Pep (2)	11 Feb 1949 – 8 Sep 1950	3
21	Sandy Saddler (2)	8 Sep 1950 – 21 Jan 1957	3
Saddler retired.
22	Hogan Bassey (def. Cherif Hamia)	24 Jun 1957 – 18 Mar 1959	1
23	Davey Moore	18 Mar 1959 – 21 Mar 1963	5
24	Sugar Ramos	21 Mar 1963	0
Ramos also won the inaugural WBC featherweight title upon defeating Moore; NYSAC featherweight title was then discontinued.

== Junior featherweight ==
No.	Name	Reign	Defenses
1	Jack "Kid" Wolfe (def. Joe Lynch)	21 Sep 1922 – 29 Aug 1923	0
2	Carl Duane	29 Aug 1923 – November 1923	0
Duane vacated title to move up to featherweight; junior featherweight was then discontinued as a weight class by the NYSAC.

== Bantamweight ==
No.	Name	Reign	Defenses
1	Johnny Coulon (awarded inaugural title)	18 Aug 1911 – 9 Jun 1914	8
2	Kid Williams	9 Jun 1914 – 10 Sep 1915	2
2	Williams lost a title match to Johnny Ertle on a foul, but the NYSAC continued to officially recognize Williams as champion while allowing Ertle to claim the title.		
2	Kid Williams – official recognition	10 Sep 1915 – 9 Jan 1917	4
3	Johnny Ertle (unofficial recognition)	10 Sep 1915 – 9 Jan 1917	11
Pete Herman defeated Kid Williams to earn official recognition as NYSAC champion.
4	Pete Herman	9 Jan 1917 – 14 Nov 1917	1
4	Frawley Law was overturned and boxing was banned again in New York.		
4	Pete Herman – restored as champion	25 Mar 1920 – 22 Dec 1920	0
5	Joe Lynch	22 Dec 1920 – 25 Jul 1921	1
6	Pete Herman (2)	25 July – 23 Sep 1921	0
7	Johnny Buff	23 Sep 1921 – 10 Jul 1922	1
8	Joe Lynch (2)	10 Jul 1922 – 19 Oct 1923	3
Lynch was stripped of the title for refusing to fight Joe Burman.
9	Joe Burman (awarded title)	19 Oct 1923	0
10	Abe Goldstein	19 Oct 1923 – 19 Dec 1924	4
11	Eddie Martin	19 Dec 1924 – 20 Mar 1925	1
12	Charlie Phil Rosenberg	20 Mar 1925 – 4 Feb 1927	2
Despite successfully defending against Bushy Graham, the NYSAC stripped Rosenberg of his title for being over the weight limit.
13	Bushy Graham (def. Isadore Schwartz)	23 May 1928 – Jan 1929	0
Graham was stripped of the title at some point.
14	Panamá Al Brown (def. Gregorio Vidal)	18 Jun 1929 – 27 Mar 1934	9
Brown was suspended by the NYSAC and subsequently stripped of his title for failing to fight Baby Casanova.
15	Louis Salica (def. Sixto Escobar)	26 Aug – 15 Nov 1935	0
16	Sixto Escobar	15 Nov 1935 – 23 Sep 1937	3
17	Harry Jeffra	23 Sep 1937 – 20 Feb 1938	0
18	Sixto Escobar (2)	20 Feb 1938 – 27 Oct 1939	1
Escobar vacated the title to move up to featherweight.
19	Louis Salica (2) (def. Tony Olivera)	17 Nov 1939 – 15 Dec 1942	4
Salica was stripped of the title for failing to defend it in six months.
20	Manuel Ortiz (def. Louis Salica)	10 Mar 1943 – 6 Jan 1947	12
21	Harold Dade	6 Jan – 11 Mar 1947	0
22	Manuel Ortiz (2)	11 Mar 1947 – 31 May 1950	4
23	Vic Toweel	31 May 1950 – 15 Nov 1952	3
24	Jimmy Carruthers	15 Nov 1952 – 3 May 1954	3
Carruthers retired from boxing.
25	Robert Cohen (def. Chamroen Songkitrat)	19 Sep 1954 – 29 Jun 1956	1
25	Mario D'Agata	29 Jun 1956 – 1 Apr 1957	0
26	Alphonse Halimi	1 Apr 1957 – 8 Jul 1959	1
27	José Becerra	8 Jul 1959 – 30 Aug 1960	2
Becerra temporarily retired due to an eye injury after losing a non-title bout to Eloy Sánchez.
28	Éder Jofre (def. Johnny Caldwell)	18 Jan 1962 – 4 Apr 1963	2
Éder Jofre won the inaugural WBC bantamweight title after defeating Katsutoshi Aoki; NYSAC bantamweight title was then discontinued.

== Flyweight ==
No.	Name	Reign	Defenses
1	Pancho Villa (def. Jimmy Wilde)	18 Jun 1923 – 14 Jul 1925	3
Title vacated because Villa died from Ludwig's angina resulting from an infection that spread to his throat.
2	Frankie Genaro (awarded title)	15 Jul 1925 — 22 Aug 1925	0
3	Fidel LaBarba	22 Aug 1925 – 25 Aug 1927	2
LaBarba retired.
4	Corporal Izzy Schwartz (def. Newsboy Brown)	16 Dec 1927 — 22 Aug 1929	3
5	Willie LaMorte	22 Aug – 3 Sep 1929	0
LaMorte was stripped of the title after the NYSAC learned that Phil Bernstein managed both La Morte and Schwartz; LaMorte continued to claim the title until his defeat to Midget Wolgast on May 16, 1930.
6	Midget Wolgast (def. Eladio Valdés)	21 Mar 1930 – 16 Sep 1935	3
7	Small Montana	16 Sep 1935 – 19 Jan 1937	1
8	Benny Lynch	19 Jan 1937 – 29 Jun 1938	1
Lynch vacated the title due to being unable to make the flyweight limit; NYSAC flyweight title was then discontinued.

== See also ==
- List of undisputed boxing champions
- List of WBC world champions
- List of WBA world champions
- List of IBF world champions
- List of WBO world champions
- List of The Ring world champions
