= Frankie Covelli =

American boxer

Personal information
- Nationality: American
- Born: Frankie Covelli; May 4, 1913 Brooklyn, New York, U.S.
- Died: February 16, 2003 (aged 89) Chicago, Illinois, U.S.
- Weight: Featherweight

Boxing career
- Stance: Orthodox

Boxing record
- Total fights: 157
- Wins: 94
- Win by KO: 19
- Losses: 40
- Draws: 22
- No contests: 1

Frankie Covelli (May 4, 1913 – February 16, 2003 ) was an American boxer from Brooklyn New York.

== Life ==
Covelli began boxing in 1929. Among other notable fighters, he fought Freddie Miller two times, losing both bouts by decision, and also lost to Henry Armstrong. He held Baby Arizmendi to a draw. Covelli fought Willie Joyce twice. The first fight he lost by decision but won the second fight by a decision. He also defeated former bantamweight champion Sixto Escobar.

In Covelli's only title fight he lost to Petey Scalzo for the National Boxing Association featherweight title by TKO at Griffith Stadium in 1940. He retired from boxing later that year.
