= Douglas Jones =

Douglas Jones may refer to:

- Douglas C. Jones (1924–1998), American author of historical fiction
- Douglas L. Jones, American professor in electrical and computer engineering at the University of Illinois
- Douglas R. Jones (1919-2005), Anglican priest, British biblical scholar, Lightfoot Professor of Divinity at Durham University.
- Douglas Jones (mathematician) (1922–2013), British mathematician
- Douglas Jones, former editor of Credenda/Agenda
- Douglas W. Jones (born c. 1950), American computer scientist and electronic voting expert

== See also ==
- Doug Jones (disambiguation)
- List of people with surname Jones
