= Baby Arizmendi =

Mexican boxer (1914–1962)

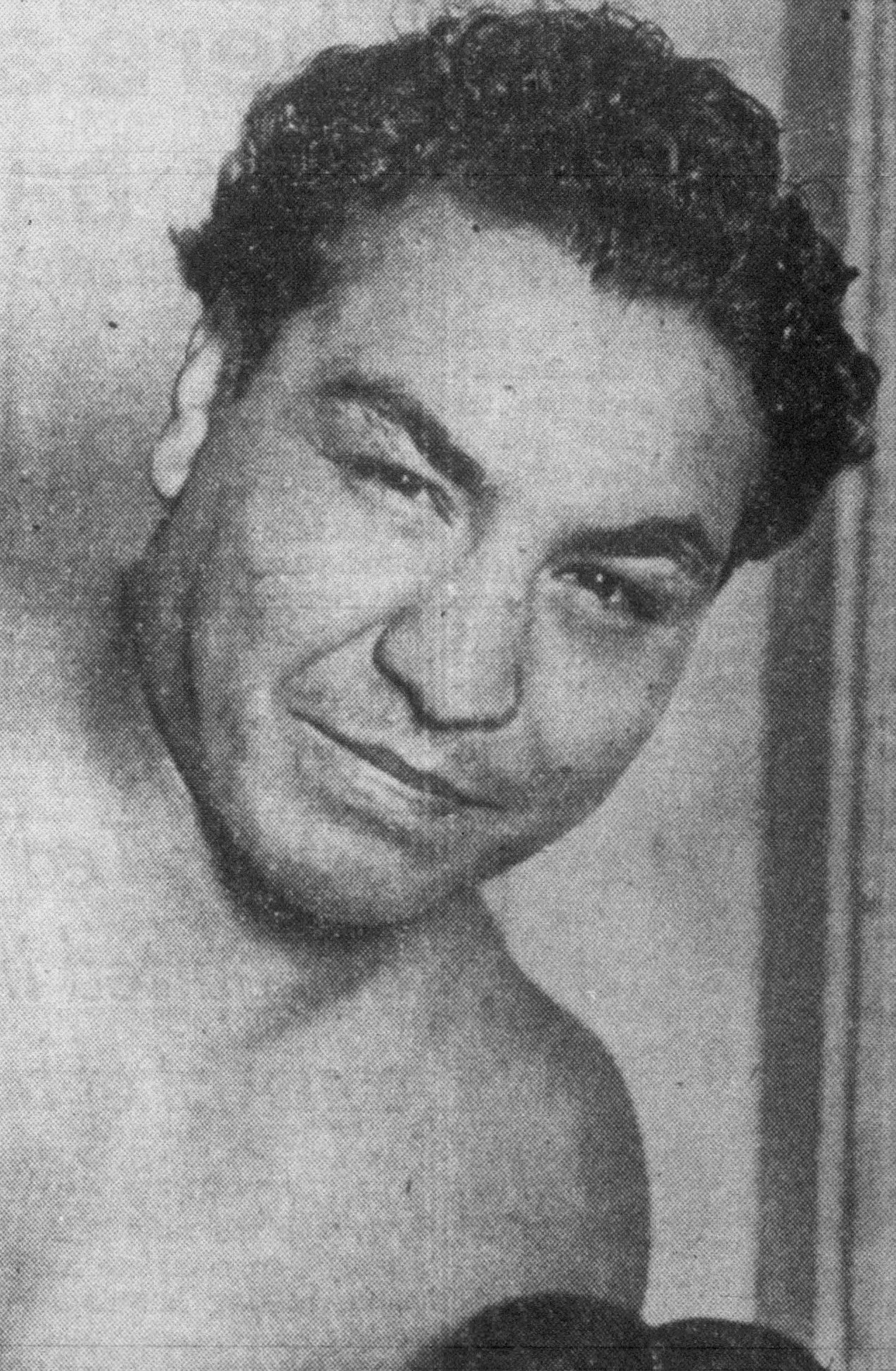
- Arizmendi, circa 1942

Personal information
- Nickname: "Baby"
- Born: Alberto Arizmendi; March 17, 1914 Torreón, Coahuila, Mexico
- Died: December 31, 1963 (aged 49) Los Angeles, California, U.S.
- Height: 5 ft 4.5 in (1.64 m)
- Weight: Bantamweight, Featherweight, Welterweight

Boxing career
- Stance: Orthodox

Boxing record
- Total fights: 138
- Wins: 93
- Win by KO: 20
- Losses: 27
- Draws: 17
- No contests: 1

External image
- Undated photo of Arizmendi (left) sparring on a rooftop, taken by Harry E. Winkler (glass plate negative held by the University of Notre Dame library)

Alberto "Baby" Arizmendi (March 17, 1914 – December 31, 1962) was a Mexican professional boxer and New York State Athletic Commission (NYSAC) featherweight world title holder in 1934. He also competed in the bantamweight and welterweight divisions.

== Early life and career ==
Arizmendi was born on March 17, 1913, in Torreón, Mexico. He took up boxing as early as seven or eight by some accounts to counter the effects of Polio which he had suffered from as a young child.

Baby used a charging, bruising style, making him a very strong two-fisted fighter. He began boxing professionally at age 13. He took his first championship, the Mexican bantamweight title at only eighteen, a twelve round points decision against Kid Poncho in Mexico City. With a victory over flyweight champion Fidel LaBarba, Baby established himself as a worthy contender for the featherweight crown.

On September 16, 1932, at the age of 19, he defeated reigning NBA world featherweight champion Tommy Paul in a close ten round non-title fight, dropping him in the second and fourth rounds. After his win, Arizmendi requested the National Boxing Association (NBA) recognize his status as champion. In support of his claim to the NBA title, the California boxing commission gave him the opportunity to fight for their version of the world title.

=== Taking and defending the California world featherweight title, October, 1932 ===
The following month, Arizmendi defeated Newsboy Brown to claim the California world featherweight title on October 18, 1932. The Associated Press wrote that Brown won only one round and was on the verge of being knocked out several times before the Los Angeles crowd of 7,000. Arizmendi nearly toppled Brown with a left hook in the third, but slowed his pace some in the fourth through seventh when Brown countered with short lefts, and rights to the body.

He retained his title with a draw against Varias Milling, then defended it against seasoned contenders Archie Bell and Speedy Dado. He first defeated Bell in ten round points decision at Legion Stadium in Hollywood on December 2, 1932. The California sanctioned title match before a capacity crowd saw Arizmendi close strongly in the last two rounds to take a convincing lead on points. Arizmendi was awarded six rounds, Bell two including the eighth when he landed some solid punches, and two were even. Bell was down for a no count in the second, and was dropped to his knees in the fourth.

In his January 6, 1933, California sanctioned World featherweight title rematch with Bell in San Francisco, Arizmendi won in a ten round points decision. Arizmendi opened up in the sixth, and rained a steady blow of punches in the remaining rounds to take a clear points margin. Bell may have held an edge in the first five rounds, with the exception of the third. He withstood the blows of Arizmendi in the final rounds and remained on his feet throughout.

In his last successful defense of the California-sanctioned world featherweight champion, Arizmendi defeated Speedy Dado in a ten round points decision in Los Angeles on January 24, 1933.

==== Losing the California sanctioned world featherweight title, February, 1933 ====
He lost the California version of the title to NBA World featherweight champion Freddie Miller on February 28, 1933, in a 10-round unification bout in Los Angeles. Miller took seven rounds, with one even, and two to Arizmendi. With a lightning right jab that landed repeatedly and a good left hook, Miller kept the Mexican champion at bay. Arizmendi performed best in the seventh where he rushed Miller to the ropes and bloodied his nose with hard rights to head and chin. The packed house containing many former Mexican fans, turned against Arizmendi, booing him and throwing bottles into the ring at the close of the match.

Arizmendi persevered, and later that year defeated Miller in a non-title fight.

=== Taking the NYSAC world featherweight crown, August, 1934 ===
On August 30, 1934, he defeated Mike Belloise for the New York state (NYSAC) world featherweight crown, leaving no doubt as to his claim to the championship. After the win, Arizmendi attempted to secure a third fight with NBA champion Miller in a title bout, however, Miller refused to face him. Arizmendi's failure to take the NBA version of the featherweight title affected his legacy, despite his taking both the New York State Athletic Commission (NYSAC), and Mexico-California version of the world featherweight titles in his career.

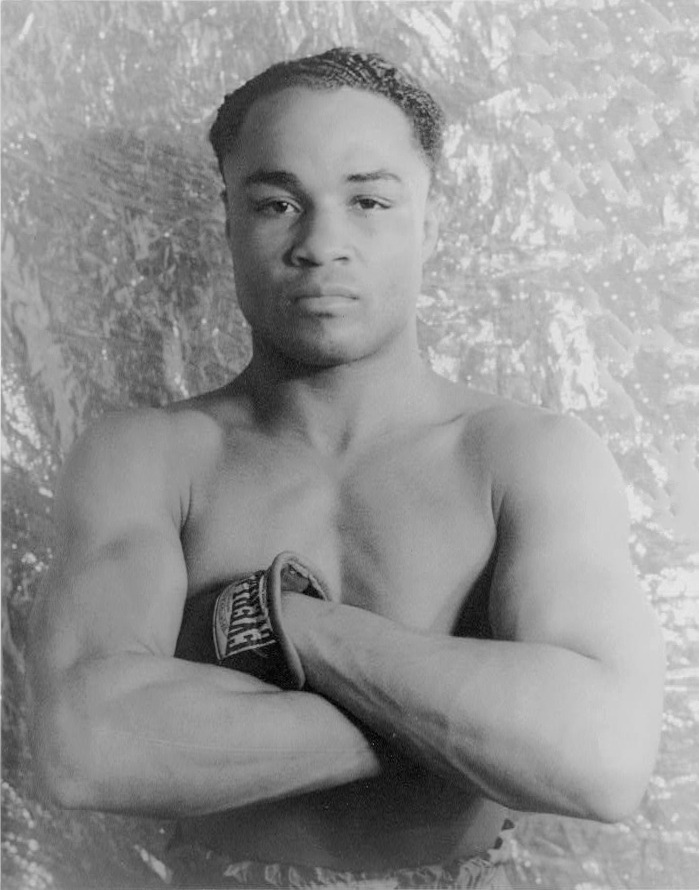
Armstrong

In Mexico City on November 4, 1934, he defeated Henry Armstrong in their first of five meetings, winning almost every round despite suffering a broken wrist in the second, and by some accounts taking claim of the California-Mexican World featherweight title. He defeated Armstrong once again on January 1, 1935, in a twelve round unanimous decision in Mexico City. Following those victories, he defeated future world title holder Chalky Wright by fourth round knockout. On February 7, 1936, he lost to future lightweight champion Lou Ambers in a ten round unanimous decision, with Ambers taking every round, by one account. Arizmendi, however fought well for the first five rounds, but was unable to continue the pace in the remaining portion of the match. Ambers got his range with his punishing left in the fourth, fifth, and sixth. In the eighth, Arizmendi suffered a bleeding cut near his right eye, helping Ambers to increase his points margin in the final two rounds. The bout was not billed as a title fight.

==== Losing the California-Mexico sanctioned featherweight title, August, 1936 ====
Arizmendi subsequently lost the California-Mexico World title in his third bout with Armstrong on August 4, 1936, at Wrigley Field in Los Angeles. In his following 7 fights, Arizmendi combined wins and losses before facing Armstrong for a fourth and final time on March 15, 1938, in Los Angele. In his following 6 fights, Arizmendi won five and had a ten round draw against reigning world lightweight champion Lou Ambers on June 7, 1938, in Los Angeles.

=== Attempt at the world welterweight crown, January 1939 ===
In his last bout with Armstrong and his last attempt at a world title, he dropped a grueling 10-round points decision before 10,500 fans for the world welterweight championship on January 10, 1939, at Los Angeles' Olympic Stadium. The match was ten rounds of continuous and largely close in fighting, and though admitting he put up a valiant effort, the Los Angeles Times could only award the fourth round to the badly bruised and bleeding Arizmendi. Armstrong characteristically crowded and threw continuous blows which included some fouls, but typical of his style, demonstrated neither elegant technique, nor graceful ring craft. He continued boxing until 1942, obtaining bouts with boxing standouts Lou Ambers, Sammy Angott, and George Latka, but never again went for a title.

Arizmendi faced Lou Ambers on February 24, 1939, losing in an eleventh round technical knockout in Madison Square Garden before a disappointing crowd of 8,837. A physician examining Arizmendi's eyes believed the gashes he had received during the bout were too serious to allow him to continue the bout. Arizmendi had completed all his previous bouts. Ambers, hoping to obtain another shot at the title, had fought viciously through the bout. He had drawn with Ambers on June 7, 1938, at Olympic Auditorium in Los Angeles, California. In one of his best performances against a reigning champion, one reporter gave four rounds to Ambers, as many as four to Arizmendi, and three even. Overcoming a 1-3 odds deficit, Arizmendi may have nearly dropped Ambers in the second with a right cross.

After retiring from boxing, Arizmendi served in the U.S. Navy during World War II, and later operated restaurants in the Echo Park District of Los Angeles. He was hospitalized in July, 1956, following a partial paralytic condition on his left side. According to his wife, Henrietta, he had been in poor health and lost fifty pounds the previous month.

== Death ==
After a prolonged illness, Arizmendi died of natural causes in the Veterans Administration Hospital in Sawtelle, California, now part of the Los Angeles suburb Westwood, on New Year's Eve 1962, at the age of 48. He was survived by his wife Henrietta and an illegitimate son Raul Robert Arizmendi, born February, 1933 in Los Angeles. Arizmendi was inducted into the International Boxing Hall of Fame in 2004.

== Professional boxing record ==
All information in this section is derived from BoxRec, unless otherwise stated.

=== Official Record ===
| 138 fights | 87 wins | 26 losses |
|---|---|---|
| By knockout | 20 | 4 |
| By decision | 67 | 22 |
| Draws | 14 | |
| No contests | 1 | |
| Newspaper decisions/draws | 10 | |

All newspaper decisions are officially regarded as “no decision” bouts and are not counted to the win/loss/draw column.

| No. | Result | Record | Opponent | Type | Round | Date | Age | Location | Notes |
|---|---|---|---|---|---|---|---|---|---|
| 138 | Loss | 87–26–14 (11) | Roman Alvarez | UD | 10 | Aug 21, 1942 | 28 years, 157 days | Legion Stadium, Hollywood, California, U.S. | |
| 137 | Loss | 87–25–14 (11) | Jimmy Garrison | TKO | 6 (10) | May 27, 1942 | 28 years, 71 days | Auditorium, Oakland, California, U.S. | |
| 136 | Loss | 87–24–14 (11) | Jimmy Garrison | UD | 10 | Apr 10, 1942 | 28 years, 24 days | Legion Stadium, Hollywood, California, U.S. | |
| 135 | Loss | 87–23–14 (11) | Jimmy Garrison | UD | 10 | Feb 27, 1942 | 27 years, 347 days | Legion Stadium, Hollywood, California, U.S. | |
| 134 | Win | 87–22–14 (11) | Quentin Breese | UD | 10 | Nov 21, 1941 | 27 years, 249 days | Legion Stadium, Hollywood, California, U.S. | |
| 133 | Win | 86–22–14 (11) | Johnny Hutchinson | PTS | 10 | Aug 22, 1941 | 27 years, 158 days | Legion Stadium, Hollywood, California, U.S. | |
| 132 | Loss | 85–22–14 (11) | California Jackie Wilson | TKO | 8 (10) | May 19, 1941 | 27 years, 63 days | Wrigley Field, Los Angeles, California, U.S. | For USA California State welterweight title |
| 131 | Loss | 85–21–14 (11) | Red Green | PTS | 10 | Mar 7, 1941 | 26 years, 355 days | Legion Stadium, Hollywood, California, U.S. | |
| 130 | Win | 85–20–14 (11) | Toby Vigil | PTS | 10 | Jan 24, 1941 | 26 years, 313 days | Legion Stadium, Hollywood, California, U.S. | |
| 129 | Win | 84–20–14 (11) | George Latka | PTS | 10 | Dec 6, 1940 | 26 years, 264 days | Legion Stadium, Hollywood, California, U.S. | |
| 128 | Win | 83–20–14 (11) | Richard Polite | KO | 2 (10) | Nov 8, 1940 | 26 years, 236 days | Legion Stadium, Hollywood, California, U.S. | |
| 127 | Draw | 82–20–14 (11) | Jackie Callura | PTS | 10 | Sep 25, 1940 | 26 years, 192 days | Auditorium, Oakland, California, U.S. | |
| 126 | Loss | 82–20–13 (11) | Chief Evening Thunder | PTS | 10 | Sep 4, 1940 | 26 years, 171 days | Wilmington Bowl, Wilmington, California, U.S. | |
| 125 | Win | 82–19–13 (11) | Dub Bowen | KO | 4 (10) | Aug 14, 1940 | 26 years, 150 days | Wilmington Bowl, Wilmington, California, U.S. | |
| 124 | Draw | 81–19–13 (11) | Sammy Angott | PTS | 10 | Jun 25, 1940 | 26 years, 100 days | Olympic Auditorium, Los Angeles, California, U.S. | |
| 123 | Win | 81–19–12 (11) | Guy Serean | PTS | 10 | Jun 11, 1940 | 26 years, 86 days | Olympic Auditorium, Los Angeles, California, U.S. | |
| 122 | Loss | 80–19–12 (11) | George Latka | PTS | 10 | Apr 2, 1940 | 26 years, 16 days | Olympic Auditorium, Los Angeles, California, U.S. | |
| 121 | Loss | 80–18–12 (11) | Sammy Angott | UD | 10 | Nov 3, 1939 | 25 years, 231 days | Chicago Stadium, Chicago, Illinois, U.S. | |
| 120 | Win | 80–17–12 (11) | Joey Silva | KO | 1 (10) | Sep 12, 1939 | 25 years, 179 days | Olympic Auditorium, Los Angeles, California, U.S. | |
| 119 | Win | 79–17–12 (11) | Jackie Carter | KO | 1 (10) | Aug 22, 1939 | 25 years, 158 days | Olympic Auditorium, Los Angeles, California, U.S. | |
| 118 | Draw | 78–17–12 (11) | Eddie Marcus | PTS | 8 | May 16, 1939 | 25 years, 60 days | Olympic Auditorium, Los Angeles, California, U.S. | |
| 117 | Loss | 78–17–11 (11) | Lou Ambers | TKO | 11 (12) | Feb 24, 1939 | 24 years, 344 days | Madison Square Garden, Manhattan, New York City, New York, U.S. | |
| 116 | Loss | 78–16–11 (11) | Henry Armstrong | PTS | 10 | Jan 10, 1939 | 24 years, 299 days | Olympic Auditorium, Los Angeles, California, U.S. | For NYSAC, NBA, and The Ring welterweight titles |
| 115 | Win | 78–15–11 (11) | Wally Hally | PTS | 10 | Oct 10, 1938 | 24 years, 207 days | Municipal Auditorium, New Orleans, Louisiana, U.S. | |
| 114 | Win | 77–15–11 (11) | Umio Gen | PTS | 10 | Sep 23, 1938 | 24 years, 190 days | Coliseum, San Diego, California, U.S. | |
| 113 | Win | 76–15–11 (11) | Wally Hally | PTS | 10 | Sep 9, 1938 | 24 years, 176 days | Coliseum, San Diego, California, U.S. | |
| 112 | Win | 75–15–11 (11) | Jimmy Vaughn | PTS | 10 | Jul 26, 1938 | 24 years, 131 days | Olympic Auditorium, Los Angeles, California, U.S. | |
| 111 | Draw | 74–15–11 (11) | Lou Ambers | PTS | 10 | Jun 7, 1938 | 24 years, 82 days | Olympic Auditorium, Los Angeles, California, U.S. | |
| 110 | Win | 74–15–10 (11) | Wally Hally | PTS | 10 | May 17, 1938 | 24 years, 61 days | Olympic Auditorium, Los Angeles, California, U.S. | |
| 109 | Loss | 73–15–10 (11) | Henry Armstrong | UD | 10 | Mar 15, 1938 | 23 years, 363 days | Olympic Auditorium, Los Angeles, California, U.S. | |
| 108 | Win | 73–14–10 (11) | Bus Breese | PTS | 10 | Nov 16, 1937 | 23 years, 244 days | Olympic Auditorium, Los Angeles, California, U.S. | |
| 107 | Win | 72–14–10 (11) | Chalky Wright | PTS | 10 | Oct 5, 1937 | 23 years, 202 days | Olympic Auditorium, Los Angeles, California, U.S. | |
| 106 | Win | 71–14–10 (11) | Richie Fontaine | PTS | 10 | Aug 31, 1937 | 23 years, 167 days | Olympic Auditorium, Los Angeles, California, U.S. | |
| 105 | Loss | 70–14–10 (11) | Wally Hally | PTS | 10 | Mar 23, 1937 | 23 years, 6 days | Olympic Auditorium, Los Angeles, California, U.S. | |
| 104 | Loss | 70–13–10 (11) | Jimmy Vaughn | PTS | 10 | Mar 12, 1937 | 22 years, 360 days | Legion Stadium, Hollywood, California, U.S. | |
| 103 | Draw | 70–12–10 (11) | Frankie Wallace | PTS | 10 | Nov 10, 1936 | 22 years, 238 days | Olympic Auditorium, Los Angeles, California, U.S. | |
| 102 | Draw | 70–12–9 (11) | Frankie Covelli | PTS | 10 | Sep 18, 1936 | 22 years, 185 days | Legion Stadium, Hollywood, California, U.S. | |
| 101 | Loss | 70–12–8 (11) | Henry Armstrong | PTS | 10 | Aug 4, 1936 | 22 years, 140 days | Wrigley Field, Los Angeles, California, U.S. | Lost California-Mexico featherweight titles |
| 100 | Win | 70–11–8 (11) | Wally Hally | PTS | 10 | Jun 16, 1936 | 22 years, 91 days | Olympic Auditorium, Los Angeles, California, U.S. | |
| 99 | Draw | 69–11–8 (11) | Frankie Covelli | TD | 9 (10) | May 29, 1936 | 22 years, 73 days | Legion Stadium, Hollywood, California, U.S. | |
| 98 | Win | 69–11–7 (11) | Pablo Dano | PTS | 10 | May 5, 1936 | 22 years, 49 days | Olympic Auditorium, Los Angeles, California, U.S. | |
| 97 | Win | 68–11–7 (11) | Tiger Kid Walker | PTS | 10 | Apr 1, 1936 | 22 years, 15 days | Music Hall Arena, Cincinnati, Ohio, U.S. | |
| 96 | Draw | 67–11–7 (11) | Phil Baker | PTS | 10 | Mar 16, 1936 | 21 years, 365 days | St. Nicholas Arena, Manhattan, New York City, New York, U.S. | |
| 95 | Loss | 67–11–6 (11) | Lou Ambers | UD | 10 | Feb 7, 1936 | 21 years, 337 days | Madison Square Garden, Manhattan, New York City, New York, U.S. | |
| 94 | Win | 67–10–6 (11) | Jackie Sharkey | TKO | 6 (10) | Dec 16, 1935 | 21 years, 274 days | Public Hall, Cleveland, Ohio, U.S. | |
| 93 | Win | 66–10–6 (11) | Davey Day | MD | 10 | Nov 8, 1935 | 21 years, 236 days | Chicago Stadium, Chicago, Illinois, U.S. | |
| 92 | Win | 65–10–6 (11) | Jimmy Christy | SD | 10 | Oct 4, 1935 | 21 years, 201 days | Chicago Stadium, Chicago, Illinois, U.S. | |
| 91 | Win | 64–10–6 (11) | Mickey Genaro | PTS | 10 | Sep 9, 1935 | 21 years, 176 days | Quincy, Illinois, U.S. | |
| 90 | Loss | 63–10–6 (11) | Fillo Echevarria | PTS | 10 | Jul 6, 1935 | 21 years, 111 days | Havana, Cuba | |
| 89 | Loss | 63–9–6 (11) | Rodolfo Casanova | PTS | 12 | Jun 8, 1935 | 21 years, 83 days | Arena Nacional, Mexico City, Distrito Federal, Mexico | |
| 88 | Win | 63–8–6 (11) | Frankie Wallace | TKO | 6 (10) | Mar 31, 1935 | 21 years, 14 days | El Toreo de Cuatro Caminos, Mexico City, Distrito Federal, Mexico | |
| 87 | Win | 62–8–6 (11) | Timoteo Elizalde | PTS | 10 | Feb 24, 1935 | 20 years, 344 days | Puebla, Puebla, Mexico | |
| 86 | Win | 61–8–6 (11) | Chalky Wright | KO | 4 (10) | Feb 2, 1935 | 20 years, 322 days | Arena Nacional, Mexico City, Distrito Federal, Mexico | |
| 85 | Win | 60–8–6 (11) | Henry Armstrong | UD | 12 | Jan 1, 1935 | 20 years, 290 days | El Toreo de Cuatro Caminos, Mexico City, Distrito Federal, Mexico | |
| 84 | Win | 59–8–6 (11) | Henry Armstrong | PTS | 10 | Nov 4, 1934 | 20 years, 232 days | Arena Nacional, Mexico City, Distrito Federal, Mexico | |
| 83 | Win | 58–8–6 (11) | Mike Belloise | UD | 15 | Aug 30, 1934 | 20 years, 166 days | Dyckman Oval, Manhattan, New York City, New York, U.S. | Won vacant NYSAC featherweight title |
| 82 | Win | 57–8–6 (11) | Al Roth | PTS | 10 | May 11, 1934 | 20 years, 55 days | Madison Square Garden, Manhattan, New York City, New York, U.S. | |
| 81 | Loss | 56–8–6 (11) | Tony Canzoneri | PTS | 10 | Mar 13, 1934 | 19 years, 361 days | Olympic Auditorium, Los Angeles, California, U.S. | |
| 80 | Win | 56–7–6 (11) | Al Greenfield | KO | 3 (10) | Feb 23, 1934 | 19 years, 343 days | Liberty Hall, El Paso, Texas, U.S. | |
| 79 | Win | 55–7–6 (11) | Mark Diaz | TKO | 9 (10) | Feb 9, 1934 | 19 years, 329 days | Pismo Beach Arena, Pismo Beach, California, U.S. | |
| 78 | Win | 54–7–6 (11) | Mark Diaz | PTS | 10 | Jan 23, 1934 | 19 years, 312 days | Olympic Auditorium, Los Angeles, California, U.S. | |
| 77 | Win | 53–7–6 (11) | Eddie Shea | PTS | 10 | Nov 28, 1933 | 19 years, 256 days | Olympic Auditorium, Los Angeles, California, U.S. | |
| 76 | Win | 52–7–6 (11) | Eddie Shea | PTS | 10 | Nov 7, 1933 | 19 years, 235 days | Olympic Auditorium, Los Angeles, California, U.S. | |
| 75 | Win | 51–7–6 (11) | Cris Pineda | PTS | 10 | Sep 8, 1933 | 19 years, 175 days | Legion Stadium, Hollywood, California, U.S. | |
| 74 | Win | 50–7–6 (11) | Baby Palmore | PTS | 10 | Jul 21, 1933 | 19 years, 126 days | Legion Stadium, Hollywood, California, U.S. | |
| 73 | Loss | 49–7–6 (11) | Clever Sison | PTS | 10 | Jul 4, 1933 | 19 years, 109 days | Memorial Auditorium, Sacramento, California, U.S. | |
| 72 | Win | 49–6–6 (11) | Freddie Miller | PTS | 10 | Jun 12, 1933 | 19 years, 87 days | Exposition Auditorium, San Francisco, California, U.S. | |
| 71 | Win | 48–6–6 (11) | Mickey Cohen | KO | 3 (10) | May 14, 1933 | 19 years, 58 days | Foreign Club Arena, Tijuana, Baja California, Mexico | |
| 70 | Win | 47–6–6 (11) | Al Greenfield | KO | 4 (10) | Apr 30, 1933 | 19 years, 44 days | Foreign Club Arena, Tijuana, Baja California, Mexico | |
| 69 | Win | 46–6–6 (11) | Kid Charol II | PTS | 10 | Mar 28, 1933 | 19 years, 11 days | Olympic Auditorium, Los Angeles, California, U.S. | |
| 68 | Loss | 45–6–6 (11) | Young Tommy | PTS | 10 | Mar 15, 1933 | 18 years, 363 days | Civic Auditorium, San Francisco, California, U.S. | |
| 67 | Loss | 45–5–6 (11) | Freddie Miller | PTS | 10 | Feb 28, 1933 | 18 years, 348 days | Olympic Auditorium, Los Angeles, California, U.S. | Lost world featherweight title (California version); For NBA featherweight title |
| 66 | Win | 45–4–6 (11) | Speedy Dado | PTS | 10 | Jan 24, 1933 | 18 years, 313 days | Olympic Auditorium, Los Angeles, California, U.S. | Retained world featherweight title (California version) |
| 65 | Win | 44–4–6 (11) | Archie Bell | PTS | 10 | Jan 6, 1933 | 18 years, 295 days | Dreamland Auditorium, San Francisco, California, U.S. | Retained world featherweight title (California version) |
| 64 | Win | 43–4–6 (11) | Rodolfo Teglia | RTD | 3 (10) | Dec 16, 1932 | 18 years, 274 days | Madison Square Garden, Phoenix, Arizona, U.S. | |
| 63 | Win | 42–4–6 (11) | Archie Bell | PTS | 10 | Dec 2, 1932 | 18 years, 260 days | Legion Stadium, Hollywood, California, U.S. | Retained world featherweight title (California version) |
| 62 | Draw | 41–4–6 (11) | Varias Milling | PTS | 10 | Nov 22, 1932 | 18 years, 250 days | Olympic Auditorium, Los Angeles, California, U.S. | Retained world featherweight title (California version) |
| 61 | Win | 41–4–5 (11) | Newsboy Brown | PTS | 10 | Oct 18, 1932 | 18 years, 215 days | Olympic Auditorium, Los Angeles, California, U.S. | Won vacant world featherweight title (California version) |
| 60 | Win | 40–4–5 (11) | Tommy Paul | PTS | 10 | Sep 16, 1932 | 18 years, 183 days | El Toreo de Cuatro Caminos, Mexico City, Distrito Federal, Mexico | |
| 59 | Loss | 39–4–5 (11) | Newsboy Brown | PTS | 10 | Jun 28, 1932 | 18 years, 103 days | Olympic Auditorium, Los Angeles, California, U.S. | |
| 58 | Win | 39–3–5 (11) | Newsboy Brown | PTS | 10 | Jun 7, 1932 | 18 years, 82 days | Olympic Auditorium, Los Angeles, California, U.S. | |
| 57 | Win | 38–3–5 (11) | Lew Farber | PTS | 10 | May 3, 1932 | 18 years, 47 days | Olympic Auditorium, Los Angeles, California, U.S. | |
| 56 | Win | 37–3–5 (11) | Young Tommy | PTS | 10 | Apr 19, 1932 | 18 years, 33 days | Olympic Auditorium, Los Angeles, California, U.S. | |
| 55 | Loss | 36–3–5 (11) | Speedy Dado | PTS | 10 | Mar 18, 1932 | 18 years, 1 day | Stockton, Los Angeles, California, U.S. | |
| 54 | Win | 36–2–5 (11) | Claude Varner | PTS | 10 | Mar 1, 1932 | 17 years, 350 days | Olympic Auditorium, Los Angeles, California, U.S. | |
| 53 | Win | 35–2–5 (11) | Speedy Dado | PTS | 10 | Feb 9, 1932 | 17 years, 329 days | Olympic Auditorium, Los Angeles, California, U.S. | |
| 52 | Win | 34–2–5 (11) | Fidel LaBarba | PTS | 10 | Jan 1, 1932 | 17 years, 290 days | El Toreo de Cuatro Caminos, Mexico City, Distrito Federal, Mexico | |
| 51 | Win | 33–2–5 (11) | Eddie Cerda | PTS | 10 | Dec 12, 1931 | 17 years, 270 days | Arena Nacional, Mexico City, Distrito Federal, Mexico | |
| 50 | Win | 32–2–5 (11) | Kid Pancho | PTS | 12 | Nov 14, 1931 | 17 years, 242 days | Arena Nacional, Mexico City, Distrito Federal, Mexico | Won Mexico bantamweight title |
| 49 | Win | 31–2–5 (11) | Marcial Zavala | PTS | 10 | Oct 17, 1931 | 17 years, 214 days | Mexico City, Distrito Federal, Mexico | |
| 48 | Win | 30–2–5 (11) | Jorge Rendon | PTS | 10 | Oct 3, 1931 | 17 years, 200 days | Arena Nacional, Mexico City, Distrito Federal, Mexico | |
| 47 | Win | 29–2–5 (11) | Rodolfo Teglia | PTS | 10 | Sep 26, 1931 | 17 years, 193 days | Mexico City, Distrito Federal, Mexico | |
| 46 | Win | 28–2–5 (11) | Blas Rodriguez | PTS | 10 | Aug 16, 1931 | 17 years, 152 days | Plaza de Toros, Torreon, Coahuila de Zaragoza, Mexico | |
| 45 | Win | 27–2–5 (11) | Pablo Alejandro | PTS | 10 | Jul 26, 1931 | 17 years, 131 days | Plaza de Toros, Torreon, Coahuila de Zaragoza, Mexico | |
| 44 | Win | 26–2–5 (11) | Rodolfo Teglia | TKO | 5 (10) | Jul 11, 1931 | 17 years, 116 days | Tampico, Tamaulipas, Mexico | |
| 43 | Win | 25–2–5 (11) | Battling Shaw | PTS | 10 | Feb 28, 1931 | 16 years, 348 days | Laredo, Texas, U.S. | |
| 42 | Draw | 24–2–5 (11) | Babe Colima | PTS | 10 | Jan 17, 1931 | 16 years, 306 days | Tampico, Tamaulipas, Mexico | |
| 41 | Draw | 24–2–4 (11) | Babe Colima | PTS | 10 | Jan 3, 1931 | 16 years, 292 days | Tampico, Tamaulipas, Mexico | |
| 40 | Win | 24–2–3 (11) | Leonardo de la Cruz | KO | 6 (10) | Nov 1, 1930 | 16 years, 229 days | Arena Mexico, Tampico, Tamaulipas, Mexico | |
| 39 | Win | 23–2–3 (11) | Kid Gorilla | PTS | 10 | Oct 11, 1930 | 16 years, 208 days | Arena Mexico, Tampico, Tamaulipas, Mexico | |
| 38 | Win | 22–2–3 (11) | Julian Villegas | PTS | 10 | Oct 4, 1930 | 16 years, 201 days | Arena Mexico, Tampico, Tamaulipas, Mexico | |
| 37 | Draw | 21–2–3 (11) | Claude Varner | PTS | 10 | Oct 1, 1930 | 16 years, 198 days | Mexico City, Distrito Federal, Mexico | Precise date unknown at this time |
| 36 | Loss | 21–2–2 (11) | Chato Laredo | PTS | 10 | May 1, 1930 | 16 years, 45 days | Arena Nacional, Mexico City, Distrito Federal, Mexico | Precise date unknown at this time |
| 35 | Win | 21–1–2 (11) | Vicente Torres | PTS | 10 | Feb 22, 1930 | 15 years, 342 days | Mexico City, Distrito Federal, Mexico | |
| 34 | Win | 20–1–2 (11) | Julian Villegas | PTS | 10 | Jan 1, 1930 | 15 years, 290 days | El Toreo de Cuatro Caminos, Mexico City, Distrito Federal, Mexico | |
| 33 | Win | 19–1–2 (11) | Leonardo de la Cruz | PTS | 10 | May 26, 1929 | 15 years, 70 days | Mexico City, Distrito Federal, Mexico | |
| 32 | Win | 18–1–2 (11) | Julian Villegas | PTS | 10 | May 4, 1929 | 15 years, 48 days | Arena Nacional, Mexico City, Distrito Federal, Mexico | |
| 31 | Win | 17–1–2 (11) | Henry Moreno | NWS | 4 | Oct 30, 1928 | 14 years, 227 days | San Antonio, Texas, U.S. | |
| 30 | Win | 17–1–2 (10) | Pedro Ortega | PTS | 6 | Oct 22, 1928 | 14 years, 219 days | City Auditorium, Galveston, Texas, U.S. | |
| 29 | Win | 16–1–2 (10) | Skeets Baker | TKO | 2 (4) | Oct 1, 1928 | 14 years, 198 days | City Auditorium, Galveston, Texas, U.S. | |
| 28 | Draw | 15–1–2 (10) | Kid Adams | NWS | 6 | Sep 25, 1928 | 14 years, 192 days | Jack Shelton Arena, San Antonio, Texas, U.S. | |
| 27 | Win | 15–1–2 (9) | Billy Cain | PTS | 6 | Aug 21, 1928 | 14 years, 157 days | Soledad Roof, San Antonio, Texas, U.S. | |
| 26 | Draw | 14–1–2 (9) | Howard Carr | PTS | 6 | Aug 15, 1928 | 14 years, 151 days | School Park Arena, Galveston, Texas, U.S. | |
| 25 | Win | 14–1–1 (9) | Skeets Baker | PTS | 6 | Jul 30, 1928 | 14 years, 135 days | Kennel Association Track, Galveston, Texas, U.S. | |
| 24 | NC | 13–1–1 (9) | Joe Montana | NC | 6 (8) | Jul 24, 1928 | 14 years, 129 days | Soledad Roof, San Antonio, Texas, U.S. | Declared NC because of lack of action. At the fans' insistence the fighters finished the remaining two rounds |
| 23 | Win | 13–1–1 (8) | Al Bosque | NWS | 4 | Jul 10, 1928 | 14 years, 115 days | Soledad Roof, San Antonio, Texas, U.S. | |
| 22 | Win | 13–1–1 (7) | Kid Adams | PTS | 8 | Jul 2, 1928 | 14 years, 107 days | Soledad Roof, San Antonio, Texas, U.S. | |
| 21 | Loss | 12–1–1 (7) | Diego Acuna | RTD | 6 (10) | Jun 25, 1928 | 14 years, 100 days | Soledad Roof, San Antonio, Texas, U.S. | |
| 20 | Win | 12–0–1 (7) | Black Panther | PTS | 6 | Jun 13, 1928 | 14 years, 88 days | Mercedes, Texas, U.S. | |
| 19 | Win | 11–0–1 (7) | Kid Zizo | PTS | 8 | May 31, 1928 | 14 years, 75 days | Fort McIntosh Bowl, Laredo, Texas, U.S. | |
| 18 | Win | 10–0–1 (7) | Kid Adams | NWS | 8 | May 22, 1928 | 14 years, 66 days | Business Men's A.C., San Antonio, Texas, U.S. | |
| 17 | Win | 10–0–1 (6) | Johnny Pyle | PTS | 6 | May 10, 1928 | 14 years, 54 days | Fort Sam Houston, San Antonio, Texas, U.S. | |
| 16 | Win | 9–0–1 (6) | Kid Luna | PTS | 8 | Apr 19, 1928 | 14 years, 33 days | Fort McIntosh Bowl, Laredo, Texas, U.S. | |
| 15 | Draw | 8–0–1 (6) | Kid Adams | NWS | 6 | Apr 10, 1928 | 14 years, 24 days | Business Men's A.C., San Antonio, Texas, U.S. | |
| 14 | Win | 8–0–1 (5) | Newsboy Reyes | NWS | 6 | Mar 27, 1928 | 14 years, 10 days | Business Men's A.C., San Antonio, Texas, U.S. | |
| 13 | Loss | 8–0–1 (4) | Kid Adams | NWS | 6 | Mar 20, 1928 | 14 years, 3 days | Business Men's A.C., San Antonio, Texas, U.S. | |
| 12 | Win | 8–0–1 (3) | Hill Hernandez | NWS | 6 | Mar 13, 1928 | 13 years, 355 days | Business Men's A.C., San Antonio, Texas, U.S. | |
| 11 | Win | 8–0–1 (2) | Battling Herrera | TKO | 5 (6) | Mar 6, 1928 | 13 years, 355 days | Business Men's A.C., San Antonio, Texas, U.S. | |
| 10 | Win | 7–0–1 (2) | Tony Feraci | NWS | 10 | Feb 14, 1928 | 13 years, 334 days | Business Men's A.C., San Antonio, Texas, U.S. | |
| 9 | Win | 7–0–1 (1) | Black Panther | PTS | 6 | Dec 30, 1927 | 13 years, 288 days | Fort McIntosh Theatre, Laredo, Texas, U.S. | |
| 8 | Draw | 6–0–1 (1) | Hill Hernandez | PTS | 6 | Nov 18, 1927 | 13 years, 246 days | Fort McIntosh Bowl, Laredo, Texas, U.S. | |
| 7 | Win | 6–0 (1) | Kid Zizo | TKO | 2 (6) | Nov 11, 1927 | 13 years, 239 days | Fort McIntosh Bowl, Laredo, Texas, U.S. | |
| 6 | Draw | 5–0 (1) | Chato Laredo | NWS | 10 | Oct 11, 1927 | 13 years, 208 days | Soledad Roof, San Antonio, Texas, U.S. | |
| 5 | Win | 5–0 | Baby Lincoln | KO | 1 (6) | Oct 6, 1927 | 13 years, 203 days | Fort McIntosh Bowl, Laredo, Texas, U.S. | |
| 4 | Win | 4–0 | Black Panther | PTS | 6 | Sep 22, 1927 | 13 years, 189 days | Fort McIntosh Bowl, Laredo, Texas, U.S. | |
| 3 | Win | 3–0 | Henry Moreno | PTS | 6 | Sep 8, 1927 | 13 years, 175 days | Fort McIntosh Bowl, Laredo, Texas, U.S. | |
| 2 | Win | 2–0 | Kid Zizo | KO | 6 (6) | Sep 1, 1927 | 13 years, 168 days | Fort McIntosh Bowl, Laredo, Texas, U.S. | |
| 1 | Win | 1–0 | Ray Ortiz | KO | 1 (6) | Aug 25, 1927 | 13 years, 161 days | Fort McIntosh Bowl, Laredo, Texas, U.S. | |

=== Unofficial record ===
| 138 fights | 93 wins | 27 losses |
|---|---|---|
| By knockout | 20 | 4 |
| By decision | 73 | 23 |
| Draws | 17 | |
| No contests | 1 | |

Record with the inclusion of newspaper decisions to the win/loss/draw column.

| No. | Result | Record | Opponent | Type | Round | Date | Age | Location | Notes |
|---|---|---|---|---|---|---|---|---|---|
| 138 | Loss | 93–27–17 (1) | Roman Alvarez | UD | 10 | Aug 21, 1942 | 28 years, 157 days | Legion Stadium, Hollywood, California, U.S. | |
| 137 | Loss | 93–26–17 (1) | Jimmy Garrison | TKO | 6 (10) | May 27, 1942 | 28 years, 71 days | Auditorium, Oakland, California, U.S. | |
| 136 | Loss | 93–25–17 (1) | Jimmy Garrison | UD | 10 | Apr 10, 1942 | 28 years, 24 days | Legion Stadium, Hollywood, California, U.S. | |
| 135 | Loss | 93–24–17 (1) | Jimmy Garrison | UD | 10 | Feb 27, 1942 | 27 years, 347 days | Legion Stadium, Hollywood, California, U.S. | |
| 134 | Win | 93–23–17 (1) | Quentin Breese | UD | 10 | Nov 21, 1941 | 27 years, 249 days | Legion Stadium, Hollywood, California, U.S. | |
| 133 | Win | 92–23–17 (1) | Johnny Hutchinson | PTS | 10 | Aug 22, 1941 | 27 years, 158 days | Legion Stadium, Hollywood, California, U.S. | |
| 132 | Loss | 91–23–17 (1) | California Jackie Wilson | TKO | 8 (10) | May 19, 1941 | 27 years, 63 days | Wrigley Field, Los Angeles, California, U.S. | For USA California State welterweight title |
| 131 | Loss | 91–22–17 (1) | Red Green | PTS | 10 | Mar 7, 1941 | 26 years, 355 days | Legion Stadium, Hollywood, California, U.S. | |
| 130 | Win | 91–21–17 (1) | Toby Vigil | PTS | 10 | Jan 24, 1941 | 26 years, 313 days | Legion Stadium, Hollywood, California, U.S. | |
| 129 | Win | 90–21–17 (1) | George Latka | PTS | 10 | Dec 6, 1940 | 26 years, 264 days | Legion Stadium, Hollywood, California, U.S. | |
| 128 | Win | 89–21–17 (1) | Richard Polite | KO | 2 (10) | Nov 8, 1940 | 26 years, 236 days | Legion Stadium, Hollywood, California, U.S. | |
| 127 | Draw | 88–21–17 (1) | Jackie Callura | PTS | 10 | Sep 25, 1940 | 26 years, 192 days | Auditorium, Oakland, California, U.S. | |
| 126 | Loss | 88–21–16 (1) | Chief Evening Thunder | PTS | 10 | Sep 4, 1940 | 26 years, 171 days | Wilmington Bowl, Wilmington, California, U.S. | |
| 125 | Win | 88–20–16 (1) | Dub Bowen | KO | 4 (10) | Aug 14, 1940 | 26 years, 150 days | Wilmington Bowl, Wilmington, California, U.S. | |
| 124 | Draw | 87–20–16 (1) | Sammy Angott | PTS | 10 | Jun 25, 1940 | 26 years, 100 days | Olympic Auditorium, Los Angeles, California, U.S. | |
| 123 | Win | 87–20–15 (1) | Guy Serean | PTS | 10 | Jun 11, 1940 | 26 years, 86 days | Olympic Auditorium, Los Angeles, California, U.S. | |
| 122 | Loss | 86–20–15 (1) | George Latka | PTS | 10 | Apr 2, 1940 | 26 years, 16 days | Olympic Auditorium, Los Angeles, California, U.S. | |
| 121 | Loss | 86–19–15 (1) | Sammy Angott | UD | 10 | Nov 3, 1939 | 25 years, 231 days | Chicago Stadium, Chicago, Illinois, U.S. | |
| 120 | Win | 86–18–15 (1) | Joey Silva | KO | 1 (10) | Sep 12, 1939 | 25 years, 179 days | Olympic Auditorium, Los Angeles, California, U.S. | |
| 119 | Win | 85–18–15 (1) | Jackie Carter | KO | 1 (10) | Aug 22, 1939 | 25 years, 158 days | Olympic Auditorium, Los Angeles, California, U.S. | |
| 118 | Draw | 84–18–15 (1) | Eddie Marcus | PTS | 8 | May 16, 1939 | 25 years, 60 days | Olympic Auditorium, Los Angeles, California, U.S. | |
| 117 | Loss | 84–18–14 (1) | Lou Ambers | TKO | 11 (12) | Feb 24, 1939 | 24 years, 344 days | Madison Square Garden, Manhattan, New York City, New York, U.S. | |
| 116 | Loss | 84–17–14 (1) | Henry Armstrong | PTS | 10 | Jan 10, 1939 | 24 years, 299 days | Olympic Auditorium, Los Angeles, California, U.S. | For NYSAC, NBA, and The Ring welterweight titles |
| 115 | Win | 84–16–14 (1) | Wally Hally | PTS | 10 | Oct 10, 1938 | 24 years, 207 days | Municipal Auditorium, New Orleans, Louisiana, U.S. | |
| 114 | Win | 83–16–14 (1) | Umio Gen | PTS | 10 | Sep 23, 1938 | 24 years, 190 days | Coliseum, San Diego, California, U.S. | |
| 113 | Win | 82–16–14 (1) | Wally Hally | PTS | 10 | Sep 9, 1938 | 24 years, 176 days | Coliseum, San Diego, California, U.S. | |
| 112 | Win | 81–16–14 (1) | Jimmy Vaughn | PTS | 10 | Jul 26, 1938 | 24 years, 131 days | Olympic Auditorium, Los Angeles, California, U.S. | |
| 111 | Draw | 80–16–14 (1) | Lou Ambers | PTS | 10 | Jun 7, 1938 | 24 years, 82 days | Olympic Auditorium, Los Angeles, California, U.S. | |
| 110 | Win | 80–16–13 (1) | Wally Hally | PTS | 10 | May 17, 1938 | 24 years, 61 days | Olympic Auditorium, Los Angeles, California, U.S. | |
| 109 | Loss | 79–16–13 (1) | Henry Armstrong | UD | 10 | Mar 15, 1938 | 23 years, 363 days | Olympic Auditorium, Los Angeles, California, U.S. | |
| 108 | Win | 79–15–13 (1) | Bus Breese | PTS | 10 | Nov 16, 1937 | 23 years, 244 days | Olympic Auditorium, Los Angeles, California, U.S. | |
| 107 | Win | 78–15–13 (1) | Chalky Wright | PTS | 10 | Oct 5, 1937 | 23 years, 202 days | Olympic Auditorium, Los Angeles, California, U.S. | |
| 106 | Win | 77–15–13 (1) | Richie Fontaine | PTS | 10 | Aug 31, 1937 | 23 years, 167 days | Olympic Auditorium, Los Angeles, California, U.S. | |
| 105 | Loss | 76–15–13 (1) | Wally Hally | PTS | 10 | Mar 23, 1937 | 23 years, 6 days | Olympic Auditorium, Los Angeles, California, U.S. | |
| 104 | Loss | 76–14–13 (1) | Jimmy Vaughn | PTS | 10 | Mar 12, 1937 | 22 years, 360 days | Legion Stadium, Hollywood, California, U.S. | |
| 103 | Draw | 76–13–13 (1) | Frankie Wallace | PTS | 10 | Nov 10, 1936 | 22 years, 238 days | Olympic Auditorium, Los Angeles, California, U.S. | |
| 102 | Draw | 76–13–12 (1) | Frankie Covelli | PTS | 10 | Sep 18, 1936 | 22 years, 185 days | Legion Stadium, Hollywood, California, U.S. | |
| 101 | Loss | 76–13–11 (1) | Henry Armstrong | PTS | 10 | Aug 4, 1936 | 22 years, 140 days | Wrigley Field, Los Angeles, California, U.S. | Lost California-Mexico featherweight titles |
| 100 | Win | 76–12–11 (1) | Wally Hally | PTS | 10 | Jun 16, 1936 | 22 years, 91 days | Olympic Auditorium, Los Angeles, California, U.S. | |
| 99 | Draw | 75–12–11 (1) | Frankie Covelli | TD | 9 (10) | May 29, 1936 | 22 years, 73 days | Legion Stadium, Hollywood, California, U.S. | |
| 98 | Win | 75–12–10 (1) | Pablo Dano | PTS | 10 | May 5, 1936 | 22 years, 49 days | Olympic Auditorium, Los Angeles, California, U.S. | |
| 97 | Win | 74–12–10 (1) | Tiger Kid Walker | PTS | 10 | Apr 1, 1936 | 22 years, 15 days | Music Hall Arena, Cincinnati, Ohio, U.S. | |
| 96 | Draw | 73–12–10 (1) | Phil Baker | PTS | 10 | Mar 16, 1936 | 21 years, 365 days | St. Nicholas Arena, Manhattan, New York City, New York, U.S. | |
| 95 | Loss | 73–12–9 (1) | Lou Ambers | UD | 10 | Feb 7, 1936 | 21 years, 337 days | Madison Square Garden, Manhattan, New York City, New York, U.S. | |
| 94 | Win | 73–11–9 (1) | Jackie Sharkey | TKO | 6 (10) | Dec 16, 1935 | 21 years, 274 days | Public Hall, Cleveland, Ohio, U.S. | |
| 93 | Win | 72–11–9 (1) | Davey Day | MD | 10 | Nov 8, 1935 | 21 years, 236 days | Chicago Stadium, Chicago, Illinois, U.S. | |
| 92 | Win | 71–11–9 (1) | Jimmy Christy | SD | 10 | Oct 4, 1935 | 21 years, 201 days | Chicago Stadium, Chicago, Illinois, U.S. | |
| 91 | Win | 70–11–9 (1) | Mickey Genaro | PTS | 10 | Sep 9, 1935 | 21 years, 176 days | Quincy, Illinois, U.S. | |
| 90 | Loss | 69–11–9 (1) | Fillo Echevarria | PTS | 10 | Jul 6, 1935 | 21 years, 111 days | Havana, Cuba | |
| 89 | Loss | 69–10–9 (1) | Rodolfo Casanova | PTS | 12 | Jun 8, 1935 | 21 years, 83 days | Arena Nacional, Mexico City, Distrito Federal, Mexico | |
| 88 | Win | 69–9–9 (1) | Frankie Wallace | TKO | 6 (10) | Mar 31, 1935 | 21 years, 14 days | El Toreo de Cuatro Caminos, Mexico City, Distrito Federal, Mexico | |
| 87 | Win | 68–9–9 (1) | Timoteo Elizalde | PTS | 10 | Feb 24, 1935 | 20 years, 344 days | Puebla, Puebla, Mexico | |
| 86 | Win | 67–9–9 (1) | Chalky Wright | KO | 4 (10) | Feb 2, 1935 | 20 years, 322 days | Arena Nacional, Mexico City, Distrito Federal, Mexico | |
| 85 | Win | 66–9–9 (1) | Henry Armstrong | UD | 12 | Jan 1, 1935 | 20 years, 290 days | El Toreo de Cuatro Caminos, Mexico City, Distrito Federal, Mexico | |
| 84 | Win | 65–9–9 (1) | Henry Armstrong | PTS | 10 | Nov 4, 1934 | 20 years, 232 days | Arena Nacional, Mexico City, Distrito Federal, Mexico | |
| 83 | Win | 64–9–9 (1) | Mike Belloise | UD | 15 | Aug 30, 1934 | 20 years, 166 days | Dyckman Oval, Manhattan, New York City, New York, U.S. | Won vacant NYSAC featherweight title |
| 82 | Win | 63–9–9 (1) | Al Roth | PTS | 10 | May 11, 1934 | 20 years, 55 days | Madison Square Garden, Manhattan, New York City, New York, U.S. | |
| 81 | Loss | 62–9–9 (1) | Tony Canzoneri | PTS | 10 | Mar 13, 1934 | 19 years, 361 days | Olympic Auditorium, Los Angeles, California, U.S. | |
| 80 | Win | 62–8–9 (1) | Al Greenfield | KO | 3 (10) | Feb 23, 1934 | 19 years, 343 days | Liberty Hall, El Paso, Texas, U.S. | |
| 79 | Win | 61–8–9 (1) | Mark Diaz | TKO | 9 (10) | Feb 9, 1934 | 19 years, 329 days | Pismo Beach Arena, Pismo Beach, California, U.S. | |
| 78 | Win | 60–8–9 (1) | Mark Diaz | PTS | 10 | Jan 23, 1934 | 19 years, 312 days | Olympic Auditorium, Los Angeles, California, U.S. | |
| 77 | Win | 59–8–9 (1) | Eddie Shea | PTS | 10 | Nov 28, 1933 | 19 years, 256 days | Olympic Auditorium, Los Angeles, California, U.S. | |
| 76 | Win | 58–8–9 (1) | Eddie Shea | PTS | 10 | Nov 7, 1933 | 19 years, 235 days | Olympic Auditorium, Los Angeles, California, U.S. | |
| 75 | Win | 57–8–9 (1) | Cris Pineda | PTS | 10 | Sep 8, 1933 | 19 years, 175 days | Legion Stadium, Hollywood, California, U.S. | |
| 74 | Win | 56–8–9 (1) | Baby Palmore | PTS | 10 | Jul 21, 1933 | 19 years, 126 days | Legion Stadium, Hollywood, California, U.S. | |
| 73 | Loss | 55–8–9 (1) | Clever Sison | PTS | 10 | Jul 4, 1933 | 19 years, 109 days | Memorial Auditorium, Sacramento, California, U.S. | |
| 72 | Win | 55–7–9 (1) | Freddie Miller | PTS | 10 | Jun 12, 1933 | 19 years, 87 days | Exposition Auditorium, San Francisco, California, U.S. | |
| 71 | Win | 54–7–9 (1) | Mickey Cohen | KO | 3 (10) | May 14, 1933 | 19 years, 58 days | Foreign Club Arena, Tijuana, Baja California, Mexico | |
| 70 | Win | 53–7–9 (1) | Al Greenfield | KO | 4 (10) | Apr 30, 1933 | 19 years, 44 days | Foreign Club Arena, Tijuana, Baja California, Mexico | |
| 69 | Win | 52–7–9 (1) | Kid Charol II | PTS | 10 | Mar 28, 1933 | 19 years, 11 days | Olympic Auditorium, Los Angeles, California, U.S. | |
| 68 | Loss | 51–7–9 (1) | Young Tommy | PTS | 10 | Mar 15, 1933 | 18 years, 363 days | Civic Auditorium, San Francisco, California, U.S. | |
| 67 | Loss | 51–6–9 (1) | Freddie Miller | PTS | 10 | Feb 28, 1933 | 18 years, 348 days | Olympic Auditorium, Los Angeles, California, U.S. | Lost world featherweight title (California version); For NBA featherweight title |
| 66 | Win | 51–5–9 (1) | Speedy Dado | PTS | 10 | Jan 24, 1933 | 18 years, 313 days | Olympic Auditorium, Los Angeles, California, U.S. | Retained world featherweight title (California version) |
| 65 | Win | 50–5–9 (1) | Archie Bell | PTS | 10 | Jan 6, 1933 | 18 years, 295 days | Dreamland Auditorium, San Francisco, California, U.S. | Retained world featherweight title (California version) |
| 64 | Win | 49–5–9 (1) | Rodolfo Teglia | RTD | 3 (10) | Dec 16, 1932 | 18 years, 274 days | Madison Square Garden, Phoenix, Arizona, U.S. | |
| 63 | Win | 48–5–9 (1) | Archie Bell | PTS | 10 | Dec 2, 1932 | 18 years, 260 days | Legion Stadium, Hollywood, California, U.S. | Retained world featherweight title (California version) |
| 62 | Draw | 47–5–9 (1) | Varias Milling | PTS | 10 | Nov 22, 1932 | 18 years, 250 days | Olympic Auditorium, Los Angeles, California, U.S. | Retained world featherweight title (California version) |
| 61 | Win | 47–5–8 (1) | Newsboy Brown | PTS | 10 | Oct 18, 1932 | 18 years, 215 days | Olympic Auditorium, Los Angeles, California, U.S. | Won vacant world featherweight title (California version) |
| 60 | Win | 46–5–8 (1) | Tommy Paul | PTS | 10 | Sep 16, 1932 | 18 years, 183 days | El Toreo de Cuatro Caminos, Mexico City, Distrito Federal, Mexico | |
| 59 | Loss | 45–5–8 (1) | Newsboy Brown | PTS | 10 | Jun 28, 1932 | 18 years, 103 days | Olympic Auditorium, Los Angeles, California, U.S. | |
| 58 | Win | 45–4–8 (1) | Newsboy Brown | PTS | 10 | Jun 7, 1932 | 18 years, 82 days | Olympic Auditorium, Los Angeles, California, U.S. | |
| 57 | Win | 44–4–8 (1) | Lew Farber | PTS | 10 | May 3, 1932 | 18 years, 47 days | Olympic Auditorium, Los Angeles, California, U.S. | |
| 56 | Win | 43–4–8 (1) | Young Tommy | PTS | 10 | Apr 19, 1932 | 18 years, 33 days | Olympic Auditorium, Los Angeles, California, U.S. | |
| 55 | Loss | 42–4–8 (1) | Speedy Dado | PTS | 10 | Mar 18, 1932 | 18 years, 1 day | Stockton, Los Angeles, California, U.S. | |
| 54 | Win | 42–3–8 (1) | Claude Varner | PTS | 10 | Mar 1, 1932 | 17 years, 350 days | Olympic Auditorium, Los Angeles, California, U.S. | |
| 53 | Win | 41–3–8 (1) | Speedy Dado | PTS | 10 | Feb 9, 1932 | 17 years, 329 days | Olympic Auditorium, Los Angeles, California, U.S. | |
| 52 | Win | 40–3–8 (1) | Fidel LaBarba | PTS | 10 | Jan 1, 1932 | 17 years, 290 days | El Toreo de Cuatro Caminos, Mexico City, Distrito Federal, Mexico | |
| 51 | Win | 39–3–8 (1) | Eddie Cerda | PTS | 10 | Dec 12, 1931 | 17 years, 270 days | Arena Nacional, Mexico City, Distrito Federal, Mexico | |
| 50 | Win | 38–3–8 (1) | Kid Pancho | PTS | 12 | Nov 14, 1931 | 17 years, 242 days | Arena Nacional, Mexico City, Distrito Federal, Mexico | Won Mexico bantamweight title |
| 49 | Win | 37–3–8 (1) | Marcial Zavala | PTS | 10 | Oct 17, 1931 | 17 years, 214 days | Mexico City, Distrito Federal, Mexico | |
| 48 | Win | 36–3–8 (1) | Jorge Rendon | PTS | 10 | Oct 3, 1931 | 17 years, 200 days | Arena Nacional, Mexico City, Distrito Federal, Mexico | |
| 47 | Win | 35–3–8 (1) | Rodolfo Teglia | PTS | 10 | Sep 26, 1931 | 17 years, 193 days | Mexico City, Distrito Federal, Mexico | |
| 46 | Win | 34–3–8 (1) | Blas Rodriguez | PTS | 10 | Aug 16, 1931 | 17 years, 152 days | Plaza de Toros, Torreon, Coahuila de Zaragoza, Mexico | |
| 45 | Win | 33–3–8 (1) | Pablo Alejandro | PTS | 10 | Jul 26, 1931 | 17 years, 131 days | Plaza de Toros, Torreon, Coahuila de Zaragoza, Mexico | |
| 44 | Win | 32–3–8 (1) | Rodolfo Teglia | TKO | 5 (10) | Jul 11, 1931 | 17 years, 116 days | Tampico, Tamaulipas, Mexico | |
| 43 | Win | 31–3–8 (1) | Battling Shaw | PTS | 10 | Feb 28, 1931 | 16 years, 348 days | Laredo, Texas, U.S. | |
| 42 | Draw | 30–3–8 (1) | Babe Colima | PTS | 10 | Jan 17, 1931 | 16 years, 306 days | Tampico, Tamaulipas, Mexico | |
| 41 | Draw | 30–3–7 (1) | Babe Colima | PTS | 10 | Jan 3, 1931 | 16 years, 292 days | Tampico, Tamaulipas, Mexico | |
| 40 | Win | 30–3–6 (1) | Leonardo de la Cruz | KO | 6 (10) | Nov 1, 1930 | 16 years, 229 days | Arena Mexico, Tampico, Tamaulipas, Mexico | |
| 39 | Win | 29–3–6 (1) | Kid Gorilla | PTS | 10 | Oct 11, 1930 | 16 years, 208 days | Arena Mexico, Tampico, Tamaulipas, Mexico | |
| 38 | Win | 28–3–6 (1) | Julian Villegas | PTS | 10 | Oct 4, 1930 | 16 years, 201 days | Arena Mexico, Tampico, Tamaulipas, Mexico | |
| 37 | Draw | 27–3–6 (1) | Claude Varner | PTS | 10 | Oct 1, 1930 | 16 years, 198 days | Mexico City, Distrito Federal, Mexico | Precise date unknown at this time |
| 36 | Loss | 27–3–5 (1) | Chato Laredo | PTS | 10 | May 1, 1930 | 16 years, 45 days | Arena Nacional, Mexico City, Distrito Federal, Mexico | Precise date unknown at this time |
| 35 | Win | 27–2–5 (1) | Vicente Torres | PTS | 10 | Feb 22, 1930 | 15 years, 342 days | Mexico City, Distrito Federal, Mexico | |
| 34 | Win | 26–2–5 (1) | Julian Villegas | PTS | 10 | Jan 1, 1930 | 15 years, 290 days | El Toreo de Cuatro Caminos, Mexico City, Distrito Federal, Mexico | |
| 33 | Win | 25–2–5 (1) | Leonardo de la Cruz | PTS | 10 | May 26, 1929 | 15 years, 70 days | Mexico City, Distrito Federal, Mexico | |
| 32 | Win | 24–2–5 (1) | Julian Villegas | PTS | 10 | May 4, 1929 | 15 years, 48 days | Arena Nacional, Mexico City, Distrito Federal, Mexico | |
| 31 | Win | 23–2–5 (1) | Henry Moreno | NWS | 4 | Oct 30, 1928 | 14 years, 227 days | San Antonio, Texas, U.S. | |
| 30 | Win | 22–2–5 (1) | Pedro Ortega | PTS | 6 | Oct 22, 1928 | 14 years, 219 days | City Auditorium, Galveston, Texas, U.S. | |
| 29 | Win | 21–2–5 (1) | Skeets Baker | TKO | 2 (4) | Oct 1, 1928 | 14 years, 198 days | City Auditorium, Galveston, Texas, U.S. | |
| 28 | Draw | 20–2–5 (1) | Kid Adams | NWS | 6 | Sep 25, 1928 | 14 years, 192 days | Jack Shelton Arena, San Antonio, Texas, U.S. | |
| 27 | Win | 20–2–4 (1) | Billy Cain | PTS | 6 | Aug 21, 1928 | 14 years, 157 days | Soledad Roof, San Antonio, Texas, U.S. | |
| 26 | Draw | 19–2–4 (1) | Howard Carr | PTS | 6 | Aug 15, 1928 | 14 years, 151 days | School Park Arena, Galveston, Texas, U.S. | |
| 25 | Win | 19–2–3 (1) | Skeets Baker | PTS | 6 | Jul 30, 1928 | 14 years, 135 days | Kennel Association Track, Galveston, Texas, U.S. | |
| 24 | NC | 18–2–3 (1) | Joe Montana | NC | 6 (8) | Jul 24, 1928 | 14 years, 129 days | Soledad Roof, San Antonio, Texas, U.S. | Declared NC because of lack of action. At the fans' insistence the fighters finished the remaining two rounds |
| 23 | Win | 18–2–3 | Al Bosque | NWS | 4 | Jul 10, 1928 | 14 years, 115 days | Soledad Roof, San Antonio, Texas, U.S. | |
| 22 | Win | 17–2–3 | Kid Adams | PTS | 8 | Jul 2, 1928 | 14 years, 107 days | Soledad Roof, San Antonio, Texas, U.S. | |
| 21 | Loss | 16–2–3 | Diego Acuna | RTD | 6 (10) | Jun 25, 1928 | 14 years, 100 days | Soledad Roof, San Antonio, Texas, U.S. | |
| 20 | Win | 16–1–3 | Black Panther | PTS | 6 | Jun 13, 1928 | 14 years, 88 days | Mercedes, Texas, U.S. | |
| 19 | Win | 15–1–3 | Kid Zizo | PTS | 8 | May 31, 1928 | 14 years, 75 days | Fort McIntosh Bowl, Laredo, Texas, U.S. | |
| 18 | Win | 14–1–3 | Kid Adams | NWS | 8 | May 22, 1928 | 14 years, 66 days | Business Men's A.C., San Antonio, Texas, U.S. | |
| 17 | Win | 13–1–3 | Johnny Pyle | PTS | 6 | May 10, 1928 | 14 years, 54 days | Fort Sam Houston, San Antonio, Texas, U.S. | |
| 16 | Win | 12–1–3 | Kid Luna | PTS | 8 | Apr 19, 1928 | 14 years, 33 days | Fort McIntosh Bowl, Laredo, Texas, U.S. | |
| 15 | Draw | 11–1–3 | Kid Adams | NWS | 6 | Apr 10, 1928 | 14 years, 24 days | Business Men's A.C., San Antonio, Texas, U.S. | |
| 14 | Win | 11–1–2 | Newsboy Reyes | NWS | 6 | Mar 27, 1928 | 14 years, 10 days | Business Men's A.C., San Antonio, Texas, U.S. | |
| 13 | Loss | 10–1–2 | Kid Adams | NWS | 6 | Mar 20, 1928 | 14 years, 3 days | Business Men's A.C., San Antonio, Texas, U.S. | |
| 12 | Win | 10–0–2 | Hill Hernandez | NWS | 6 | Mar 13, 1928 | 13 years, 355 days | Business Men's A.C., San Antonio, Texas, U.S. | |
| 11 | Win | 9–0–2 | Battling Herrera | TKO | 5 (6) | Mar 6, 1928 | 13 years, 355 days | Business Men's A.C., San Antonio, Texas, U.S. | |
| 10 | Win | 8–0–2 | Tony Feraci | NWS | 10 | Feb 14, 1928 | 13 years, 334 days | Business Men's A.C., San Antonio, Texas, U.S. | |
| 9 | Win | 7–0–2 | Black Panther | PTS | 6 | Dec 30, 1927 | 13 years, 288 days | Fort McIntosh Theatre, Laredo, Texas, U.S. | |
| 8 | Draw | 6–0–2 | Hill Hernandez | PTS | 6 | Nov 18, 1927 | 13 years, 246 days | Fort McIntosh Bowl, Laredo, Texas, U.S. | |
| 7 | Win | 6–0–1 | Kid Zizo | TKO | 2 (6) | Nov 11, 1927 | 13 years, 239 days | Fort McIntosh Bowl, Laredo, Texas, U.S. | |
| 6 | Draw | 5–0–1 | Chato Laredo | NWS | 10 | Oct 11, 1927 | 13 years, 208 days | Soledad Roof, San Antonio, Texas, U.S. | |
| 5 | Win | 5–0 | Baby Lincoln | KO | 1 (6) | Oct 6, 1927 | 13 years, 203 days | Fort McIntosh Bowl, Laredo, Texas, U.S. | |
| 4 | Win | 4–0 | Black Panther | PTS | 6 | Sep 22, 1927 | 13 years, 189 days | Fort McIntosh Bowl, Laredo, Texas, U.S. | |
| 3 | Win | 3–0 | Henry Moreno | PTS | 6 | Sep 8, 1927 | 13 years, 175 days | Fort McIntosh Bowl, Laredo, Texas, U.S. | |
| 2 | Win | 2–0 | Kid Zizo | KO | 6 (6) | Sep 1, 1927 | 13 years, 168 days | Fort McIntosh Bowl, Laredo, Texas, U.S. | |
| 1 | Win | 1–0 | Ray Ortiz | KO | 1 (6) | Aug 25, 1927 | 13 years, 161 days | Fort McIntosh Bowl, Laredo, Texas, U.S. | |
