= Mike Belloise =

American boxer (1911–1969)

Personal information
- Nickname: The Bronx Spider
- Nationality: (United States) American
- Born: Michael Joseph Belloise; February 18, 1911 New York City, New York, U.S.
- Died: June 2, 1969 (aged 58) Bronx, New York, U.S.
- Height: 5 ft 5 in (165cm)
- Weight: Featherweight

Boxing career
- Stance: Orthodox

Boxing record
- Total fights: 133
- Wins: 92
- Win by KO: 15
- Losses: 28
- Draws: 13

Mike Belloise (February 18, 1911 – June 2, 1969), nicknamed The Bronx Spider, was an American professional featherweight boxer who became the NYSAC world featherweight champion in 1936.

== Early life ==
Born Michael Joseph Belloise, he was the eldest of nine children born to Salvatore and Julia Belloisi in the Villa Avenue area of the Bronx, New York.

== Amateur boxing career ==
He advanced to the final of the 118-pound division at the 1931 National Amateur Boxing Championships in April, where he lost to Honey Mellody.

In November 1931, he fought in Stockholm in a Sweden vs. USA bout held at Stallmästaregården.

== Professional boxing career ==
Belloise made his professional debut in 1932, fighting at venues such as the New Lenox Sports Club, Starlight Park Stadium, St. Nicholas Arena, and later Madison Square Garden.

=== Title match with Baby Arizmendi, August 1934 ===
He failed to beat Baby Arizmendi in his first bid for the NYSAC featherweight world title on August 30, 1934.

=== Taking the NYSAC world featherweight championship, May 1936 ===
The Bronx battler faced 90-4-10 Everette Rightmire in April 1936, winning by a 14th-round TKO in the final eliminator for the division's world title. Belloise was named the NYSAC world featherweight boxing champion on May 19, 1936.

==== Notable bouts during world featherweight title reign ====
The following month, the new titleholder battled Dave Crowley in a ten-round bout that ended in a draw. Belloise went on to successfully defend the NYSAC world featherweight championship with a knockout of Dave Crowley at Madison Square Garden on September 3, 1936.

In October 1936, the featherweight champion challenged Henry Armstrong for the California-Mexico world featherweight title at the Olympic Auditorium in Los Angeles. He went the ten-round distance with the highly touted Armstrong and lost by points. In their 1937 rematch at Madison Square Garden, he suffered a TKO loss at the hands of Armstrong, who was making his East Coast debut.

==== Losing the NYSAC world featherweight championship, August 1937 ====
He was stripped of the 126-pound title by the New York State Athletic Commission on August 10, 1937.

Belloise notably defeated an unbeaten Petey Scalzo at the New York Coliseum in April 1938.

=== Title match with Joey Archibald, October 1938 ===
After Henry Armstrong vacated, Belloise failed to win his attempt for the vacant NYSAC world featherweight title against Joey Archibald at St. Nicholas Arena in October 1938.

Belloise was rated fifth in the featherweight division in The Ring magazine's 1938 annual rankings, which appeared in the February 1939 issue. In 1941, he held the eighth position among featherweights in the annual ratings of The Ring.

=== Loss against reigning NBA world lightweight champion Juan Zurita, January 1945 ===
The former titleholder went up against Juan Zurita, NBA world lightweight champion, in Houston on January 31, 1945.

His last pro bout resulted in a KO loss to Tommy Stenhouse at Dunn Field in August 1947.

== Professional boxing record ==
133 fights	92 wins	28 losses
By knockout	21	14
By decision	71	14
Draws	13	

== Death ==
Mike Belloise died on June 2, 1969, in the Bronx, New York, United States, at 58.

== Legacy ==
Belloise appeared on the cover of the March 1937 issue of The Ring magazine.

He was inducted into the New Jersey Boxing Hall of Fame on November 12, 1998.

Achievements
Preceded by Baby Arizmendi	NYSAC World Featherweight Champion; May 19, 1936 – August 10, 1937	Succeeded by Henry Armstrong
