= Doug Jones =

Doug Jones most commonly refers to:

- Doug Jones (actor) (born 1960), American actor
- Doug Jones (politician) (born 1954), former U.S. senator from Alabama

It may also refer to:

== Sports ==
- Doug Jones (American football) (born 1950)
- Doug Jones (baseball) (1957–2021), American
- Doug Jones (boxer) (1937–2017), American
- Doug Jones (curler), American

== Others ==
- Doug Jones (international arbitrator) (born 1949), Australian lawyer
- Doug Jones, a character in the 2021 film No Sudden Move
- Dougie Jones, a character in the 2017 miniseries Twin Peaks: The Return
- Doug Jones, a character in the 2017 film The VelociPastor
- Doug Jones Average, a heuristic for measuring the economy proposed by Jim Hightower

== See also ==
- Douglas Jones (disambiguation)
- List of people with surname Jones
