= Henry Armstrong =

American boxer (1912–1988)

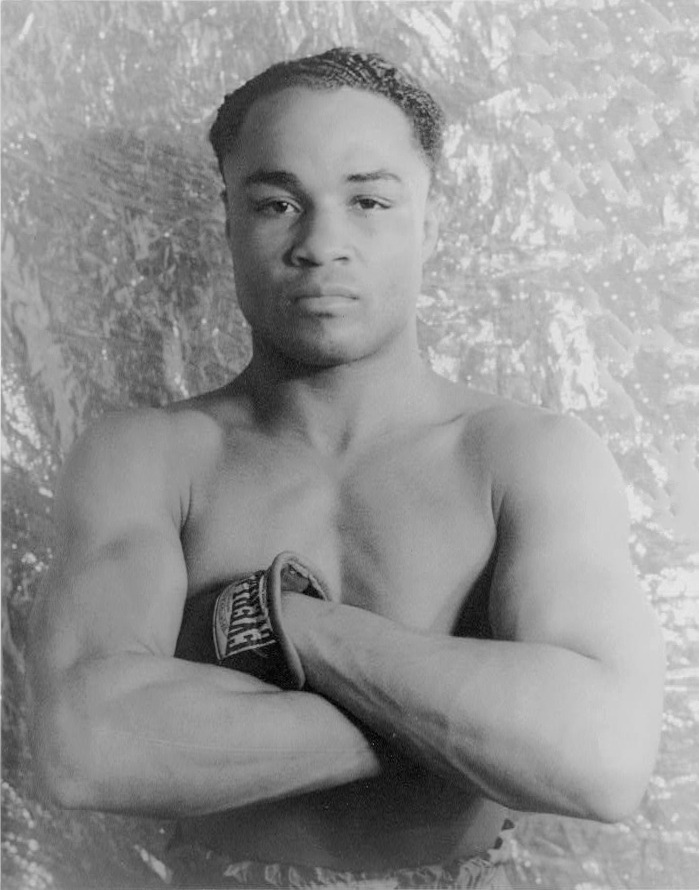
- Armstrong in 1937

Personal information
- Nicknames: Homicide Hank; Hurricane Hank; Hammerin' Hank
- Born: Henry Melody Jackson Jr. December 12, 1912 Columbus, Mississippi, U.S.
- Died: October 22, 1988 (aged 75) Los Angeles, California, U.S.
- Height: 5 ft 5 1/2 in (166 cm)
- Weight: Featherweight; Lightweight; Welterweight; Middleweight

Boxing career
- Reach: 67 in (170 cm)
- Stance: Orthodox

Boxing record
- Total fights: 183
- Wins: 151
- Win by KO: 100
- Losses: 22
- Draws: 10

Henry Jackson Jr. (December 12, 1912 – October 22, 1988) was an American professional boxer and a world boxing champion who fought under the name Henry Armstrong.

The Ring magazine named him Fighter of the Year in 1937. The Boxing Writers Association of Ame, featherweight, lightweight and welterweightica (BWAA) named him Fighter of the Year in 1940. The Sporting News recognized him as the Fighter of the Decade for the 1930s. He is currently ranked by BoxRec as the sixth-greatest pound-for-pound boxer of all time. In 2007, The Ring ranked Armstrong as the second-greatest fighter of the last 80 years. Boxing coach and commentator Teddy Atlas considers Armstrong to be the greatest of all time. Historian Bert Sugar also ranked Armstrong as the second-greatest fighter of all time. ESPN ranked Armstrong as number 3 on their list of the 50 greatest boxers of all time. He was posthumously inducted into the International Boxing Hall of Fame in the inaugural class of 1990. In 2019, the International Boxing Research Organization (IBRO) ranked him as the second best boxer of all time, pound for pound, as well as the second-best featherweight, third-best welterweight, and fifth-best lightweight of all time.

== Early life ==
He was born Henry Jackson Jr. on December 12, 1912, in Columbus, Mississippi. He was the son of Henry Jackson Sr., a sharecropper of African American descent and his mother America Jackson, a half-Cherokee. As a child, Henry Jr. moved with his family to St. Louis, Missouri, during the early period of the Great Migration of African Americans from the rural South to industrial cities of the Midwest and North. There he became involved in boxing. He graduated as an honor student from Vashon High School in St. Louis Later he took the surname Armstrong as his fighting name.

== Early career ==
Armstrong began his professional career on July 28, 1931, in a fight with Al Iovino, in which Armstrong was knocked out in three rounds. His first win came later that year, beating Sammy Burns by a decision in six. In 1932, Armstrong moved to Los Angeles, where he lost two four-round decisions in a row to Eddie Trujillo and Al Greenfield. Following these two losses, however, he started a streak of 11 wins.

In 1936, Armstrong split his time among Los Angeles, Mexico City and St. Louis. A few notable opponents of that year include Ritchie Fontaine, Baby Arizmendi, former world champion Juan Zurita, and Mike Belloise. Early in his career, he fought some fights under the ring name Melody Jackson.

In 1937 alone, Armstrong went 27–0 (26KO). Aldo Spoldi was the only opponent to take him the full 10 rounds. He knocked out Baby Casanova in three rounds, Belloise in four, Joe Rivers in three, former world champion Frankie Klick in four, and former world champion Benny Bass in four. Armstrong was given his first world title fight, for the title in the 126-pound weight class against World Featherweight Champion Petey Sarron at Madison Square Garden. Armstrong knocked Sarron out in six rounds, becoming the World Featherweight Champion.

In 1938, Armstrong started the year with seven more knockouts in a row, including one over Chalky Wright, a future world champion. The streak finally ended when Arizmendi lasted ten rounds before losing a decision to Armstrong in their fourth fight. Armstrong's streak of 27 knockout wins in a row qualifies as one of the longest knockout win streaks in the history of boxing.

Later in 1938, Armstrong, still the Featherweight division world champion, challenged Barney Ross for the title. Later a fellow member of the three division champions' club, Ross was then World Welterweight Champion. Armstrong, at 133 1/2 pounds, beat Ross, at 142 pounds, by unanimous decision, adding the World Welterweight Championship to his belt. Armstrong lost weight in order to compete in the lower weight division, and beat World Lightweight Champion Lou Ambers by split decision. Armstrong was the first boxer ever to hold world championships in three different weight divisions at the same time. He decided not to maintain the required 126-pound weight anymore and left the featherweight crown vacant.

== Welterweight defenses ==
Armstrong dedicated the next two years to defending the welterweight crown, beating, among others, Ceferino Garcia, a future World Middleweight Champion, and Bobby Pacho.

Armstrong defended his Lightweight belt in a rematch with Ambers, which he lost on a 15-round decision. After that, he concentrated once again on defending the world Welterweight title. He defended it in eight fights in a row, the last of which was a nine-round knockout win over Puerto Rico's Pedro Montañez.

Armstrong sought to become the first boxer to win world titles in four different categories in a rematch with Garcia, already the World Middleweight Champion, but the fight ended in a ten-round draw. Armstrong's attempt to win a world title in a fourth division was frustrated. According to boxing historian Bert Sugar, many commentators of the time said that Armstrong deserved the decision in this fight.

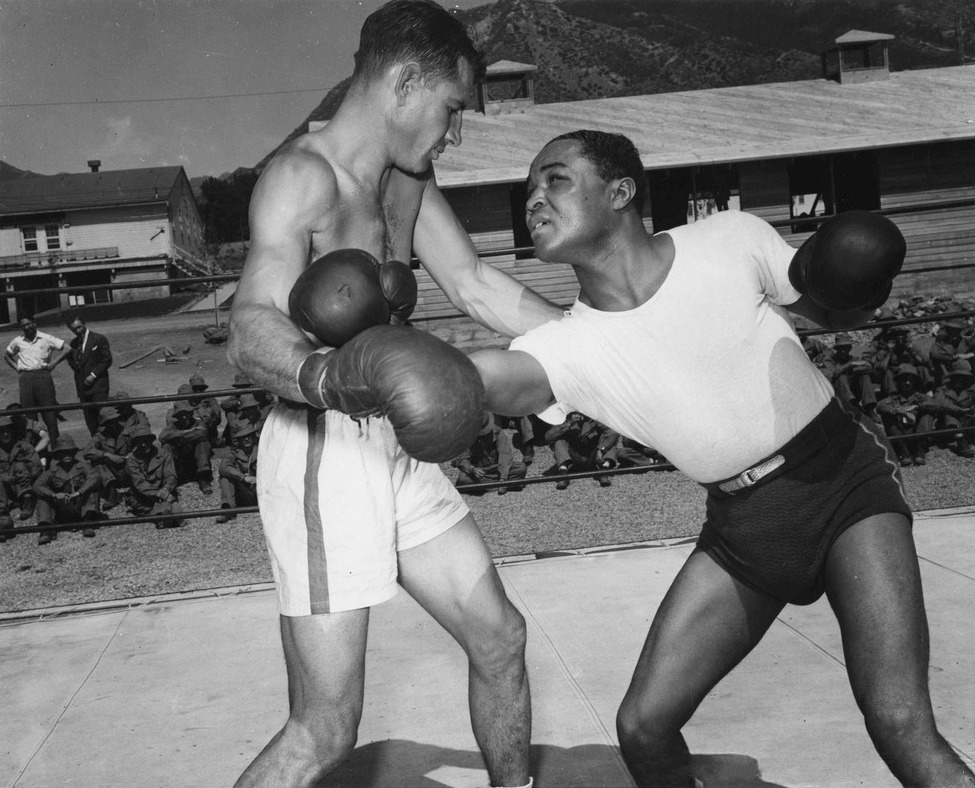
Armstrong (right) demonstrating some boxing techniques to a US Army member during an exhibition tour in 1943.

Returning to the welterweight division, Armstrong successfully defended the title five more times, until Fritzie Zivic beat him to take the world title in a 15-round decision. This ended Armstrong's reign as Welterweight Champion. Armstrong's 19 successful title defenses are still the most in history in the Welterweight division.

In 1945, Armstrong retired from boxing. His official record was 152 wins, 21 losses and 9 draws, with 101 knockout wins.

== After boxing ==
After retiring from boxing in 1946, Armstrong briefly opened a Harlem nightclub, the Melody Room (named after his first nickname). He returned to settle again in St. Louis, Missouri where, apart from the ceremonies and galas that he attended afterward, he led a quiet retirement. He became a born-again Christian and an ordained Baptist minister and youth advocate, helping to run the Herbert Hoover Boys Club. He also taught young fighters how to box. In February 1966, Rev. Armstrong appeared on the TV game show I've Got a Secret with his simultaneous triple championship as his secret. He died of heart failure in 1988.

== Honors ==
- 1937, The Ring magazine named him as Fighter of the Year.
- 1940, the Boxing Writers Association of America (BWAA) named him as Fighter of the Year.
- In 1954, Armstrong was inducted into The Ring magazine Boxing Hall of Fame the year it was established.
- In 1966, Armstrong was inducted into the Missouri Sports Hall of Fame.
- In 1987, he was among those inductees from The Ring ' list who were absorbed into the International Boxing Hall of Fame when it was established.
- In 1995, Armstrong was posthumously honored for his boxing career by being inducted into the St. Louis Walk of Fame.
- In 2007, The Ring magazine ranked Armstrong as the second-greatest fighter of the last 80 years.
- In 2007, ESPN ranked Armstrong as number 3 on their list of the 50 greatest boxers of all time.

== Professional boxing record ==
183 fights	151 wins	22 losses
By knockout	100	2
By decision	51	18
By disqualification	0	2
Draws	10	

No.	Result	Record	Opponent	Type	Round, time	Date	Age	Location	Notes
183	Loss	151–22–10	Chester Slider	PTS	10	Feb 14, 1945	35 years, 64 days	Auditorium, Oakland, California	
182	Win	151–21–10	Genaro Rojo	UD	10	Feb 6, 1945	35 years, 56 days	Olympic Auditorium, Los Angeles, California	
181	Draw	150–21–10	Chester Slider	PTS	10	Jan 17, 1945	35 years, 36 days	Auditorium, Oakland, California	
180	Win	150–21–9	Mike Belloise	KO	4 (10), 0:20	Nov 4, 1944	34 years, 328 days	Auditorium, Portland, Oregon	
179	Win	149–21–9	Aldo Spoldi	KO	2 (10), 2:43	Sep 15, 1944	34 years, 278 days	Kiel Auditorium, Saint Louis, Missouri	
178	Win	148–21–9	Willie Joyce	PTS	10	Aug 21, 1944	34 years, 253 days	Civic Auditorium, San Francisco, California	
177	Draw	147–21–9	Slugger White	PTS	10	Jul 14, 1944	34 years, 215 days	Legion Stadium, Hollywood, California	
176	Loss	147–21–8	John Thomas	UD	10	Jul 4, 1944	34 years, 205 days	Olympic Auditorium, Los Angeles, California	
175	Win	147–20–8	Nick Latsios	UD	10	Jun 21, 1944	34 years, 192 days	Madison Square Garden, New York City, New York	
174	Win	146–20–8	Al 'Bummy' Davis	TKO	2 (10), 0:59	Jun 15, 1944	34 years, 186 days	Madison Square Garden, New York City, New York	
173	Loss	145–20–8	Willie Joyce	UD	10	Jun 2, 1944	34 years, 173 days	Chicago Stadium, Chicago, Illinois	
172	Win	145–19–8	Aaron Perry	TKO	6 (10), 2:56	May 22, 1944	34 years, 162 days	Griffith Stadium, Washington, D.C.	
171	Win	144–19–8	Ralph Zannelli	UD	10	May 16, 1944	34 years, 156 days	Boston Garden, Boston, Massachusetts	
170	Win	143–19–8	John Thomas	SD	10	Apr 25, 1944	34 years, 135 days	Olympic Auditorium, Los Angeles, California	
169	Win	142–19–8	Ralph Zannelli	UD	10	Mar 24, 1944	34 years, 103 days	Boston Garden, Boston, Massachusetts	
168	Win	141–19–8	Frankie Willis	UD	10	Mar 20, 1944	34 years, 99 days	Uline Arena, Washington, D.C.	
167	Win	140–19–8	Johnny Jones	KO	5 (10), 1:10	Mar 14, 1944	34 years, 93 days	Dorsey Park, Miami, Florida	
166	Win	139–19–8	Jackie Byrd	KO	4 (10), 1:18	Feb 29, 1944	34 years, 79 days	Coliseum, Des Moines, Iowa	
165	Win	138–19–8	Jimmy Garrison	TKO	5 (10), 1:56	Feb 23, 1944	34 years, 73 days	Municipal Auditorium, Kansas City, Missouri	
164	Win	137–19–8	Lew Hanbury	KO	3 (10), 1:10	Feb 7, 1944	34 years, 57 days	Uline Arena, Washington, D.C.	
163	Win	136–19–8	Saverio Turiello	KO	7 (12), 1:34	Jan 25, 1944	34 years, 44 days	Auditorium, Portland, Oregon	
162	Win	135–19–8	Aldo Spoldi	KO	3 (10), 1:39	Jan 14, 1944	34 years, 33 days	Auditorium, Portland, Oregon	
161	Loss	134–19–8	Sugar Ray Robinson	UD	10	Aug 27, 1943	33 years, 258 days	Madison Square Garden, New York City, New York	
160	Win	134–18–8	Joey Silva	PTS	10	Aug 14, 1943	33 years, 245 days	Gonzaga Stadium, Spokane, Washington	
159	Win	133–18–8	Jimmy Garrison	PTS	10	Aug 6, 1943	33 years, 237 days	Auditorium, Portland, Oregon	
158	Win	132–18–8	Willie Joyce	UD	10	Jul 24, 1943	33 years, 224 days	Gilmore Stadium, Los Angeles, California	
157	Win	131–18–8	Sammy Angott	UD	10	Jun 11, 1943	33 years, 181 days	Madison Square Garden, New York City, New York	
156	Win	130–18–8	Maxie Shapiro	TKO	7 (10), 1:58	May 24, 1943	33 years, 163 days	Convention Hall, Philadelphia, Pennsylvania	
155	Win	129–18–8	Tommy Jessup	KO	1 (10), 1:00	May 7, 1943	33 years, 146 days	Boston Garden, Boston, Massachusetts	
154	Win	128–18–8	Saverio Turiello	TKO	5 (10)	May 3, 1943	33 years, 142 days	Uline Arena, Washington, D.C.	
153	Loss	127–18–8	Beau Jack	UD	10	Apr 2, 1943	33 years, 111 days	Madison Square Garden, New York City, New York	
152	Win	127–17–8	Al Tribuani	UD	10	Mar 22, 1943	33 years, 100 days	Convention Hall, Philadelphia, Pennsylvania	
151	Win	126–17–8	Tippy Larkin	KO	2 (10)	Mar 8, 1943	33 years, 86 days	Civic Auditorium, San Francisco, California	
150	Loss	125–17–8	Willie Joyce	MD	10	Mar 2, 1943	33 years, 80 days	Olympic Auditorium, Los Angeles, California	
149	Win	125–16–8	Jimmy McDaniels	UD	10	Jan 5, 1943	33 years, 24 days	Olympic Auditorium, Los Angeles, California	
148	Win	124–16–8	Saverio Turiello	TKO	4 (10), 1:20	Dec 14, 1942	33 years, 2 days	Civic Auditorium, San Francisco, California	
147	Win	123–16–8	Lew Jenkins	TKO	8 (10), 1:55	Dec 4, 1942	32 years, 357 days	Auditorium, Portland, Oregon	
146	Win	122–16–8	Fritzie Zivic	UD	10	Oct 26, 1942	32 years, 318 days	Civic Auditorium, San Francisco, California	
145	Win	121–16–8	Juan Zurita	KO	2 (10), 2:20	Oct 13, 1942	32 years, 305 days	Olympic Auditorium, Los Angeles, California	
144	Win	120–16–8	Earl Turner	KO	4 (10)	Sep 30, 1942	32 years, 292 days	Auditorium, Oakland, California	
143	Win	119–16–8	Leo Rodak	TKO	8 (10), 3:00	Sep 14, 1942	32 years, 276 days	Civic Auditorium, San Francisco, California	
142	Win	118–16–8	Johnny Taylor	TKO	3 (10)	Sep 7, 1942	32 years, 269 days	Arena, Pittman, Nevada	
141	Win	117–16–8	Rodolfo Ramirez	KO	8 (10), 1:38	Aug 26, 1942	32 years, 257 days	Auditorium, Oakland, California	
140	Win	116–16–8	Jackie Burke	PTS	10	Aug 13, 1942	32 years, 244 days	John Affleck Park, Ogden, Utah	
139	Win	115–16–8	Aldo Spoldi	TKO	7 (10), 2:20	Aug 3, 1942	32 years, 234 days	Civic Auditorium, San Francisco, California	
138	Win	114–16–8	Joe Ybarra	TKO	3 (10)	Jul 20, 1942	32 years, 220 days	Memorial Auditorium, Sacramento, California	
137	Loss	113–16–8	Rueben Shank	UD	10	Jul 3, 1942	32 years, 203 days	Municipal Auditorium, Denver, Colorado	
136	Win	113–15–8	Sheik Rangel	PTS	10	Jun 24, 1942	32 years, 194 days	Auditorium, Oakland, California	
135	Win	112–15–8	Johnny Taylor	TKO	4 (10)	Jun 1, 1942	32 years, 171 days	Civic Auditorium, San Jose, California	
134	Loss	111–15–8	Fritzie Zivic	TKO	12 (15), 0:52	Jan 17, 1941	31 years, 36 days	Madison Square Garden, New York City, New York	For NYSAC, NBA, and The Ring welterweight titles
133	Loss	111–14–8	Fritzie Zivic	UD	15	Oct 4, 1940	30 years, 297 days	Madison Square Garden, New York City, New York	Lost NYSAC, NBA, and The Ring welterweight titles
132	Win	111–13–8	Phil Furr	KO	4 (15), 1:45	Sep 23, 1940	30 years, 286 days	Griffith Stadium, Washington, D.C.	Retained NYSAC, NBA, and The Ring welterweight titles
131	Win	110–13–8	Lew Jenkins	TKO	6 (12)	Jul 17, 1940	30 years, 218 days	Polo Grounds, New York City, New York	
130	Win	109–13–8	Paul Junior	TKO	3 (15), 2:39	Jun 21, 1940	30 years, 192 days	Exposition Building, Portland, Oregon	Retained NYSAC, NBA, and The Ring welterweight titles
129	Win	108–13–8	Ralph Zannelli	TKO	5 (15), 1:30	May 24, 1940	30 years, 164 days	Boston Garden, Boston, Massachusetts	Retained NYSAC, NBA, and The Ring welterweight titles
128	Win	107–13–8	Paul Junior	TKO	7 (15), 1:05	Apr 26, 1940	30 years, 136 days	Boston Garden, Boston, Massachusetts	Retained NYSAC, NBA, and The Ring welterweight titles
127	Draw	106–13–8	Ceferino Garcia	PTS	10	Mar 1, 1940	30 years, 80 days	Gilmore Stadium, Los Angeles, California	Billed as a World Middleweight Title fight recognized only by California
126	Win	106–13–7	Pedro Montañez	TKO	9 (15), 0:47	Jan 24, 1940	30 years, 43 days	Madison Square Garden, New York City, New York	Retained NYSAC, NBA, and The Ring welterweight titles
125	Win	105–13–7	Joe Ghnouly	KO	5 (15), 0:34	Jan 4, 1940	30 years, 23 days	Municipal Audiotrium, Saint Louis, Missouri	Retained NYSAC, NBA, and The Ring welterweight titles
124	Win	104–13–7	Jimmy Garrison	KO	7 (10), 1:19	Dec 11, 1939	29 years, 364 days	Arena, Cleveland, Ohio	Retained NYSAC, NBA, and The Ring welterweight titles
123	Win	103–13–7	Bobby Pacho	TKO	4 (15)	Oct 30, 1939	29 years, 322 days	Municipal Auditorium, Denver, Colorado	Retained NYSAC, NBA, and The Ring welterweight titles
122	Win	102–13–7	Jimmy Garrison	PTS	10	Oct 24, 1939	29 years, 316 days	Olympic Auditorium, Los Angeles, California	Retained NYSAC, NBA, and The Ring welterweight titles
121	Win	101–13–7	Richie Fontaine	TKO	3 (15)	Oct 20, 1939	29 years, 312 days	Civic Auditorium, Seattle, Washington	Retained NYSAC, NBA, and The Ring welterweight titles
120	Win	100–13–7	Howard Scott	KO	2 (10), 1:38	Oct 13, 1939	29 years, 305 days	Armory, Minneapolis, Minnesota	Retained NYSAC, NBA, and The Ring welterweight titles
119	Win	99–13–7	Al Manfredo	TKO	4 (10), 1:35	Oct 9, 1939	29 years, 301 days	Riverview Park, Des Moines, Iowa	Retained NYSAC, NBA, and The Ring welterweight titles
118	Loss	98–13–7	Lou Ambers	UD	15	Aug 22, 1939	29 years, 253 days	Yankee Stadium, New York City, New York	Lost NYSAC, NBA, and The Ring lightweight titles
117	Win	98–12–7	Ernie Roderick	PTS	15	May 25, 1939	29 years, 164 days	Harringay Arena, Harringay, London, England	Retained NYSAC, NBA, and The Ring welterweight titles
116	Win	97–12–7	Davey Day	TKO	12 (15), 2:49	Mar 31, 1939	29 years, 109 days	Madison Square Garden, New York City, New York	Retained NYSAC, NBA, and The Ring welterweight titles
115	Win	96–12–7	Lew Feldman	KO	1 (15), 2:12	Mar 16, 1939	29 years, 94 days	Municipal Audtiorium, Saint Louis, Missouri	Retained NYSAC, NBA, and The Ring welterweight titles; Retained NYSAC, NBA, and The Ring lightweight titles
114	Win	95–12–7	Bobby Pacho	TKO	4 (15), 1:10	Mar 4, 1939	29 years, 82 days	Tropical Stadium, Havana, Cuba	Retained NYSAC, NBA, and The Ring welterweight titles
113	Win	94–12–7	Baby Arizmendi	PTS	10	Jan 10, 1939	29 years, 29 days	Olympic Auditorium, Los Angeles, California	Retained NYSAC, NBA, and The Ring welterweight titles
112	Win	93–12–7	Al Manfredo	TKO	3 (15), 1:45	Dec 5, 1938	28 years, 358 days	Arena, Cleveland, Ohio	Retained NYSAC, NBA, and The Ring welterweight titles
111	Win	92–12–7	Ceferino Garcia	UD	15	Nov 25, 1938	28 years, 348 days	Madison Square Garden, New York City, New York	Retained NYSAC, NBA, and The Ring welterweight titles
110	Win	91–12–7	Lou Ambers	SD	15	Aug 17, 1938	28 years, 248 days	Madison Square Garden, New York City, New York	Won NYSAC, NBA, and The Ring lightweight titles
109	Win	90–12–7	Barney Ross	UD	15	May 31, 1938	28 years, 170 days	Madison Square Garden Bowl, New York City, New York	Won NYSAC, NBA, and The Ring welterweight titles
108	Win	89–12–7	Lew Feldman	KO	5 (10), 1:51	Mar 30, 1938	28 years, 108 days	Hippodrome, New York City, New York	
107	Win	88–12–7	Eddie Zivic	TKO	4 (10), 2:35	Mar 25, 1938	28 years, 103 days	Olympia Stadium, Detroit, Michigan	
106	Win	87–12–7	Baby Arizmendi	PTS	10	Mar 15, 1938	28 years, 93 days	Olympic Auditorium, Los Angeles, California	
105	Win	86–12–7	Charley Burns	KO	2 (10), 1:02	Feb 28, 1938	28 years, 78 days	Armory, Minneapolis, Minnesota	
104	Win	85–12–7	Everett Rightmire	TKO	3 (10), 1:38	Feb 25, 1938	28 years, 75 days	International Amphitheatre, Chicago, Illinois	
103	Win	84–12–7	Al Citrino	TKO	4 (10)	Feb 9, 1938	28 years, 59 days	Civic Auditorium, San Francisco, California	
102	Win	83–12–7	Chalky Wright	KO	3 (10), 1:10	Feb 1, 1938	28 years, 51 days	Olympic Auditorium, Los Angeles, California	
101	Win	82–12–7	Tommy Brown	KO	2 (10), 1:21	Jan 22, 1938	28 years, 41 days	Labor Temple, Tucson, Arizona	
100	Win	81–12–7	Frankie Castillo	TKO	3 (10)	Jan 21, 1938	28 years, 40 days	Legion Arena, Phoenix, Arizona	
99	Win	80–12–7	Enrico Venturi	KO	6 (10), 2:49	Jan 12, 1938	28 years, 31 days	Madison Square Garden, New York City, New York	
98	Win	79–12–7	Johnny Jones	KO	2 (10), 1:20	Dec 12, 1937	28 years, 0 days	Coliseum Arena, New Orleans, Louisiana	
97	Win	78–12–7	Tony Chavez	TKO	1 (10), 2:04	Dec 6, 1937	27 years, 359 days	Arena, Cleveland, Ohio	
96	Win	77–12–7	Joey Brown	KO	2 (10), 0:39	Nov 23, 1937	27 years, 346 days	Broadway Auditorium, Buffalo, New York	
95	Win	76–12–7	Billy Beauhuld	TKO	5 (10)	Nov 19, 1937	27 years, 342 days	Madison Square Garden, New York City, New York	
94	Win	75–12–7	Petey Sarron	KO	6 (15), 2:36	Oct 29, 1937	27 years, 321 days	Madison Square Garden, New York City, New York	Won NBA, The Ring, and vacant NYSAC featherweight titles
93	Win	74–12–7	Joe Marciente	KO	3 (10), 2:06	Oct 18, 1937	27 years, 310 days	Arena, Philadelphia, Pennsylvania	
92	Win	73–12–7	Bobby Dean	KO	1 (10), 1:02	Sep 21, 1937	27 years, 283 days	Rayen-Wood Auditorium, Youngstown, Ohio	
91	Win	72–12–7	Johnny DeFoe	TKO	4 (10), 1:12	Sep 16, 1937	27 years, 278 days	Madison Square Garden, New York City, New York	
90	Win	71–12–7	Charley Burns	KO	4 (10), 2:45	Sep 9, 1937	27 years, 271 days	Hickey Park, Millvale, Pennsylvania	
89	Win	70–12–7	Orville Drouillard	TKO	5 (10)	Aug 31, 1937	27 years, 262 days	University of Detroit Stadium, Detroit, Michigan	
88	Win	69–12–7	Johnny Cabello	RTD	1 (10)	Aug 16, 1937	27 years, 247 days	Griffith Stadium, Washington, D.C.	
87	Win	68–12–7	Eddie Brink	KO	3 (10), 2:36	Aug 13, 1937	27 years, 244 days	Dyckman Oval, New York City, New York	
86	Win	67–12–7	Benny Bass	KO	4 (10), 2:35	Jul 27, 1937	27 years, 227 days	Baker Bowl, Philadelphia, Pennsylvania	
85	Win	66–12–7	Lew Massey	TKO	4 (10), 1:20	Jul 19, 1937	27 years, 219 days	Dexter Park Arena, Woodhaven, New York City, New York	
84	Win	65–12–7	Alf Blatch	TKO	3 (10), 1:21	Jul 8, 1937	27 years, 208 days	Madison Square Garden, New York City, New York	
83	Win	64–12–7	Jackie Carter	TKO	3 (10), 2:02	Jun 15, 1937	27 years, 185 days	Olympic Auditorium, Los Angeles, California	
82	Win	63–12–7	Mark Diaz	KO	4 (10), 0:35	Jun 9, 1937	27 years, 179 days	Pasadena Arean, Pasadena, California	
81	Win	62–12–7	Wally Hally	TKO	4 (10), 0:50	May 28, 1937	27 years, 167 days	Wrigley Field, Los Angeles, California	
80	Win	61–12–7	Frankie Klick	TKO	4 (10), 2:57	May 4, 1937	27 years, 143 days	Olympic Auditorium, Los Angeles, California	
79	Win	60–12–7	Pete DeGrasse	KO	10 (10), 2:37	Apr 6, 1937	27 years, 115 days	Olympic Auditorium, Los Angeles, California	
78	Win	59–12–7	Aldo Spoldi	UD	10	Mar 19, 1937	27 years, 97 days	Madison Square Garden, New York City, New York	
77	Win	58–12–7	Mike Belloise	TKO	4 (10)	Mar 12, 1937	27 years, 90 days	Madison Square Garden, New York City, New York	
76	Win	57–12–7	'California' Joe Rivers	TKO	4 (10), 2:40	Mar 2, 1937	27 years, 80 days	Olympic Auditorium, Los Angeles, California	
75	Win	56–12–7	Varias Milling	KO	4 (10), 2:25	Feb 19, 1937	27 years, 69 days	Coliseum, San Diego, California	
74	Win	55–12–7	Moon Mullins	TKO	2 (10), 1:20	Feb 2, 1937	27 years, 52 days	Olympic Auditorium, Los Angeles, California	
73	Win	54–12–7	Tony Chavez	KO	10 (10)	Jan 19, 1937	27 years, 38 days	Olympic Auditorium, Los Angeles, California	
72	Win	53–12–7	Rodolfo Casanova	KO	3 (10)	Jan 1, 1937	27 years, 20 days	El Toreo de Cuatro Caminos, Mexico City	
71	Loss	52–12–7	Tony Chavez	DQ	8 (10)	Dec 3, 1936	26 years, 357 days	Municipal Auditorium, Saint Louis, Missouri	
70	Win	52–11–7	Joey Alcanter	RTD	5 (10)	Nov 17, 1936	26 years, 341 days	Municipal Auditorium, Saint Louis, Missouri	
69	Win	51–11–7	Gene Espinoza	KO	1 (10), 0:34	Nov 2, 1936	26 years, 326 days	Eastside Arena, Los Angeles, California	
68	Win	50–11–7	Mike Belloise	PTS	10	Oct 27, 1936	26 years, 320 days	Olympic Auditorium, Los Angeles, California	Retained world featherweight title (California–Mexico)
67	Win	49–11–7	Dommy Ganzon	KO	1 (10), 1:54	Sep 8, 1936	26 years, 271 days	Civic Auditorium, Stockton, California	
66	Win	48–11–7	Elmer "Buzz" Brown	PTS	10	Sep 3, 1936	26 years, 266 days	Multnomah Stadium, Portland, Oregon	
65	Win	47–11–7	Juan Zurita	KO	4 (10), 2:10	Aug 18, 1936	26 years, 250 days	Olympic Auditorium, Los Angeles, California	
64	Win	46–11–7	Baby Arizmendi	PTS	10	Aug 4, 1936	26 years, 236 days	Wrigley Field, Los Angeles, California	Won world featherweight title (California-Mexico)
63	Win	45–11–7	Johnny DeFoe	PTS	10	Jun 22, 1936	26 years, 193 days	Fox Theatre, Butte, Montana	
62	Win	44–11–7	Bobby Leyvas	TKO	4 (10), 0:40	May 19, 1936	26 years, 159 days	Olympic Auditorium, Los Angeles, California	Retained USA California State featherweight title
61	Win	43–11–7	Richie Fontaine	PTS	10	Mar 31, 1936	26 years, 110 days	Olympic Auditorium, Los Angeles, California	
60	Loss	42–11–7	Richie Fontaine	PTS	10	Feb 26, 1936	26 years, 76 days	Auditorium, Oakland, California	
59	Loss	42–10–7	Joe Conde	PTS	10	Jan 1, 1936	26 years, 20 days	El Toreo de Cuatro Caminos, Mexico City	
58	Win	42–9–7	Alton Black	TKO	8 (15)	Dec 6, 1935	25 years, 359 days	Chestnut St. Arena, Reno, Nevada	Retained Western featherweight title
57	Win	41–9–7	Midget Wolgast	PTS	10	Nov 27, 1935	25 years, 350 days	Auditorium, Oakland, California	
56	Win	40–9–7	Leo Lomelli	TKO	6 (8)	Nov 12, 1935	25 years, 335 days	Auditorium, Oakland, California	
55	Win	39–9–7	Lester Marston	TKO	7 (10)	Oct 21, 1935	25 years, 313 days	Auditorium, Oakland, California	
54	Draw	38–9–7	Perfecto Lopez	PTS	8	Sep 18, 1935	25 years, 280 days	Civic Auditorium, San Francisco, California	
53	Win	38–9–6	Alton Black	TKO	8 (10)	Sep 13, 1935	25 years, 275 days	Chestnut St. Arena, Reno, Nevada	Won Western featherweight title
52	Win	37–9–6	Varias Milling	PTS	10	Jun 25, 1935	25 years, 195 days	Olympic Auditorium, Los Angeles, California	
51	Win	36–9–6	Davey Abad	PTS	10	May 28, 1935	25 years, 167 days	Olympic Auditorium, Los Angeles, California	
50	Win	35–9–6	Mark Diaz	PTS	8	May 10, 1935	25 years, 149 days	Ventura A.C., Ventura, California	
49	Win	34–9–6	Frankie Covelli	PTS	8	Apr 16, 1935	25 years, 125 days	Olympic Auditorium, Los Angeles, California	
48	Win	33–9–6	Tully Corvo	TKO	5 (10)	Apr 6, 1935	25 years, 115 days	L Street Arena, Sacramento, California	
47	Loss	32–9–6	Davey Abad	PTS	10	Mar 31, 1935	25 years, 109 days	El Toreo de Cuatro Caminos, Mexico City	
46	Win	32–8–6	Sal Hernandez	TKO	2 (10), 2:57	Mar 19, 1935	25 years, 97 days	Olympic Auditorium, Los Angeles, California	
45	Loss	31–8–6	Rodolfo Casanova	DQ	5 (10)	Feb 16, 1935	25 years, 66 days	Arena Nacional, Mexico City	
44	Loss	31–7–6	Baby Arizmendi	UD	12	Jan 1, 1935	25 years, 20 days	El Toreo de Cuatro Caminos, Mexico City	
43	Win	31–6–6	Ventura Arana	TKO	5 (10)	Dec 15, 1934	25 years, 3 days	El Toreo de Cuatro Caminos, Mexico City	
42	Win	30–6–6	Joe Conde	TKO	7 (10)	Dec 1, 1934	24 years, 354 days	Arena Nacional, Mexico City	
41	Loss	29–6–6	Baby Arizmendi	PTS	10	Nov 4, 1934	24 years, 327 days	Arena Nacional, Mexico City	
40	Win	29–5–6	Perfecto Lopez	PTS	8	Sep 28, 1934	24 years, 290 days	Ventura A.C., Ventura, California	
39	Win	28–5–6	Max Tarley	KO	3 (10)	Sep 13, 1934	24 years, 275 days	Memorial Auditorium, Sacramento, California	
38	Win	27–5–6	Joe Sanchez	TKO	4 (8)	Sep 7, 1934	24 years, 269 days	Ventura A.C., Ventura, California	
37	Win	26–5–6	Perfecto Lopez	TKO	5 (6)	Aug 28, 1934	24 years, 259 days	Olympic Auditorium, Los Angeles, California	
36	Win	25–5–6	Perfecto Lopez	PTS	6	Jul 17, 1934	24 years, 187 days	Olympic Auditorium, Los Angeles, California	
35	Win	24–5–6	Davey Abad	PTS	10	Jun 14, 1934	24 years, 184 days	Memorial Auditorium, Sacramento, California	
34	Win	23–5–6	Vicente Torres	PTS	4	Jun 5, 1934	24 years, 175 days	Olympic Auditorium, Los Angeles, California	
33	Win	22–5–6	Johnny DeFoe	TKO	6 (6), 2:10	May 22, 1934	24 years, 161 days	Olympic Auditorium, Los Angeles, California	
32	Draw	21–5–6	Kid Moro	PTS	10	May 4, 1934	24 years, 143 days	Civic Auditorium, Watsonville, California	
31	Win	21–5–5	Young Danny	KO	1 (4)	Mar 27, 1934	24 years, 105 days	Olympic Auditorium, Los Angeles, California	
30	Win	20–5–5	Perfecto Lopez	PTS	8	Mar 6, 1934	24 years, 84 days	Bakersfield Arena, Bakersfield, California	
29	Win	19–5–5	Benny Pelz	PTS	6	Feb 13, 1934	24 years, 63 days	Memorial Auditorium, Sacramento, California	
28	Win	18–5–5	Baby Manuel	PTS	10	Jan 26, 1934	24 years, 45 days	Memorial Auditorium, Sacramento, California	
27	Win	17–5–5	Gene Espinoza	TKO	7 (10)	Dec 14, 1933	24 years, 2 days	Memorial Auditorium, Sacramento, California	
26	Draw	16–5–5	Kid Moro	PTS	10	Nov 23, 1933	23 years, 346 days	Civic Auditorium, Stockton, California	
25	Win	16–5–4	Kid Moro	PTS	10	Nov 3, 1933	23 years, 326 days	Pismo Beach Arena, Pismo Beach, California	
24	Win	15–5–4	Johnny Granone	TKO	6 (6)	Oct 19, 1933	23 years, 311 days	Memorial Auditorium, Sacramento, California	
23	Draw	14–5–4	Perfecto Lopez	PTS	4	Oct 11, 1933	23 years, 303 days	Olympic Auditorium, Los Angeles, California	
22	Draw	14–5–3	Perfecto Lopez	PTS	4	Sep 5, 1933	23 years, 267 days	Olympic Auditorium, Los Angeles, California	
21	Draw	14–5–2	Hoyt Jones	PTS	4	Aug 30, 1933	23 years, 261 days	Olympic Auditorium, Los Angeles, California	
20	Win	14–5–1	Bobby Calmes	KO	5 (6)	Aug 8, 1933	23 years, 239 days	Olympic Auditorium, Los Angeles, California	
19	Win	13–5–1	Benny Pelz	PTS	4	Jul 29, 1933	23 years, 229 days	Main Street Athletic Club, Los Angeles, California	
18	Loss	12–5–1	Baby Manuel	PTS	6	Jul 11, 1933	23 years, 211 days	Olympic Auditorium, Los Angeles, California	
17	Win	12–4–1	George Haberski	PTS	4	Jun 28, 1933	23 years, 198 days	Wilmington Bowl, Wilmington, California	
16	Win	11–4–1	Ricky Hall	KO	3 (4)	Jun 7, 1933	23 years, 177 days	Pismo Beach Arena, Pismo Beach, California	
15	Draw	10–4–1	Max Tarley	PTS	6	May 31, 1933	23 years, 170 days	Pico Arena, Los Angeles, California	
14	Win	10–4	Young Bud Taylor	KO	2 (4)	May 24, 1933	23 years, 163 days	Pico Arena, Los Angeles, California	
13	Win	9–4	Perfecto Lopez	PTS	6	Apr 28, 1933	23 years, 137 days	Ventura A.C., Ventura, California	
12	Win	8–4	Paul Wangley	KO	4 (4)	Mar 21, 1933	23 years, 99 days	Olympic Auditorium, Los Angeles, California	
11	Win	7–4	George Dundee	PTS	6	Feb 17, 1933	23 years, 67 days	Ventura A.C., Ventura, California	
10	Win	6–4	Johnny Ryan	PTS	6	Feb 3, 1933	23 years, 53 days	Ventura A.C., Ventura, California	
9	Win	5–4	Young Corpuz	PTS	4	Dec 31, 1932	23 years, 19 days	Pismo Beach Arena, Pismo Beach, California	
8	Win	4–4	Gene Espinoza	PTS	4	Dec 13, 1932	23 years, 1 day	Olympic Auditorium, Los Angeles, California	
7	Win	3–4	Vince Trujillo	KO	2 (?)	Dec 1, 1932	22 years, 355 days	Los Angeles, California	
6	Win	2–4	Max Tarley	PTS	4	Oct 1, 1932	22 years, 294 days	Los Angeles, California	
5	Loss	1–4	Al Greenfield	PTS	4	Sep 27, 1932	22 years, 290 days	Olympic Auditorium, Los Angeles, California	
4	Loss	1–3	Eddie Trujillo	PTS	4	Aug 30, 1932	22 years, 262 days	Olympic Auditorium, Los Angeles, California	
3	Loss	1–2	Victor Kid Ponce	PTS	4	Dec 7, 1931	21 years, 360 days	Culver City Stadium, Culver City, California	
2	Win	1–1	Sammy Burns	PTS	6	Jul 31, 1931	21 years, 231 days	Hickey Park, Millvale, Pennsylvania	
1	Loss	0–1	Al Iovino	KO	3 (4), 2:27	Jul 27, 1931	21 years, 227 days	Meyers Bowl, North Braddock, Pennsylvania	

== Titles in boxing ==
=== Major world titles ===
- NYSAC featherweight champion (126 lbs)
- NBA (WBA) featherweight champion (126 lbs)
- NYSAC lightweight champion (135 lbs)
- NBA (WBA) lightweight champion (135 lbs)
- NYSAC welterweight champion (147 lbs)
- NBA (WBA) welterweight champion (147 lbs)

=== The Ring magazine titles ===
- The Ring featherweight champion (126 lbs)
- The Ring lightweight champion (135 lbs)
- The Ring welterweight champion (147 lbs)

=== Regional titles ===
- California State featherweight champion (126 lbs)
- California–Mexico featherweight champion (126 lbs)

=== Undisputed titles ===
- Undisputed featherweight champion
- Undisputed lightweight champion
- Undisputed welterweight champion

== See also ==
- Undisputed championship
- Lineal championship
- List of boxing triple champions

Sporting positions
World boxing titles
Preceded by Battling Battalino	NYSAC featherweight champion October 29, 1937 – September 12, 1938; Vacated	Vacant Title next held by Joey Archibald
Preceded by Battling Battalino	NBA featherweight champion October 29, 1937 – September 12, 1938; Vacated	Vacant Title next held by Joey Archibald
Preceded by Battling Battalino	The Ring featherweight champion October 29, 1937 – September 12, 1938; Vacated	Vacant Title next held by Joey Archibald
Preceded by Battling Battalino	Undisputed featherweight champion October 29, 1937 – September 12, 1938; Vacated	Vacant Title next held by Joey Archibald
Preceded by Barney Ross	NYSAC welterweight champion May 31, 1938 – October 4, 1940	Succeeded by Fritzie Zivic
Preceded by Barney Ross	NBA welterweight champion May 31, 1938 – October 4, 1940	Succeeded by Fritzie Zivic
Preceded by Barney Ross	The Ring welterweight champion May 31, 1938 – October 4, 1940	Succeeded by Fritzie Zivic
Preceded by Barney Ross	Undisputed welterweight champion May 31, 1938 – October 4, 1940	Succeeded by Fritzie Zivic
Preceded by Lou Ambers	NYSAC lightweight champion August 17, 1938 – August 22, 1939	Succeeded by Lou Ambers
Preceded by Lou Ambers	NBA lightweight champion August 17, 1938 – August 22, 1939	Succeeded by Lou Ambers
Preceded by Lou Ambers	The Ring lightweight champion August 17, 1938 – August 22, 1939	Succeeded by Lou Ambers
Preceded by Lou Ambers	Undisputed lightweight champion August 17, 1938 – August 22, 1939	Succeeded by Lou Ambers
Awards
Preceded by Joe Louis	The Ring magazine Fighter of the Year; 1937	Succeeded by Joe Louis
Preceded by Billy Conn	BWAA Fighter of the Year; 1940	Succeeded by Joe Louis
Records
New record	Only simultaneous three-division world champion August 17, 1938 – present	Incumbent
