= Sammy Luftspring =

Canadian boxer (1916–2000)

Personal information
- Nationality: Canadian
- Born: Sammy Luftspring; May 14, 1916 Toronto, Ontario
- Died: September 27, 2000 (aged 84) Toronto, Ontario
- Weight: Welterweight

Boxing career
- Stance: Orthodox

Boxing record
- Total fights: 40
- Wins: 32
- Win by KO: 14
- Losses: 8

Sammy Luftspring (May 14, 1916 – September 27, 2000) was a Jewish Canadian boxer. A former Canadian Welterweight Champion and highly ranked in the Welterweight class during his career, Luftspring was forced to retire from the sport due to an eye injury. He was inducted into Canada's Sports Hall of Fame in 1985, and the Ontario Sports Hall of Fame in 1996.

== Early career ==
Luftspring was born in May 1916 to Jewish parents of Polish descent and raised in St. John's Ward, a low class residential area of Toronto that was home to both Jewish and Italian immigrants. His father attempted to make a living as a bootlegger prior to prohibition, and the family struggled to raise six children under difficult circumstances. Luftspring began his boxing career in 1932 out of Brunswick Talmud Torah, a local Toronto Jewish community and recreational centre. Throughout his career, he wore a Magen David on his trunks. Over the next four years, he fought 105 times (attaining a record of 100–5) and captured Golden Gloves Tournaments in various weight classes ranging from bantamweight to welterweight.

By 1933, he was the Ontario amateur lightweight champion and regarded as one of the best amateur boxing talents.

In 1933, he was involved in the infamous Toronto Christie Pits riot. A wild street brawl first broke out at Christie Pits Park following tensions that occurred during a series of amateur softball games between two rival teams. The riot continued for six hours, and eventually attracted 10,000 locals, mostly spectators. The initial antagonists were a group of young Jewish and Italian men on a local team who started a fight when a Gang unfurled a Swastika, a symbol that had been displayed the previous day and on other occasions by the local Swastika Club, a group of Canadian Nazi sympathizers.

== 1936 Berlin Olympics boycott ==
Luftspring in 1937

Luftspring was named to Canada's Olympic team for the 1936 Berlin Olympics. At the encouragement of his parents, he refused to attend the Games in protest over the poor treatment Jews were receiving in Nazi Germany. He made his views on the subject public in a letter to the Toronto Globe. In the letter, he protested that "the German government was treating its Jewish brothers and sisters worse than dogs". He even went as far as to say that "the German government would exterminate Jews if they had the opportunity".

Luftspring and another boxer, Norman "Baby" Yack, attempted to participate in an alternate event being hosted that summer, the People's Olympics in Barcelona, Spain. The Spanish Civil War broke out prior to the Games' opening ceremonies. The event caused the cancellation of the People's Olympics. By the time Luftspring found out about the cancellation, he had already reached Dieppe, France.

Luftspring, disappointed at not having a chance to compete, returned to Toronto.

== Professional career ==
Luftspring began to box professionally in the fall of 1936. A year later, he fought Gordon Wallace for the Canadian welterweight championship. He lost to Wallace in a 10-round decision at Toronto's Maple Leaf Gardens.

He married his wife Elsie in 1938 at Toronto's McCaul Street synagogue.

=== Canadian Welterweight Champion ===
In 1938, Luftspring knocked out Frankie Genovese before a Toronto crowd of 10,000 in the 13th of 15 rounds to win the Canadian welterweight championship. Genovese was down at least three times in the final rounds for counts of 9. The fight was his first in Canada under the management of French-American Al Weill, who had managed the exceptional welterweight Lou Ambers. Genovese and Luftspring's rivalry was extremely competitive and one of the dominant story lines of Toronto boxing in the late 1930s.

That same year, he was ranked as the third-best welterweight boxer in the world. He was subsequently offered a chance to fight world champion Henry Armstrong in 1940.

Luftspring lost to Greek American boxer Steve Makamos, a middleweight contender, on February 14, 1940, in a ten-round split decision in Toronto. Makamos led in the early fighting, and a late rally by Luftspring in the closing rounds was not enough to gain the decision.

In a fight at New York's Bronx Colliseum on May 27, 1940, against Steve Belloise, Luftspring received an eye injury in the fourth round from a looping right punch that unintentionally caught his left eye with the thumb of the glove. The medical diagnosis was a detached retina, an inoperable condition, that resulted in nearly complete loss of vision. The fight was intended to be a tune up for a potential championship bout against Armstrong. The injury forced Luftspring to quit boxing and ended his contention for the world welterweight title.

Details of his career record are unclear. Different reports have him winning 50 of either 55 or 56 pro bouts. More detailed records list him as 32–8 with 14 knockouts.

== Life after boxing ==
Luftspring struggled to establish himself immediately after boxing. He became a taxicab driver and then a representative for a liquor company.

He began refereeing on occasion at the end of his boxing career, and within five years finally established himself as a respected Toronto referee who would eventually oversee 2,000 bouts. Some of the prominent and memorable fights he refereed between 1941 and 1984 include:

- September 15, 1958 – The Canadian heavyweight title match between George Chuvalo and James J. Parker at Maple Leaf Gardens.
- October 1, 1965 – The WBA heavyweight title match between George Chuvalo and Ernie Terrell at Maple Leaf Gardens.
- January 27, 1970 – A bout between Humberto Trottman and Clyde Gray at Royal York Hotel in which an upset Trottman, thinking Luftspring was interfering with his style, took a swing at him. Luftspring responded with a bare-knuckle left hook off the side of Trottman's head, forcing Trottman's manager to race into the ring and intervene.

Nearing the end of his prolific refereeing career around 1981, he began work as a boxing judge though 1991, judging nearly 100 bouts.

Luftspring, along with three partners, Harry Eckler of the baseball hall of fame, Joe Krol of the football hall of fame and their friend Lou Cadsby, opened the Mercury Club in 1948, a dining establishment on Dundas Street, near Bay Street, in Toronto. It was a successful club, which featured popular performers such as Henny Youngman, Vic Damone and Tony Bennett. Luftspring helped to host and operate the club, which had its peak years in the 1950s and 1960s, while simultaneously working as a referee. He subsequently ran other nightclubs such as the Tropicana.

After a lengthy illness, Luftspring died at Toronto East General hospital on September 27, 2000. He was buried at the Interment Slipia Synagogue Section of Dawes Road Cemetery in Toronto.

== Career highlights ==
- 1933 – Ontario Amateur Lightweight Boxing Champion
- 1936 – Named to the Canadian Olympic Boxing Team (Elected not to compete)
- 1938 – Canadian Welterweight Boxing Champion
- 1985 – Inducted into Canada's Sports Hall of Fame

== Selected fights ==
4 Wins, 3 Losses
| Result | Opponent(s) | Date | Location | Duration | Notes |
| Win | Frankie Genovese | Jan 5, 1937 | Toronto | 10 Round TKO | |
| Win | Johnny Jadick | Feb 3, 1937 | Toronto | 8 Round UD | Former Jr. Welter Champ |
| Loss | Gordon Wallace | Apr 2, 1937 | Toronto | 10 Rounds | For Canad. Welter Title |
| Loss | Frankie Genovese | Apr 30, 1937 | Toronto | 10 Rounds | Non-title |
| Win | Frankie Genovese | Oct 3, 1938 | Toronto | 13 Round TKO | Won Canad. Welter Title |
| Win | Steve Makamos | Feb 19, 1940 | Toronto | 10 Rounds SD | |
| Loss | Steve Belloise | May 27, 1940 | Bronx, NY | 8 Rounds | Eye injury ended career |

== See also ==
- List of select Jewish boxers

== Autobiography ==
- Call Me Sammy – Sammy Luftspring with Brian Swarbrick, Prentice-Hall Canada Ltd., 1975—ISBN 0131126490
