= Gordon Wallace (boxer, born 1911) =

Canadian boxer (born 1911)

Personal information
- Born: Gordon Wallace; 14 July 1911 Stoughton, Saskatchewan, Canada
- Height: 5 ft 7 in (170 cm)
- Weight: Welterweight

Boxing career
- Reach: 72 in (183 cm) (Note: According to a contemporary report of his bout against Barney Ross, whose reach was listed as 67 inches (170 cm), Wallace held a five-inch reach advantage, suggesting a reach of 72 inches (183 cm).)

Boxing record
- Total fights: 120
- Wins: 65
- Win by KO: 14
- Losses: 28
- Draws: 27

Gordon Wallace (born 14 July 1911) was a Canadian professional boxer who competed from 1924 to 1940. He held the Canadian welterweight title twice, first from 1935 to 1937, during which he retained the title eight times, and again in 1938. In July 1935, The Pittsburgh Press described Wallace as "the most magnetic attraction" in the history of Vancouver, British Columbia. As of November 2026, Wallace is ranked by BoxRec as the 18th-greatest pound for pound Canadian boxer of all time.

== Boxing career ==
Fighting out of Vancouver, British Columbia, Canada, and under the management of boxing promoter Jack "Deacon" Allen, Wallace compiled a record of 26–9–21 in his first 56 professional bouts, before outpointing Bobby Pacho over eight rounds on 6 February 1934.

On 8 January 1935, Wallace captured the vacant Canadian welterweight title by knocking out Ron Headley in the eighth round. He made his first successful defense on 20 February, defeating Sonny Jones. Wallace next defended his title on 20 March against Tommy Bland in a 12-round bout. Wallace landed a powerful blow in the ninth round that caused swelling beneath Bland's left eye. He maintained the pressure for the remainder of the fight, ultimately winning by decision. On 8 May, Wallace outpointed former world super featherweight champion Tod Morgan over ten rounds. On 2 October, Wallace earned a unanimous decision victory over Frankie Genovese in the first of their six meetings, retaining his title. Wallace next faced future world middleweight champion Ceferino Garcia in three consecutive bouts, fighting him to a draw in their first meeting before losing the next two by decision.

On 11 March 1936, Wallace faced three-division world champion and reigning world welterweight champion Barney Ross in a non-title bout. Ross set a fast pace from the opening bell, relentlessly pursuing Wallace throughout the ten rounds. Wallace, however, rarely retreated, counterpunching effectively and repeatedly slowing Ross's attack with brilliant flurries of punches. Ross ultimately earned a close decision victory, with the referee and one judge scoring the bout in his favor, while the other judge ruled it a draw. The Vancouver Sun declared that Wallace had never fought a better fight, while veteran ringside observers described it as the finest bout they had ever witnessed in Vancouver. In his next fight, Wallace defeated Young Peter Jackson by unanimous decision. After defeating Mike Payan by unanimous decision on 5 May, Wallace faced him in an immediate rematch on 21 May, once again outpointing him over ten rounds. On 2 December, Wallace earned a unanimous decision victory over Henry Woods at Denman Auditorium in Vancouver.

On 9 February 1937, Wallace retained his title by defeating Johnny Blochlinger via technical knockout in the eighth round. He made another successful defense on 2 April, outpointing Sammy Luftspring over ten rounds. On 17 May, Wallace defended his title against Frankie Genovese in a rematch at Maple Leaf Gardens, losing the championship by a close decision after ten rounds. Wallace's manager disputed the result and unsuccessfully sought to have the decision overturned in court. In their third meeting on July 5, Wallace lost by split decision and was again outpointed in their fourth encounter. However, Wallace avenged those defeats in their fifth meeting on 1 January 1938, winning by split decision to regain the Canadian welterweight title. He subsequently lost the championship back to Genovese in their sixth and final meeting on 1 April.

After losing his first two bouts against Dick Demaray in mid-to-late 1938, Wallace fought him to a draw on 21 July 1939. In their fourth and final meeting, Wallace defeated Demaray after accepting the bout on short notice following the withdrawal of two previously scheduled opponents.

Wallace fought seven times in 1940, three of them against Jerry Hayes, including his last career fight on 24 June, all decision victories for Wallace.

Wallace retired from professional boxing in 1940 with a record of 65–28–27, including 14 victories by knockout, having never been knocked out himself. He was ranked among The Ring magazine's top ten welterweights from November 1935 to August 1936, peaking at No. 8.

== Professional boxing record ==
| 120 fights | 65 wins | 28 losses |
|---|---|---|
| By knockout | 14 | 0 |
| By decision | 51 | 28 |
| Draws | 27 | |

| No. | Result | Record | Opponent | Type | Round, time | Date | Location | Notes |
|---|---|---|---|---|---|---|---|---|
| 120 | Win | 65–28–27 | Jerry Hayes | PTS | 10 | 24 Jun 1940 | Dome Pavilion, Bismarck, North Dakota, U.S. | |
| 119 | Win | 64–28–27 | Henry Schaft | PTS | 6 | 15 Apr 1940 | Auditorium, Saint Paul, Minnesota, U.S. | |
| 118 | Draw | 63–28–27 | Solly Stark | PTS | 10 | 5 Apr 1940 | Minot, North Dakota, U.S. | |
| 117 | Win | 63–28–26 | Jerry Hayes | PTS | 6 | 29 Mar 1940 | Armory, Minneapolis, Minnesota, U.S. | |
| 116 | Loss | 62–28–26 | Sammy Frazer | PTS | 6 | 15 Mar 1940 | Armory, Minneapolis, Minnesota, U.S. | |
| 115 | Win | 62–27–26 | Pete Alcanter | PTS | 8 | 8 Mar 1940 | Armory, Minneapolis, Minnesota, U.S. | |
| 114 | Win | 61–27–26 | Jerry Hayes | PTS | 6 | 1 Mar 1940 | Armory, Minneapolis, Minnesota, U.S. | |
| 113 | Loss | 60–27–26 | Tiger Ray Cote | PTS | 10 | 21 Sep 1939 | Babcock Theater, Billings, Montana, U.S. | |
| 112 | Win | 60–26–26 | Midget Mexico | PTS | 8 | 12 Sep 1939 | Auditorium, Saint Paul, Minnesota, U.S. | |
| 111 | Win | 59–26–26 | Jimmy Collins | PTS | 8 | 21 Aug 1939 | Lexington Park, Saint Paul, Minnesota, U.S. | |
| 110 | Win | 58–26–26 | Dick Demaray | PTS | 8 | 2 Aug 1939 | Lexington Park, Saint Paul, Minnesota, U.S. | |
| 109 | Draw | 57–26–26 | Dick Demaray | PTS | 10 | 21 Jul 1939 | Athletic Park, Billings, Montana, U.S. | |
| 108 | Win | 57–26–25 | Tuffy McDonald | TKO | 7 | 14 Jul 1939 | Milk River, Alberta, Canada | |
| 107 | Loss | 56–26–25 | Dick Demaray | PTS | 10 | 18 Nov 1938 | Moose Jaw, Saskatchewan, Canada | |
| 106 | Draw | 56–25–25 | Young Tunney Lust | PTS | 10 | 4 Nov 1938 | Medicine Hat, Alberta, Canada | |
| 105 | Loss | 56–25–24 | Alvin Lewis | PTS | 10 | 5 Aug 1938 | Calgary, Alberta, Canada | |
| 104 | Loss | 56–24–24 | Dick Demaray | PTS | 12 | 30 Jun 1938 | Saskatoon, Saskatchewan, Canada | |
| 103 | Win | 56–23–24 | Al Traino | PTS | 6 | 3 Jun 1938 | Auditorium, Ottawa, Ontario, Canada | |
| 102 | Win | 55–23–24 | Eddie Dempsey | TKO | 3 | 20 May 1938 | Auditorium, Ottawa, Ontario, Canada | |
| 101 | Win | 54–23–24 | Frank Kamecki | PTS | 6 | 6 May 1938 | Auditorium, Ottawa, Ontario, Canada | |
| 100 | Loss | 53–23–24 | Sonny Jones | DQ | 6 | 25 Apr 1938 | Maple Leaf Gardens, Toronto, Ontario, Canada | |
| 99 | Loss | 53–22–24 | Frankie Genovese | PTS | 10 | 1 April 1938 | Toronto, Ontario, Canada | Lost Canadian welterweight title |
| 98 | Loss | 53–21–24 | Cocoa Kid | UD | 10 | 21 Feb 1938 | Valley Arena, Holyoke, Massachusetts, U.S. | |
| 97 | Win | 53–20–24 | Werther Arcelli | PTS | 10 | 7 Feb 1938 | Maple Leaf Gardens, Toronto, Ontario, Canada | |
| 96 | Loss | 52–20–24 | Frankie Blair | PTS | 6 | 4 Feb 1938 | Madison Square Garden, New York City, New York, U.S. | |
| 95 | Win | 52–19–24 | Frankie Genovese | SD | 12 | 1 Jan 1938 | Vancouver, British Columbia, Canada | Won Canadian welterweight title |
| 94 | Loss | 51–19–24 | Chuck Woods | SD | 8 | 28 Dec 1937 | Maple Leaf Gardens, Toronto, Ontario, Canada | |
| 93 | Loss | 51–18–24 | Eddie Carroll | UD | 10 | 2 Nov 1937 | Mutual Street Arena, Toronto, Ontario, Canada | |
| 92 | Loss | 51–17–24 | Frankie Genovese | PTS | 10 | 8 Sep 1937 | Maple Leaf Gardens, Toronto, Ontario, Canada | For Canadian welterweight title |
| 91 | Loss | 51–16–24 | George Salvadore | PTS | 10 | 16 Aug 1937 | Marigold Gardens Outdoor Arena, Chicago, Illinois, U.S. | |
| 90 | Win | 51–15–24 | Tommy Bland | SD | 12 | 11 Aug 1937 | Toronto, Ontario, Canada | |
| 89 | Loss | 50–15–24 | Frankie Genovese | SD | 10 | 5 Jul 1937 | Maple Leaf Gardens, Toronto, Ontario, Canada | For Canadian welterweight title |
| 88 | Loss | 50–14–24 | Frankie Genovese | UD | 10 | 17 May 1937 | Maple Leaf Gardens, Toronto, Ontario, Canada | Lost Canadian welterweight title |
| 87 | Win | 50–13–24 | Sammy Luftspring | PTS | 10 | 2 Apr 1937 | Maple Leaf Gardens, Toronto, Ontario, Canada | Retained Canadian welterweight title |
| 86 | Win | 49–13–24 | Johnny Blochlinger | TKO | 8 | 9 Feb 1937 | Victoria, British Columbia, Canada | Retained Canadian welterweight title |
| 85 | Win | 48–13–24 | Indian Billy Lee | PTS | 10 | 6 Jan 1937 | Denman Auditorium, Vancouver, British Columbia, Canada | |
| 84 | Win | 47–13–24 | Harry Dublinsky | KO | 5 | 16 Dec 1936 | Vancouver, British Columbia, Canada | |
| 83 | Win | 46–13–24 | Henry Woods | UD | 10 | 2 Dec 1936 | Denman Auditorium, Vancouver, British Columbia, Canada | |
| 82 | Win | 45–13–24 | Midnight Bell | UD | 10 | 11 Nov 1936 | Vancouver, British Columbia, Canada | |
| 81 | Win | 44–13–24 | Bob Wood | UD | 10 | 28 Oct 1936 | Powell River, British Columbia, Canada | |
| 80 | Loss | 43–13–24 | Midnight Bell | MD | 10 | 7 Oct 1936 | Denman Auditorium, Vancouver, British Columbia, Canada | |
| 79 | Draw | 43–12–24 | Midnight Bell | PTS | 10 | 19 Aug 1936 | Denman Auditorium, Vancouver, British Columbia, Canada | |
| 78 | Win | 43–12–23 | Sonny Jones | UD | 12 | 30 Jun 1936 | Vancouver, British Columbia, Canada | Retained Canadian welterweight title |
| 77 | Win | 42–12–23 | Bob Wood | PTS | 10 | 12 Jun 1936 | Powell River, British Columbia, Canada | |
| 76 | Win | 41–12–23 | Mike Payan | PTS | 10 | 21 May 1936 | Greenwich Coliseum, Tacoma, Washington, U.S. | |
| 75 | Win | 40–12–23 | Mike Payan | UD | 10 | 6 May 1936 | Arena, Vancouver, British Columbia, Canada | |
| 74 | Win | 39–12–23 | Young Peter Jackson | UD | 10 | 2 Apr 1936 | Denman Auditorium, Vancouver, British Columbia, Canada | |
| 73 | Loss | 38–12–23 | Barney Ross | MD | 10 | 11 Mar 1936 | Arena, Vancouver, British Columbia, Canada | |
| 72 | Loss | 38–11–23 | Ceferino Garcia | PTS | 10 | 7 Feb 1936 | Legion Stadium, Hollywood, California, U.S. | |
| 71 | Loss | 38–10–23 | Ceferino Garcia | MD | 12 | 20 Nov 1935 | Arena, Vancouver, British Columbia, Canada | |
| 70 | Draw | 38–9–23 | Ceferino Garcia | PTS | 10 | 23 Oct 1935 | Arena, Vancouver, British Columbia, Canada | |
| 69 | Win | 38–9–22 | Frankie Genovese | UD | 12 | 2 Oct 1935 | Arena, Vancouver, British Columbia, Canada | Retained Canadian welterweight title |
| 68 | Win | 37–9–22 | Eddie Carroll | PTS | 10 | 6 Sep 1935 | Auditorium, Ottawa, Ontario, Canada | Retained Canadian welterweight title |
| 67 | Win | 36–9–22 | Jimmy Best | PTS | 10 | 28 Jun 1935 | Denman Auditorium, Vancouver, British Columbia, Canada | |
| 66 | Win | 35–9–22 | Jimmy Best | PTS | 10 | 6 Jun 1935 | Ballard Ice Arena, Seattle, Washington, U.S. | |
| 65 | Win | 34–9–22 | Tod Morgan | PTS | 10 | 8 May 1935 | Denman Auditorium, Vancouver, British Columbia, Canada | |
| 64 | Draw | 33–9–22 | Sonny Jones | PTS | 12 | 23 Apr 1935 | Arena, Vancouver, British Columbia, Canada | Retained Canadian welterweight title |
| 63 | Win | 33–9–21 | Tommy Bland | PTS | 12 | 20 Mar 1935 | Arena, Vancouver, British Columbia, Canada | Retained Canadian welterweight title |
| 62 | Win | 32–9–21 | Sonny Jones | PTS | 12 | 20 Feb 1935 | Arena, Vancouver, British Columbia, Canada | Retained Canadian welterweight title |
| 61 | Win | 31–9–21 | Ron Headley | KO | 8 | 8 Jan 1935 | Denman Auditorium, Vancouver, British Columbia, Canada | Won vacant Canadian welterweight title |
| 60 | Win | 30–9–21 | Billy Townsend | KO | 12 | 11 Dec 1934 | Auditorium, Vancouver, British Columbia, Canada | |
| 59 | Win | 29–9–21 | Emil Lust | PTS | 10 | 19 Oct 1934 | Denman Auditorium, Vancouver, British Columbia, Canada | |
| 58 | Win | 28–9–21 | Eddie Kline | KO | 3 | 15 Aug 1934 | Vancouver, British Columbia, Canada | |
| 57 | Win | 27–9–21 | Bobby Pacho | PTS | 8 | 6 Feb 1934 | Civic Auditorium, Seattle, Washington, U.S. | |
| 56 | Win | 26–9–21 | Cecil Jordan | PTS | 4 | 2 Jan 1934 | Crystal Pool, Seattle, Washington, U.S. | |
| 55 | Win | 25–9–21 | Pete Eckstine | PTS | 8 | 29 Dec 1933 | Elks Club, Bremerton, Washington, U.S. | |
| 54 | Win | 24–9–21 | Tim Keist | RTD | 1 | 16 Dec 1933 | Tillicum Gymnasium, Victoria, British Columbia, Canada | |
| 53 | Draw | 23–9–21 | Alvin Lewis | PTS | 6 | 5 Dec 1933 | Crystal Pool, Seattle, Washington, U.S. | |
| 52 | Win | 23–9–20 | Pete Eckstine | KO | 5 | 7 Nov 1933 | Crystal Pool, Seattle, Washington, U.S. | |
| 51 | Win | 22–9–20 | Johnny Pasco | PTS | 10 | 2 Nov 1933 | Arena, White Center, Washington, U.S. | |
| 50 | Win | 21–9–20 | Justo Pasco | PTS | 8 | 18 Oct 1933 | Liberty Hall, Bellingham, Washington, U.S. | |
| 49 | Draw | 20–9–20 | Frisco McGale | PTS | 10 | 28 Sep 1933 | Arena, White Center, Washington, U.S. | |
| 48 | Draw | 20–9–19 | Frisco McGale | PTS | 10 | 7 Sep 1933 | Arena, White Center, Washington, U.S. | |
| 47 | Draw | 20–9–18 | Ted Gesch | PTS | 6 | 15 Jun 1933 | Arena, White Center, Washington, U.S. | |
| 46 | Draw | 20–9–17 | Johnny Spencer | PTS | 6 | 31 May 1933 | Labor Temple, Everett, Washington, U.S. | |
| 45 | Win | 20–9–16 | Kid McCoy | PTS | 4 | 7 Nov 1931 | Tillicum Gymnasium, Victoria, British Columbia, Canada | |
| 44 | Loss | 19–9–16 | Nels Ferguson | PTS | 4 | 1 Jun 1931 | Arena, Vancouver, British Columbia, Canada | |
| 43 | Win | 19–8–16 | Ralph Evans | PTS | 4 | 10 Feb 1931 | Auditorium, Vancouver, British Columbia, Canada | |
| 42 | Win | 18–8–16 | Jimmy Farrar | PTS | 4 | 29 Sep 1930 | Vancouver, British Columbia, Canada | |
| 41 | Draw | 17–8–16 | Jimmy Beck | PTS | 6 | 22 May 1930 | Greenwich Coliseum, Tacoma, Washington, U.S. | |
| 40 | Draw | 17–8–15 | Jimmy Beck | PTS | 6 | 7 May 1930 | Liberty Hall, Bellingham, Washington, U.S. | |
| 39 | Draw | 17–8–14 | Billy Murphy | PTS | 6 | 23 Apr 1930 | Liberty Hall, Bellingham, Washington, U.S. | |
| 38 | Draw | 17–8–13 | Eddie Herman | PTS | 4 | 19 Mar 1930 | Crystal Pool, Seattle, Washington, U.S. | |
| 37 | Draw | 17–8–12 | Eddie Thomas | PTS | 6 | 16 Jan 1930 | Greenwich Coliseum, Tacoma, Washington, U.S. | |
| 36 | Draw | 17–8–11 | Joe Townsend | PTS | 4 | 9 Jan 1930 | Denman Auditorium, Vancouver, British Columbia, Canada | |
| 35 | Win | 17–8–10 | Jack Sweeney | DQ | 6 | 1 Jan 1930 | Liberty Hall, Bellingham, Washington, U.S. | |
| 34 | Win | 16–8–10 | Eddie Morgan | KO | 3 | 1 Nov 1929 | Arena, Vancouver, British Columbia, Canada | |
| 33 | Win | 15–8–10 | Jack Nash | KO | 3 | 19 Jul 1929 | Skating Rink, Centralia, Washington, U.S. | |
| 32 | Loss | 14–8–10 | Tommy Fielding | PTS | 6 | 28 Jun 1929 | Vancouver, British Columbia, Canada | |
| 31 | Win | 14–7–10 | Chris Langdon | PTS | 6 | 30 May 1929 | Vancouver, British Columbia, Canada | |
| 30 | Win | 13–7–10 | Alec Webber | PTS | 6 | 9 May 1929 | Greenwich Coliseum, Tacoma, Washington, U.S. | |
| 29 | Loss | 12–7–10 | Benny Wendell | PTS | 4 | 17 Apr 1929 | Liberty Hall, Bellingham, Washington, U.S. | |
| 28 | Loss | 12–6–10 | Earle Morrison | PTS | 4 | 9 Apr 1929 | Armory, Portland, Oregon, U.S. | |
| 27 | Draw | 12–5–10 | Jimmy Britt | PTS | 6 | 3 Apr 1929 | Liberty Hall, Bellingham, Washington, U.S. | |
| 26 | Win | 12–5–9 | Alec Webber | PTS | 4 | 12 Mar 1929 | Armory, Portland, Oregon, U.S. | |
| 25 | Win | 11–5–9 | Jimmy Warfield | PTS | 4 | 21 Feb 1929 | Auditorium, Vancouver, British Columbia, Canada | |
| 24 | Win | 10–5–9 | Benny Wendell | PTS | 4 | 18 Jan 1929 | Auditorium, Vancouver, British Columbia, Canada | |
| 23 | Win | 9–5–9 | Benny Wendell | PTS | 4 | 14 Dec 1928 | Auditorium, Vancouver, British Columbia, Canada | |
| 22 | Loss | 8–5–9 | Johnny Casebeer | PTS | 6 | 20 Nov 1928 | Crystal Pool, Seattle, Washington, U.S. | |
| 21 | Win | 8–4–9 | Denny Martin | PTS | 4 | 16 Nov 1928 | Auditorium, Vancouver, British Columbia, Canada | |
| 20 | Draw | 7–4–9 | Benny Wendell | PTS | 4 | 14 Nov 1928 | Liberty Hall, Bellingham, Washington, U.S. | |
| 19 | Win | 7–4–8 | Art McKillop | KO | 1 | 5 Nov 1928 | Vancouver, British Columbia, Canada | |
| 18 | Draw | 6–4–8 | Dave Lewis | MD | 4 | 3 Nov 1928 | Victoria, British Columbia, Canada | |
| 17 | Loss | 6–4–7 | Leo Felix | DQ | 1 | 29 Sep 1928 | Tillicum Gymnasium, Victoria, British Columbia, Canada | |
| 16 | Draw | 6–3–7 | Dave Lewis | PTS | 4 | 22 Sep 1928 | Sons of Canada Hall, Victoria, British Columbia, Canada | |
| 15 | Win | 6–3–6 | Kid Sullivan | KO | 1 | 3 Sep 1928 | Arena, Vancouver, British Columbia, Canada | |
| 14 | Draw | 5–3–6 | Eddie Thomas | PTS | 4 | 8 Dec 1926 | Liberty Hall, Bellingham, Washington, U.S. | |
| 13 | Draw | 5–3–5 | Tommy Fielding | PTS | 4 | 15 Jul 1926 | Athletic Park, Vancouver, British Columbia, Canada | |
| 12 | Loss | 5–3–4 | Mike Carr | PTS | 4 | 9 Jun 1926 | Broadway Auditorium, Everett, Washington, U.S. | |
| 11 | Draw | 5–2–4 | Sailor Willie Gordon | PTS | ? | 16 Apr 1926 | Vancouver, British Columbia, Canada | |
| 10 | Loss | 5–2–3 | Leslie Wildcat Carter | PTS | 6 | 17 Mar 1926 | Broadway Auditorium, Everett, Washington, U.S. | |
| 9 | Draw | 5–1–3 | Charlie O'Leary | PTS | ? | 10 Feb 1926 | Bellingham, Washington, U.S. | |
| 8 | Win | 5–1–2 | Jimmy Ellis | KO | 2 | 27 Jan 1926 | Liberty Hall, Bellingham, Washington, U.S. | |
| 7 | Win | 4–1–2 | Danny Curtis | PTS | 4 | 19 Jan 1926 | Athletic Hall, Everson, Washington, U.S. | |
| 6 | Win | 3–1–2 | Dick Butler | PTS | ? | 15 Jan 1926 | Everett, Washington, U.S. | |
| 5 | Loss | 2–1–2 | Frankie Green | PTS | 3 | 4 Dec 1925 | Arena A.C., Everett, Washington, U.S. | |
| 4 | Win | 2–0–2 | Danny Pascoe | PTS | 4 | 2 Dec 1925 | Avenue Theatre, Vancouver, British Columbia, Canada | |
| 3 | Draw | 1–0–2 | Orville Erickson | PTS | ? | 20 Mar 1925 | Vancouver, British Columbia, Canada | |
| 2 | Win | 1–0–1 | Orville Erickson | PTS | 4 | 20 Dec 1924 | Liberty Hall, Bellingham, Washington, U.S. | |
| 1 | Draw | 0–0–1 | Battling Hoyer | PTS | 4 | 22 Oct 1924 | Liberty Hall, Bellingham, Washington, U.S. | |

== See also ==
- List of male boxers

== Notes and references ==
=== References ===
Achievements
| Vacant Title last held by Tommy Bland | Canadian welterweight champion 8 January 1935 – 17 May 1937 | Succeeded by Frankie Genovese |
| Preceded by Frankie Genovese | Canadian welterweight champion 1 January 1938 – 1 April 1938 | Succeeded by Frankie Genovese |
