= Olympic Theater =

Olympic Theater or Olympic Theatre may refer to:

- Comedy Theatre, Melbourne, Australia, formerly Coppin's Olympic Theatre
- Olympic Theater, Philadelphia, Pennsylvania, formerly National Hall
- Olympic Theatre (London), England
- Olympic Theatre (Los Angeles), United States
- Olympic Theatre (New York City), United States
- Teatro Olimpico, Venice, Italy
- Theatre Olympics, a non-profit organization
- Walnut Street Theatre, Philadelphia, Pennsylvania, formerly The Olympic

== See also ==
- Olympia Theatre (disambiguation)
- Olympic Stadium (disambiguation)
