= Henry Woods (boxer) =

American boxer (1914–1990)

Personal information
- Nickname: Yakima's Ghost of Joe Gans
- Born: Henry Irving Woods; August 16, 1914 Yakima, Washington, U.S.
- Died: January 30, 1990 (aged 75) Yakima, Washington, U.S.
- Height: 5 ft 7 in (170 cm)
- Weight: Lightweight; Light welterweight Welterweight

Boxing career
- Reach: 69 in (175 cm)
- Stance: Orthodox

Boxing record
- Total fights: 99
- Wins: 82
- Win by KO: 37
- Losses: 9
- Draws: 8

Henry Irving Woods (August 16, 1914 – January 30, 1990) was an American professional boxer who competed from 1930 to 1942. He became the inaugural Washington State lightweight champion in 1932, holding the title until 1935, and later held the California State Athletic Commission welterweight title until 1939. Woods also challenged for the world light welterweight title in 1935.

== Early life ==
Woods was born on August 16, 1914, in Yakima, Washington, to John and Della Woods, both charter members of Bethel African Methodist Episcopal Church, where his mother served as organist.

== Boxing career ==
Woods was introduced to boxing by his grandfather, Jasper P. Evans, a Civil War veteran, and later began training at the Yakima YMCA. In 1927, at the age of 12, he had his first public bout at what is now State Fair Park, fighting a larger opponent to a draw.

Woods began his professional career a few years later under promoter Art Milbrandt and quickly established himself as a rising contender, going undefeated in his first 52 bouts. At age 19, he made history on October 27, 1933, by defeating Albie Davies to become Washington State's first lightweight champion, before suffering his first professional loss to Cecil Payne on January 30, 1934.

Woods retained his state lightweight title against Lloyd Smith on October 9, 1934, scoring knockdowns in the fifth and ninth rounds en route to a decisive victory. He successfully defended his title again on December 11, defeating Jimmy McLeod for the second time in just over six months.

On April 9, 1935, Woods challenged three-division world champion Barney Ross for the world light welterweight title, losing by unanimous decision.

After two previous losses to Cecil Payne had cost him an opportunity to break into the New York State Athletic Commission's top ten lightweight rankings, Woods faced Payne for a third time on October 22, 1935. Woods used his jab effectively in the later rounds to earn enough points for a draw.

By 1939, Woods held the California State Athletic Commission welterweight title, successfully defending it against Jimmy Garrison on May 23. In his next bout on June 6, he lost the title to Jackie Wilson, who caught Woods with a right cross as he rushed in and knocked him out in the sixth round.

Woods retired in 1942 with a professional record of 82–9–8, including 37 victories by knockout.

== Later life and death ==
Following his retirement from boxing, Woods worked as a shipbuilder in Tacoma, Washington before returning to Yakima upon his retirement in 1977. He also wrote a booklet entitled The Fundamentals of Scientific Boxing, intended to help others better understand and perfect the skills of boxing.

Woods died of heart failure at a Yakima hospital on January 30, 1990, at the age of 75.

== Professional boxing record ==
99 fights	82 wins	9 losses
By knockout	37	2
By decision	45	7
Draws	8	

No.	Result	Record	Opponent	Type	Round, time	Date	Location	Notes
99	Loss	82–9–8	Juan Zurita	PTS	10	Aug 19, 1942	Auditorium, Oakland, California, U.S.	
98	Draw	82–8–8	Eddie Bello	PTS	6	Jul 20, 1942	Memorial Auditorium, Sacramento, California, U.S.	
97	Win	82–8–7	Carlos Miranda	SD	10	Jul 19, 1940	Butte High Stadium, Butte, Montana, U.S.	
96	Win	81–8–7	Chief Evening Thunder	PTS	10	Jun 25, 1940	Fox Theater, Butte, Montana, U.S.	
95	Win	80–8–7	Johnny Fasano	PTS	8	Feb 27, 1940	Civic Auditorium, Seattle, Washington, U.S.	
94	Loss	79–8–7	Jimmy Garrison	TKO	5 (10)	Nov 21, 1939	Olympic Auditorium, Los Angeles, California, U.S.	
93	Win	79–7–7	Joe Ybarra	PTS	6	Nov 8, 1939	Auditorium, Oakland, California, U.S.	
92	Loss	78–7–7	Johnny Fasano	PTS	10	Jun 19, 1939	National Hall, San Francisco, California, U.S.	
91	Loss	78–6–7	California Jackie Wilson	KO	6 (10)	Jun 6, 1939	Olympic Auditorium, Los Angeles, California, U.S.	Lost California State Athletic Commission welterweight title
90	Win	78–5–7	Jimmy Garrison	PTS	10	May 23, 1939	Olympic Auditorium, Los Angeles, California, U.S.	Retained California State Athletic Commission welterweight title (Note: Title win date unknown.)
89	Draw	77–5–7	Louis Flyer	PTS	10	Mar 7, 1939	Olympic Auditorium, Los Angeles, California, U.S.	
88	Win	77–5–6	Battling Ross	KO	2 (10)	Feb 16, 1939	Arena, El Cerrito, California, U.S.	
87	Loss	76–5–6	Aaron Wade	PTS	10	Feb 10, 1939	Dreamland Auditorium, San Francisco, California, U.S.	
86	Win	76–4–6	Joe Ybarra	PTS	6	Jan 13, 1939	Arena, El Cerrito, California, U.S.	
85	Win	75–4–6	Everett Simington	KO	4 (10)	Dec 14, 1938	Memorial Auditorium, Sacramento, California, U.S.	
84	Win	74–4–6	Eddie Stanley	RTD	5 (8)	Nov 14, 1938	National Hall, San Francisco, California, U.S.	
83	Win	73–4–6	Joe Ybarra	TKO	4 (6)	Oct 6, 1938	Modesto Junior College Stadium, Modesto, California, U.S.	
82	Win	72–4–6	Carlos Miranda	PTS	10	Jun 7, 1938	Civic Auditorium, Stockton, California, U.S.	
81	Win	71–4–6	Joe Ybarra	PTS	10	Jun 1, 1938	Auditorium, Oakland, California, U.S.	
80	Win	70–4–6	Frankie Santos	TKO	6 (10)	May 10, 1938	Memorial Auditorium, Sacramento, California, U.S.	
79	Win	69–4–6	Chico Romo	PTS	10	Apr 26, 1938	Civic Auditorium, Stockton, California, U.S.	
78	Win	68–4–6	Lester Marston	PTS	6	Apr 1, 1938	L-st Arena, Sacramento, California, U.S.	
77	Win	67–4–6	Johnny Fasano	PTS	10	Mar 3, 1938	Dreamland Auditorium, San Francisco, California, U.S.	
76	Win	66–4–6	Johnny Fasano	PTS	10	Jan 7, 1938	Dreamland Auditorium, San Francisco, California, U.S.	
75	Win	65–4–6	Biff Highsmith	KO	3 (10)	Dec 22, 1936	Elks Lodge, Ellensburg, Washington, U.S.	
74	Loss	64–4–6	Gordon Wallace	UD	10	Dec 2, 1936	Denman Auditorium, Vancouver, British Columbia, Canada	
73	Draw	64–3–6	Cecil Payne	PTS	10	Mar 3, 1936	Crystal Pool, Seattle, Washington, U.S.	
72	Draw	64–3–5	Cecil Payne	MD	10	Oct 22, 1935	Crystal Pool, Seattle, Washington, U.S.	
71	Win	64–3–4	Battling Gizzy	PTS	10	Oct 3, 1935	Auditorium, Portland, Oregon, U.S.	
70	Win	63–3–4	Battling Gizzy	PTS	8	Sep 17, 1935	Civic Ice Arena, Seattle, Washington, U.S.	
69	Win	62–3–4	Frankie Monroe	PTS	10	Aug 30, 1935	American Legion Hall, Olympia, Washington, U.S.	Won Pacific Northwest lightweight title
68	Win	61–3–4	Abie Israel	PTS	10	May 28, 1935	Civic Ice Arena, Seattle, Washington, U.S.	Retained USA Washington State lightweight title
67	Loss	60–3–4	Barney Ross	UD	12	Apr 9, 1935	Civic Auditorium, Seattle, Washington, U.S.	For world light welterweight title
66	Win	60–2–4	Mike Stankovich	MD	8	Jan 29, 1935	Crystal Pool, Seattle, Washington, U.S.	
65	Win	59–2–4	Jimmy McLeod	PTS	10	Dec 11, 1934	Crystal Pool, Seattle, Washington, U.S.	Retained USA Washington State lightweight title
64	Win	58–2–4	Emil Cody	PTS	10	Nov 15, 1934	Gonzaga Gymnasium, Spokane, Washington, U.S.	
63	Win	57–2–4	Teddy Yocson	KO	3 (10)	Nov 9, 1934	Armory, Yakima, Washington, U.S.	
62	Win	56–2–4	Sonny Jones	PTS	10	Oct 23, 1934	Crystal Pool, Seattle, Washington, U.S.	
61	Win	55–2–4	Lloyd Smith	PTS	10	Oct 9, 1934	Crystal Pool, Seattle, Washington, U.S.	Retained USA Washington State lightweight title
60	Win	54–2–4	Lloyd Smith	PTS	8	Sep 25, 1934	Crystal Pool, Seattle, Washington, U.S.	
59	Win	53–2–4	Davey Abad	PTS	10	Aug 3, 1934	Armory, Yakima, Washington, U.S.	
58	Win	52–2–4	Davey Abad	UD	10	Jul 4, 1934	Fairgrounds, Yakima, Washington, U.S.	
57	Win	51–2–4	Johnny Lamar	KO	3 (10)	Jun 12, 1934	Civic Ice Arena, Seattle, Washington, U.S.	
56	Win	50–2–4	Jimmy McLeod	PTS	8	May 31, 1934	Greenwich Coliseum, Tacoma, Washington, U.S.	Retained USA Washington State lightweight title; Both fighters came in overweight
55	Win	49–2–4	Jackie Red Stephens	KO	3 (8)	Apr 24, 1934	Civic Ice Arena, Seattle, Washington, U.S.	
54	Loss	48–2–4	Cecil Payne	PTS	10	Feb 13, 1934	Civic Auditorium, Seattle, Washington, U.S.	
53	Loss	48–1–4	Cecil Payne	UD	10	Jan 30, 1934	Crystal Pool, Seattle, Washington, U.S.	
52	Win	48–0–4	Kid Moro	PTS	8	Jan 16, 1934	Crystal Pool, Seattle, Washington, U.S.	
51	Win	47–0–4	Charlie Miller	PTS	8	Dec 19, 1933	Crystal Pool, Seattle, Washington, U.S.	
50	Win	46–0–4	Hubert Kid Dennis	PTS	8	Nov 21, 1933	Crystal Pool, Seattle, Washington, U.S.	
49	Win	45–0–4	Albie Davies	PTS	10	Oct 27, 1933	Capitol Theatre, Yakima, Washington, U.S.	Reportedly won inaugural USA Washington State lightweight title
48	Win	44–0–4	Joe Guerrero	PTS	10	Oct 17, 1933	Crystal Pool, Seattle, Washington, U.S.	
47	Win	43–0–4	Jimmy Alvarado	TKO	8 (10)	Sep 19, 1933	Civic Ice Arena, Seattle, Washington, U.S.	
46	Win	42–0–4	Carl Johnson	TKO	7 (10)	Sep 3, 1933	Rodeo Grounds, Ellensburg, Washington, U.S.	
45	Win	41–0–4	Lupe Castro	PTS	10	Jul 11, 1933	Civic Ice Arena, Seattle, Washington, U.S.	
44	Win	40–0–4	Don Fraser	PTS	6	Jun 20, 1933	Civic Ice Arena, Seattle, Washington, U.S.	
43	Win	39–0–4	Joe Ponce	KO	4 (6)	May 2, 1933	Civic Ice Arena, Seattle, Washington, U.S.	
42	Win	38–0–4	Stanley Krannenberg	PTS	6	Apr 18, 1933	Civic Ice Arena, Seattle, Washington, U.S.	
41	Win	37–0–4	Rita Punay	PTS	6	Mar 28, 1933	Civic Ice Arena, Seattle, Washington, U.S.	
40	Win	36–0–4	Baby Sal Sorio	KO	1 (6)	Mar 7, 1933	Crystal Pool, Seattle, Washington, U.S.	
39	Draw	35–0–4	Tod Morgan	MD	6	Dec 6, 1932	Crystal Pool, Seattle, Washington, U.S.	
38	Win	35–0–3	Ben Garvey	TKO	2 (6)	Nov 2, 1932	Crystal Pool, Seattle, Washington, U.S.	
37	Win	34–0–3	Sailor Joe Noto	KO	3 (6)	Oct 26, 1932	Crystal Pool, Seattle, Washington, U.S.	
36	Win	33–0–3	Roy Ockley	KO	1 (6)	Oct 12, 1932	Crystal Pool, Seattle, Washington, U.S.	
35	Win	32–0–3	Frankie Holland	KO	1 (6)	Sep 16, 1932	Club Lido, Yakima, Washington, U.S.	
34	Win	31–0–3	Eddie Ivory	KO	1 (6)	Aug 26, 1932	Civic Ice Arena, Seattle, Washington, U.S.	
33	Win	30–0–3	Benny Pelz	PTS	6	Aug 3, 1932	Civic Ice Arena, Seattle, Washington, U.S.	
32	Win	29–0–3	Johnny Hawkes	KO	3 (6)	Jul 27, 1932	Civic Ice Arena, Seattle, Washington, U.S.	
31	Win	28–0–3	Petie Miller	PTS	6	Jun 23, 1932	Greenwich Coliseum, Tacoma, Washington, U.S.	
30	Draw	27–0–3	Davey Jones	PTS	6	Jun 10, 1932	Fairgrounds, Yakima, Washington, U.S.	
29	Win	27–0–2	Albie Davies	PTS	6	May 13, 1932	Eagles Hall, Yakima, Washington, U.S.	Won Pacific Northwest lightweight title; Claimed Western Canada lightweight title
28	Win	26–0–2	Pastor Calope	KO	6 (6)	Apr 7, 1932	Greenwich Coliseum, Tacoma, Washington, U.S.	
27	Win	25–0–2	Petie Miller	PTS	6	Mar 18, 1932	Eagles Hall, Yakima, Washington, U.S.	
26	Win	24–0–2	Davey Jones	UD	6	Feb 26, 1932	Eagles Hall, Yakima, Washington, U.S.	
25	Win	23–0–2	Johnny Leonard	PTS	6	Feb 12, 1932	Eagles Hall, Yakima, Washington, U.S.	
24	Win	22–0–2	Jackie Kress	PTS	6	Jan 14, 1932	Eagles Hall, Yakima, Washington, U.S.	
23	Win	21–0–2	Frank Mangabot	TKO	4 (6)	Jan 7, 1932	Eagles Hall, Yakima, Washington, U.S.	
22	Win	20–0–2	Shuku Hashimoto	TKO	3 (4)	Dec 17, 1931	L-st Arena, Sacramento, California, U.S.	
21	Win	19–0–2	Maurice Barnes	TKO	3 (4)	Dec 3, 1931	Memorial Auditorium, Sacramento, California, U.S.	
20	Win	18–0–2	George Carpinson	KO	1 (4)	Nov 27, 1931	Memorial Auditorium, Sacramento, California, U.S.	
19	Win	17–0–2	Danny Lenzi	KO	1 (4)	Nov 12, 1931	L-st Arena, Sacramento, California, U.S.	
18	Win	16–0–2	Frankie Neil	TKO	4 (6)	Oct 23, 1931	Eagles Hall, Yakima, Washington, U.S.	
17	Win	15–0–2	Roy Goodman	PTS	6	Aug 18, 1931	Civic Ice Arena, Seattle, Washington, U.S.	
16	Win	14–0–2	Bud Henry	PTS	8	Jul 22, 1931	Elks Lodge, Ellensburg, Washington, U.S.	
15	Win	13–0–2	Bus Gove	KO	2 (4)	Jul 15, 1931	Civic Ice Arena, Seattle, Washington, U.S.	
14	Win	12–0–2	Roy Madden	KO	1 (6)	Mar 13, 1931	Crystal Pool, Seattle, Washington, U.S.	
13	Win	11–0–2	Chuck Carnera	PTS	4	Mar 4, 1931	Crystal Pool, Seattle, Washington, U.S.	
12	Win	10–0–2	Honeyboy Edwards	TKO	3 (4)	Feb 27, 1931	Eagles Hall, Yakima, Washington, U.S.	
11	Draw	9–0–2	Chuck Carnera	PTS	6	Feb 19, 1931	Eagles Hall, Yakima, Washington, U.S.	
10	Draw	9–0–1	Bud Henry	PTS	4	Feb 5, 1931	Eagles Hall, Yakima, Washington, U.S.	
9	Win	9–0	Young Riley	KO	2 (4)	Jan 13, 1931	Sports Palace, Yakima, Washington, U.S.	
8	Win	8–0	Bud Doyle	KO	1 (4)	Jan 1, 1931	Knights of Columbus Gym, Yakima, Washington, U.S.	
7	Win	7–0	Young Ray	RTD	2 (4)	Dec 26, 1930	Sports Palace, Yakima, Washington, U.S.	
6	Win	6–0	Young Ray	KO	1 (4)	Dec 19, 1930	Sports Palace, Yakima, Washington, U.S.	
5	Win	5–0	Young Doc Snell	KO	3 (4)	Dec 3, 1930	Sports Palace, Yakima, Washington, U.S.	
4	Win	4–0	Cecil Collins	PTS	4	Nov 19, 1930	Sports Palace, Yakima, Washington, U.S.	
3	Win	3–0	Battling Nelson	KO	4 (4)	Nov 14, 1930	Sports Palace, Yakima, Washington, U.S.	
2	Win	2–0	Frenchy Ryan	KO	1 (4)	Oct 24, 1930	Sports Palace, Yakima, Washington, U.S.	
1	Win	1–0	Chuck Flickenger	TKO	1 (4)	Oct 10, 1930	Sports Palace, Yakima, Washington, U.S.	

== See also ==
- List of male boxers
