= Barney Ross =

American boxer (1909–1967)

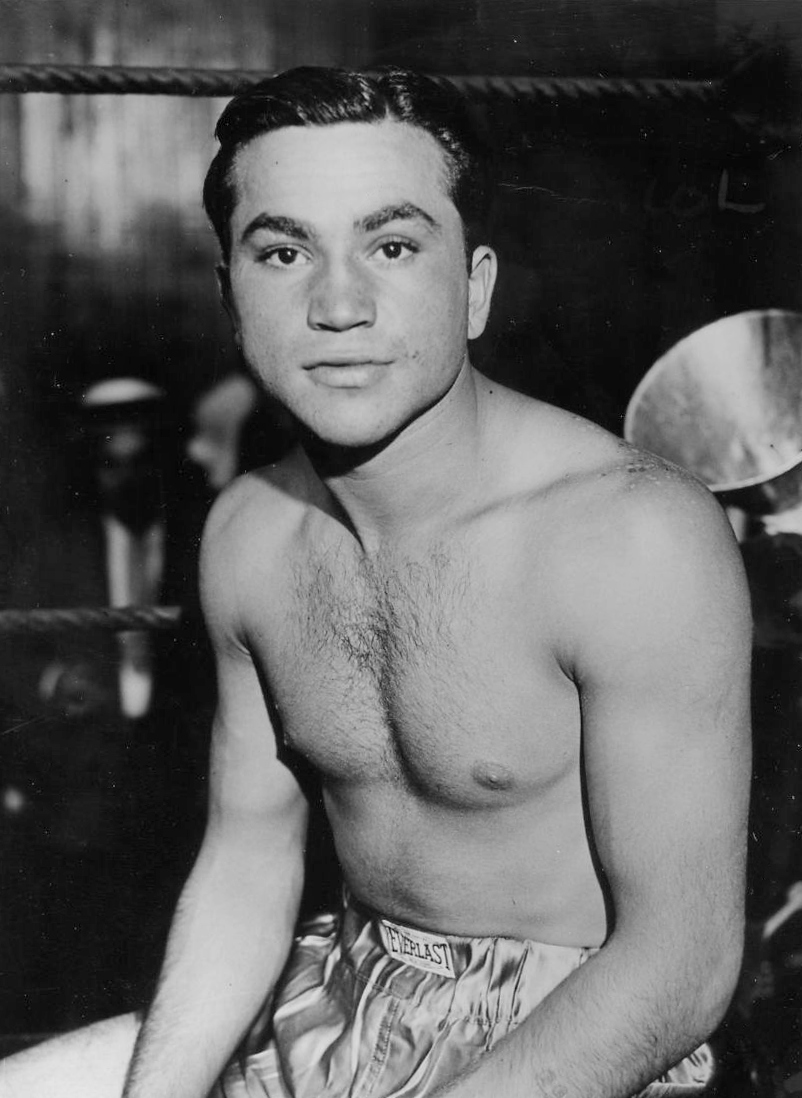
- Ross in 1934

Personal information
- Nickname: The Pride of the Ghetto
- Born: Dov-Ber David Rosofsky (Note: Also known as Barnet or Bernard; last name also commonly spelled Rasofsky.); December 23, 1909 New York City, U.S.
- Died: January 18, 1967 (aged 57) Chicago, Illinois, U.S.
- Height: 5 ft 7 in (1.70 m)
- Weight: Lightweight; Light Welterweight; Welterweight

Boxing career
- Reach: 67 in (170 cm)
- Stance: Orthodox

Boxing record
- Total fights: 81
- Wins: 74
- Win by KO: 22
- Losses: 4
- Draws: 3
- Military career
- Allegiance: United States
- Branch: United States Marine Corps
- Service years: 1942–1944
- Rank: Sergeant
- Units: B Company,1st Battalion 8th Marines
- Conflicts: World War II; Battle of Guadalcanal
- Awards: Silver Star; Purple Heart; Presidential Unit Citation; American Campaign Medal; Asiatic–Pacific Campaign Medal; World War II Victory Medal
Medal record
Men's amateur boxing
Intercity Golden Gloves
Gold medal – first place	1929 New York City	Featherweight
Chicago Golden Gloves
Gold medal – first place	1929 Chicago	Featherweight

Barney Ross (born Dov-Ber "Beryl" David Rosofsky; December 23, 1909 – January 18, 1967) was an American professional boxer and decorated veteran of World War II. Ross held world championships in three weight divisions from lightweight to welterweight between 1933 and 1938. He was inducted into the International Boxing Hall of Fame as part of its inaugural class in 1990. In November 2022, BoxRec ranked Ross as the 18th-greatest pound for pound boxer of all time. In his time, he was known as the Pride of the Ghetto.

Initially known locally as a brawler, Ross joined a local gang as a teenager, running errands with Jack Ruby (who would later become world-famous for murdering Lee Harvey Oswald) for mobster Al Capone.

Ross later rose to prominence after turning professional in boxing, becoming only the third fighter in history to capture world titles in three weight divisions, the first in the "Queensberry Rules era" to win championships in two weight classes simultaneously, and is considered to be the first simultaneous three-division world champion. (Note: Henry Armstrong is widely considered to be the first simultaneous three-division champion.) He was named The Ring magazine Fighter of the Year in 1934 (Note: Shared with Tony Canzoneri.) and 1935, and received the Edward J. Neil Trophy from the Boxing Writers Association in 1942. In his 81-fight professional career, Ross was never knocked out.

Following his boxing career, Ross joined the United States Marine Corps during World War II. While wounded during a night patrol, Ross single-handedly held off a Japanese attack, killing 22 soldiers and saving a fellow Marine. For his bravery, Ross was awarded a Silver Star, Purple Heart, and a Presidential Unit Citation, among others.

== Early life ==
Dov-Ber (or Beryl) Rosofsky was born on December 23, 1909, on New York City's Lower East Side to Isidore "Itchik" Rosofsky and Sarah Epstein Rosofsky, whose family had arrived in New York in 1903. His father was a Talmudic scholar who had emigrated from his native Brest-Litovsk after barely surviving a pogrom. In 1911, the family moved to Chicago, where Isidore became a rabbi and the owner of a small vegetable shop in the city's Maxwell Street neighborhood, a vibrant Jewish ghetto often compared with New York's Lower East Side of the 1920s and '30s.

Ross was raised with the expectation that he would follow in his father's footsteps, but instead gravitated toward the street life of his Chicago neighborhood. "'Let the goyim be the fighters,'" Ross later recalled being told by his father. "'The trombeniks, the murderers—we are the scholars.'" His life took a dramatic turn on December 13, 1923, when his father was shot while resisting a robbery at his small grocery store. Ross rushed into the store and found his father lying on the floor with a gunshot wound to the chest.

Following her husband's death, Ross's mother Sarah suffered a nervous breakdown and was hospitalized, before moving to Colchester, Connecticut, to live with relatives. As the family's finances dwindled, their store was sold, and Ross's younger siblings—Ida, Sam and George—were placed in an orphanage, while he and his older brother Morrie went to live with a cousin. With his oldest brother Benny, an accountant, unable to keep up with the family's expenses, Ross dropped out of James Medill High School and began working to help support the family.

As recounted in Barney Ross: The Life of a Jewish Fighter, by Ross biographer Douglas Century, in the wake of the tragedy, Dov became vindictive towards everything and turned his back on the orthodox religion of his father. He began running around with local toughs (including another wayward Jewish ghetto kid, the future Jack Ruby), developing into a street brawler, thief and money runner; he was even employed by Al Capone. Ross's goal was to earn enough money to buy a home so that he could reunite his family.

== Boxing career ==
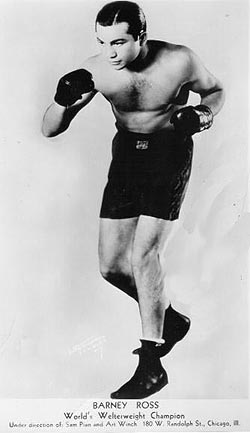
Ross in a promotional portrait

=== Amateur career ===
To conceal his boxing from his mother, Rosofsky began fighting under the name "Barney Ross." During his development as an amateur boxer, Ross received training from former lightweight contender Packey McFarland. From 1928 to 1929, Ross won approximately 100 amateur bouts while losing only once. He would pawn awards he received for his victories, such as watches, and set the money aside for his family. Al Capone occasionally bought every seat for Ross's early amateur fights at Chicago's Kit Howard Gymnasium and gave the tickets away to his supporters.

In February 1929, Ross won the Chicago Golden Gloves featherweight title, defeating Mike Pallardi, Benny Goldblatt, Art Donovan, and Jackie Davis, the latter in the final, whom Ross would go on to defeat twice more as a professional. The following month, Ross traveled to New York for the Intercity Golden Gloves, where he faced Al Santora. After the bout was scored a draw through three rounds, Ross won a tie-breaking fourth round to earn the decision. He would later become the first Golden Gloves champion to ever win a world championship.

In May 1929, Ross won the featherweight title at Paddy Harmon's international amateur boxing tournament, defeating Harold Stewart, Art Primrose, and Stanley Knopek.

=== Professional career ===
==== Background ====
At a time—the late 1920s and '30s—when Nazi leader Adolf Hitler was using propaganda to spread his virulently anti-Jewish philosophy, Ross was seen by American Jews as one of their greatest advocates. He represented the concept of Jews finally fighting back. Idolized and respected by all Americans, Ross showed that Jews could thrive in their new country. He made his stand against Hitler and Nazi Germany a public one. He knew that by winning boxing matches, he was displaying a new kind of strength for Jews. He also understood that Americans loved their sports heroes and if Jews wanted to be embraced in the U.S. they would have to assume such places in society.

For several years, Ross had lost faith in religion, but by 1933 was openly proud of his Jewish identity, insisting that he remained religious and wearing "tzitzit" to prove it. He also refused to train or fight on Jewish holidays and regularly attended prayer services. As his prominence grew, Ross embraced his role as a leader of his people.

He was initially managed by Willis "Gig" Rooney in 1929 before Sam Pian and Art Winch took over his management for the remainder of his career. He was trained by Ray Arcel and also worked with trainer and cutman Whitey Bimstein. Ross also attributed much of his development in the ring to world welterweight champion Jackie Fields, for whom he served as a sparring partner early in his career.

Ross was unique in the world of boxing as one of its few triple division champions—lightweight, light welterweight and welterweight. Known for his relentless pace, sharp footwork, resilience, and precise combination punching, he was never knocked out in 81 fights and held his title against some of the best competition in the history of the sport. Ross defeated great Hall of Fame champions such as Jimmy McLarnin and Tony Canzoneri twice each, in matches that drew crowds of up to 65,000.

==== Early career ====
Ross's first paid fight was on August 31, 1929, when he defeated Ramon Lugo by decision over six rounds. After winning his first 10 fights, Ross suffered his first loss, a six-round decision to Carlos Garcia. Over his next 36 bouts, Ross compiled a record of 33–1–2, earning victories over Midget Mike O'Dowd, Billy Shaw, and Frankie Hughes.

On August 26, 1932, Ross faced veteran title contender Ray Miller, flooring him with a left hook in the opening round and staggering him again in the sixth with a left to the body followed by a right to the chin en route to a one-sided unanimous decision victory. Ross then knocked out Frankie Petrolle in the second round, before facing former world featherweight champion Battling Battalino on October 21. Entering as an 8-to-5 favorite, Ross thoroughly outpointed Battalino, winning nine of the ten rounds. Eager for a title shot against reigning world champion Tony Canzoneri, Ross next faced Goldie Hess in a ten-round bout at Chicago Stadium on November 11. Ross dominated the fight, landing rights and lefts at will with machine-gun-like speed and repeatedly staggering Hess, who managed to remain on his feet. Ross won every round en route to a unanimous decision victory.

On January 30, 1933, Ross faced Johnny Datto in a scheduled ten-round bout in Pittsburgh, Pennsylvania, knocking him out in the second round with a powerful right to the chin. He next faced Tommy Grogan, who outweighed him by seven pounds, and knocked him down three times on his way to victory. Ross followed with a unanimous decision victory over leading lightweight contender Billy Petrolle, Frankie's older brother, in an exciting battle that saw Petrolle constantly pressing forward while Ross frequently responded with flurries of punches. After the bout, Tony Canzoneri remarked, "He outboxed Billy and hurt him several times. I'll be glad to meet him."

During this run, Ross made his first appearance in The Ring magazine's top-ten lightweight rankings in May 1931, broke into the top five by October 1932, and became the world's No. 1-ranked lightweight contender in February 1933.

==== World Champion ====
Having established himself as the world's top-ranked lightweight contender, Ross received his first world title opportunity on June 23, 1933, against reigning world lightweight and light welterweight champion and fellow future three-division world champion Tony Canzoneri in Chicago. Ross campaigned heavily throughout the city in the lead-up to the fight, but nevertheless entered as a 6-to-5 underdog. He prevailed by decision over 10 rounds in a tightly contested, defensive affair, becoming a two-division world champion, with Canzoneri reportedly shocked by the decision.

After knocking out Johnny Farr in six rounds, Ross faced Canzoneri again, defeating him by decision for a second time, this time over 15 rounds. Taking the challenge a step further, Ross agreed to face Canzoneri on his home turf at the Polo Grounds in New York City. Ross opened a cut beneath Canzoneri's right eye in the seventh round and, despite fighting beyond 10 rounds for the first time in his career, showed no signs of tiring as he got the better of Canzoneri over the final four rounds. The judges were split, with one voting for each fighter, leaving the decision to referee Arthur Donovan, who scored eight rounds for Ross, four for Canzoneri, and three even. Enraged by the decision, Canzoneri's father climbed into the ring and grabbed a stool, apparently intending to throw it at the officials, before being restrained by police.

Ross retained his light welterweight title with a composed decision victory over Sammy Fuller to finish 1933 and another decision over Pete Nebo to begin 1934, with an impressive second victory over Billy Petrolle in a non-title bout in between. He next defended the title against former world champion Frankie Klick, with the bout ending in a draw after Ross rallied over the final four rounds following a slow start. Ross followed with two more successful defenses, outpointing Kid Moro and Bobby Pacho.

After repeatedly calling out world welterweight champion Jimmy McLarnin, Ross finally faced him in the first of their three bouts on May 28, 1934. McLarnin had developed a reputation for defeating prominent Jewish fighters, having knocked out Benny Leonard, Al Singer, Ruby Goldstein, Sid Terris, Louis "Kid" Kaplan, and Joe Glick. Ross sought to avenge their defeats, adding significance to the bout for him and his Jewish supporters.

Throughout the fight, Ross continually pressed McLarnin and fought him at close range. By the 14th round, McLarnin struggled to maintain the pace as Ross rallied, bloodying his nose, reopening cuts beneath his eyes, and causing his left eye to begin closing. Ross defeated McLarnin by decision in 15 rounds to capture the welterweight title, becoming a three-division world champion and the first lightweight champion in history to also win the welterweight championship. The bout was later retroactively named The Ring magazine's Fight of the Year for 1934.

Ross returned to Chicago to a hero's welcome, with thousands lining the streets as he rode in the back of an open automobile during a police-escorted parade to City Hall. There, he was greeted by Mayor Edward Joseph Kelly and Governor Henry Horner, with Kelly presenting him with a giant golden Key to the City.

McLarnin regained the title by decision in a rematch less than four months later. The fight was a fierce back-and-forth battle that left both men badly battered. By the end, McLarnin's left eye was completely closed, his nose was bleeding, and his lips were split, while Ross's left eye was half-closed, his right eye was cut, and his lips were similarly split. McLarnin, exhausted by the pace of the fight, also slipped to the canvas twice in the 15th round. With the two judges divided, referee Arthur Donovan broke the deadlock by awarding McLarnin 10 rounds, a decision met with boos and protests from the crowd. 10 of the 13 ringside critics scored the fight for Ross, including the Associated Press.

Ross then returned to light welterweight and began a 21-bout winning streak, retaining his title with a 12-round decision over Bobby Pacho in their second meeting on December 10, 1934. After another successful defense against Klick, Ross faced Henry Woods, knocking him down for a nine-count in the third round and winning by a wide decision, with the United Press scoring every round but the first in Ross's favor. Ross vacated both his lightweight and light welterweight titles on April 15, 1935, citing difficulties making weight.

Ross then moved back up to welterweight for his third and final bout with McLarnin on May 28, entering the ring nearly four pounds lighter than McLarnin. By the time of the rubber match, the Associated Press reported that Ross had become the bigger attraction of the two fighters. Ross tore into McLarnin throughout the fight and regained the title by unanimous decision over 15 rounds, with newspaper critics crediting him with winning 10 rounds through sheer aggression.

Ross facing off with Phil Furr at the weigh-in, 1936

On September 6, 1935, Ross continued his winning streak against Baby Joe Gans, knocking him down with a left to the jaw just 10 seconds into the second round. Gans rose at the count of nine but staggered upon reaching his feet, prompting referee Tom Loutitt to stop the bout. On September 13, Ross faced future world middleweight champion Ceferino Garcia, suffering two knockdowns—the first and only official knockdowns of his career. However, Ross rallied in the second round and gradually made up the deficit in an action-packed ten-round contest, ultimately earning a narrow points decision. In their rematch on November 29, Ross twice staggered Garcia with fierce two-fisted attacks but was unable to floor him, as Garcia withstood the punishment. Ross nevertheless earned a unanimous decision victory.

On March 11, 1936, Ross faced reigning Canadian welterweight champion Gordon Wallace in Vancouver, British Columbia, with the two fighting on even terms through the first eight rounds. Wallace opened the ninth aggressively, landing a left and a looping right to Ross's head. Late in the round, however, Ross ducked beneath a right swing and countered with a two-fisted volley that sent Wallace reeling backward. Ross followed up by driving Wallace against the ropes and pounding his body with both hands until the bell. Wallace came out aggressively in the final round, throwing caution to the wind, but by the closing moments was draped over Ross in apparent exhaustion as the champion drove uppercuts to his chin and stomach en route to a majority decision victory. In his next bout, Ross faced Chuck Woods with baseball legend Babe Ruth in attendance and former world heavyweight champion Jack Dempsey serving as referee. Ross stopped Woods with a shower of blows in the fifth round. On June 10, Ross faced Laddie Tonielli, drawing blood from his nose in the second round before knocking him out one minute and 20 seconds into the fifth. Ross landed a right to the jaw and, as Tonielli began to fall, followed with another right that sent him flat on his back, unconscious. Several minutes passed before Tonielli was able to regain his feet. Ross then knocked out Morrie Sherman in the second round of his next bout.

On November 27, 1936, Ross defended his welterweight title against Izzy Jannazzo. Although Ross had faded considerably as a fighter by this point, he retained the title by unanimous decision over 15 rounds. He next outpointed Al Manfredo before meeting Woods in a rematch. After drawing blood from Woods' nose in the second round, Ross knocked him down twice in the third. In the fourth, Ross battered Woods with rights and lefts before landing a right flush on the jaw that sent him to the canvas for the full ten count. Ross later knocked out Jackie Burke in the fifth round at Heinemann Park, before earning another decision victory over Manfredo.

Ross then faced Garcia for the third and final time on September 23, 1937, in what proved to be the final defense of his welterweight title. Despite fracturing his left hand in the second round, Ross showed improved form from his defense against Jannazzo. Garcia suffered a deep gash on his forehead in the fifth and fought the remaining ten rounds with his face covered in blood, but Ross went on to retain the title with a unanimous decision victory over 15 rounds.

The 21st and final victory of the streak came in Ross's penultimate fight, when he faced the previously undefeated Bobby Venner in a non-title bout despite being outweighed by seven pounds. Ross knocked Venner down four times before flooring him again in the seventh round, prompting Venner's corner to throw in the towel.

==== Final bout and retirement ====
In his final fight, Ross defended his title against fellow three-division world champion Henry Armstrong on May 31, 1938. Entering as a 2-to-1 favorite, Ross controlled the early rounds with his jab, before Armstrong took command and subjected him to a sustained beating en route to a 15-round decision victory. Although Ross's trainers begged him to let them stop the fight, he refused to quit or go down. When referee Arthur Donovan later tried to stop the bout, Ross pleaded, "Let me finish. I promise you I’ll never fight again, but I got to go all the way." Ross, who had previously made his corner promise never to throw in the towel on his behalf, survived all 15 rounds.

Ross had never been knocked out in his career and was determined to leave the ring on his feet. When later asked why he had refused to quit, he replied, "A champ's got the right to choose the way he goes out." Some boxing experts view Ross's performance against Armstrong as one of the most courageous in history. His determination to remain on his feet has also been attributed to his awareness of his symbolic importance to Jews, representing the idea that Jews would not only fight back, but would not go down.

Following the fight, Ross announced his retirement in his dressing room, stating, "I was beaten by a better fighter." He retired with a professional record of 74–4–3, including 22 knockout victories, and compiled a 10–2 record against six different fighters who were later inducted into the International Boxing Hall of Fame and/or World Boxing Hall of Fame. (Note: Henry Armstrong (WBHOF & IBHOF), Tony Canzoneri (WBHOF & IBHOF), Jimmy McLarnin (WBHOF & IBHOF), Billy Petrolle (WBHOF & IBHOF), Ceferino Garcia (WBHOF), Battling Battalino (IBHOF).) Ross also went undefeated throughout his career at light welterweight. He earned approximately $500,000 over the course of his boxing career.

== World War II ==
=== Anti-Nazi activism ===
In the late 1930s, Ross participated in a campaign by Jewish gangsters, boxers, and other activists to disrupt meetings of pro-Nazi organizations in the United States. The campaign began in New York after Judge Nathan D. Perlman secretly enlisted mobster Meyer Lansky to organize opposition to Nazi gatherings, on the condition that no one be killed. Perlman subsequently approached Chicago mobster Jake "Greasy Thumb" Guzik to organize a similar effort in Chicago. Ross was among those who took part, attending meetings of the German American Bund in disguise with other members of the group, prepared to respond with their fists, clubs, or whatever else was necessary to break up the gatherings.

=== Military service ===
Ross featured in a 1943 issue of Real Life Comics

Ross would later enlist as a private in the United States Marine Corps on April 21, 1942, to fight in World War II. He trained at the Marine Corps Recruit Depot San Diego in California, receiving a medal for efficiency two weeks after beginning boot camp and graduating as the honor man of his platoon after seven weeks. Ross also served as an instructor in a boot camp course on self-defense, demonstrating fighting techniques to assembled platoons around a raised ring. The Marines wanted to keep him stateside and use his celebrity status to boost morale. Most of the athletes of the era, like heavyweight champion Jack Dempsey, had ceremonial roles in the military, but Ross insisted on fighting for his country.

Before he was to go overseas, Ross physically assaulted a non-commissioned officer who had made an antisemitic remark. He was to be court martialed at Marine Corps Recruit Depot San Diego. The other board members wanted to throw the book at Ross, but Captain Berthol E. Davis, who was also Jewish and knew of Ross's achievements, convinced the rest of the board to allow Ross to go overseas and avoid punishment.

Ross was then sent to the Pacific Theater, where he underwent jungle training at Pago Pago on the island of Tutuila. While stationed there, a 215-pound Samoan heavyweight champion had been dominating U.S. Navy heavyweights in boxing matches, prompting the Marines to ask Ross to face him. Despite the considerable size difference and fighting in 16-ounce gloves, Ross knocked the Samoan down 11 times before stopping him in the sixth round. After the bout, a local chief reportedly offered Ross his daughter in marriage. In October 1942, Ross departed aboard the USS President Hayes for the Solomon Islands, arriving at Guadalcanal on November 4.

Ross served with B Company, 1st Battalion, 8th Marines during the Battle of Guadalcanal in the South Pacific. On November 19, 1942, his unit crossed the Matanikau River to provide flank security for the advancing 182nd Infantry Regiment and was ambushed by Japanese forces while waiting for the Army to advance. Suffering from malaria, he and three comrades were pinned down under heavy enemy fire in a shell hole. All four were wounded; Ross was the only one able to continue fighting. He gathered his comrades' rifles and grenades and, over the course of the night, threw 21 hand grenades and fired hundreds of rounds of ammunition, single-handedly fighting nearly two dozen Japanese soldiers and killing them all by morning. Believing that he would not survive the night, Ross repeatedly recited the Shema Yisrael and later recalled speaking to his deceased father throughout the ordeal.

After the action, Ross's helmet was found to be dented by 30 pieces of shrapnel. Two of the Marines were killed, but Ross carried the third on his shoulders to safety, despite the man weighing 230 lb (104 kg) compared to Ross' 140 lb (64 kg). Ross emerged from the fighting with minor shrapnel wounds and shell shock, later recalling, "For 10 days I had a complete loss of memory from the pounding of the mortars. I couldn’t even remember my name. I imagine it was like being knocked out." He was subsequently promoted to corporal and recommended for the Distinguished Service Cross. After recovering from his wounds, Ross returned to frontline combat five more times as American forces drove the Japanese northward through the jungle.

Ross was awarded America's third highest military honor, the Silver Star, as well as the Purple Heart and a Presidential Unit Citation. As one of America's greatest "celebrity" war heroes, Ross received a presidential citation from President Franklin D. Roosevelt for his heroism on Guadalcanal and was later honored by Roosevelt in a Rose Garden ceremony. He was also awarded the Edward J. Neil Trophy as boxing's "man of the year" for 1942 by the New York Boxing Writers Association.

During his time in Guadalcanal, Ross began a lifelong friendship with the Catholic priest Frederic Gehring, a wartime chaplain who wrote regular correspondences for Reader's Digest magazine. Gehring considered Ross a national treasure who defied logic when it came to bravery and the defense of principle. Ross was the only person on Guadacanal capable of playing the temperamental pipe organ kept there. On Christmas Eve, before he and his fellow Marines were to go into battle, Gehring asked Ross to learn "Silent Night" and other Christmas songs for the troops. After Ross had played them, Gehring asked him to play a Jewish song. Ross played "My Yiddishe Momma," about a child's love for his self-sacrificing mother. Many of the Marines knew the melody of the song from Ross's boxing days, when it was played when he entered the ring. When the Marines heard Ross play the song, newspaper reports say, they were all in tears.

Ross was later promoted to sergeant before the end of the war. On April 14, 1944, he received an honorable medical discharge from the United States Marine Corps at the Brooklyn Navy Yard.

== Drug addiction and recovery ==
Recovering at the hospital from malaria and his wounds suffered at Guadalcanal, Ross developed a dependency on the morphine he was administered for pain. In February 1943, he was recovering at a naval hospital in the South Pacific from his fourth attack of malaria. After returning to the United States, malaria struck for a fifth time on the evening of March 15, when he collapsed shortly before he was scheduled to address 15,000 people at a Red Cross rally at Madison Square Garden.

About a year after his discharge from the Marines, Ross experienced another bout of malaria and a recurrence of severe migraine headaches, prompting him to resume the drug treatment he had received during the war. When doctors became increasingly reluctant to prescribe morphine, Ross turned to street heroin. His addiction eventually grew to cost him as much as $500 per day. To help with his financial troubles, he was gifted money by gangster Abner Zwillman. Ross kept his addiction hidden from his wife, Cathy, for years and became increasingly distant from her, eventually leading her to divorce him in July 1946. On September 11, 1946, Ross voluntarily surrendered to federal authorities in New York and submitted to a technical arrest so that he could receive treatment at the U.S. Public Health Service Hospital in Lexington, Kentucky. He remained there for approximately four months and was discharged in January 1947, with hospital officials declaring him cured.

Ross subsequently became an outspoken anti-drug advocate, speaking to high school students across the United States about the dangers of drug abuse and visiting veterans struggling with addiction. He also launched a personal anti-drug crusade, speaking at neighborhood rallies and appealing to addicts to seek treatment and expose narcotics peddlers. Ross later said that drug dealers had threatened him by telephone because of his campaign.

In September 1955, he testified before the U.S. Senate Subcommittee on Illicit Narcotics Traffic about his addiction and recovery, recounting his treatment at Lexington and crediting the hospital’s medical officer, Victor H. Vogel, with persuading him to remain in treatment after Ross initially sought to leave after only ten or eleven days. His struggle with drug addiction was later depicted in the 1957 biographical film Monkey on My Back.

== Personal life ==
In 1933, Ross had earned enough money from boxing to fulfill his longtime goal of reuniting his family. A few weeks before his first world title fight, he removed his three younger siblings from the orphanage and reunited them with their mother.

While training at a resort in the Catskill Mountains, Ross met Pearl Siegel, whom he married in December 1937. The couple divorced shortly after Ross retired from boxing.

Ross with his wife Cathy Howlett, 1943

Ross later married former Ziegfeld Follies dancer Cathy Howlett in July 1942. In August 1944, the couple moved to Los Angeles. They divorced in July 1946 before remarrying in July 1949. Although they had no children together, Ross was stepfather to Howlett's daughter, Noreen, from a previous marriage.

Ross also maintained an apartment at Hampshire House in New York City. By November 1963, he was residing in apartment 10E at 301 East 86th Street in Manhattan.

Ross was a close lifelong friend of politician and businessman Ira Colitz, who briefly managed Ross's cocktail lounge in Chicago in 1941.

During his boxing career, Ross developed an interest in the coin-machine industry and became fascinated by the people involved in the business. He remained closely associated with the industry for years, helping bring prominent entertainers and celebrities to its functions and making appearances at conventions and other industry events.

Ross was also an avid but notoriously unsuccessful gambler, betting on dice, horse races, and ballgames. He was particularly fond of the racetrack, where he reportedly lost much of the money he earned during his boxing career.

== Later life and death ==
In 1945, Ross, James Tarantino, and Henry Sanicola incorporated the entertainment magazine Hollywood Nite-Life in California. Frank Sinatra reportedly helped finance the venture with $15,000. The group operated the magazine for approximately six months before Tarantino acquired full ownership. In June 1946, Ross joined the Milton Blackstone advertising agency in New York City as an account executive. In 1947, Ross was offered a position as matchmaker for Sinatra's proposed boxing shows, contingent upon Sinatra receiving approval from the California State Athletic Commission.

Ross also became a prominent supporter of the Bergson Group, becoming active in its Emergency Committee to Save the Jewish People of Europe and later the American League for a Free Palestine. He spoke at the League's rallies, and in 1947, a group of St. Louis Jewish gangsters associated with mobster Mickey Cohen organized a fundraiser on the condition that Ross serve as keynote speaker. The event reportedly raised more than $100,000 for the cause of Jewish statehood. Alongside British Major Samuel Weiser, Ross also co-organized the League's George Washington Legion, which recruited American veterans to aid Jewish forces in Mandatory Palestine. Ross also reportedly helped smuggle weapons to the Irgun in support of the creation of Israel, storing weapons at his apartment in Hampshire House in New York City. According to his biographer Douglas Century, Ross served as a conduit for weapons supplied by Jewish organized-crime figures, including Meyer Lansky and Bugsy Siegel.

In Sport Life's July 1951 edition, the author pointed out to readers to be aware of tricksters impersonating sport personalities to gain gifts and freebies. The magazine closed the article by highlighting how Ross had walked into a restaurant, where a faker was impersonating Jackie "Kid" Berg and was surrounded by admirers. "So you're Jackie Kid Berg?" the inwardly boiling Ross inquired as he approached the 200-pounder. "Sure" the faker responded. Ross then threw a right hand punch and flattened the phony. "If you were really Jackie Kid Berg, you could have easily taken that punch without going down!"

In 1957, Ross wrote an autobiography titled No Man Stands Alone. By 1961, Ross had served for 11 years as director of special services for Armed Forces News Magazine and was a senior associate with Bennett Public Relations, Inc., handling special publicity assignments. He was also associated with Grossinger's resort while continuing to manage talent in connection with Broadway, Hollywood, and television.

Ross spent his later years traveling extensively, making frequent appearances at dinners and sports programs, refereeing Golden Gloves tournaments, and using his celebrity status in promotional work for casinos and other businesses. He also served as a referee for professional bouts from 1939 to 1965, officiating fights involving notable boxers such as Willie Joyce, Billy Conn, Joey Maxim, Rocky Graziano, Willie Pep, Flash Elorde, Éder Jofre, Fighting Harada, and George Chuvalo.

Ross also remained loyal to his childhood friend Jack Ruby, testifying as a character witness on Ruby's behalf during his 1964 trial for killing Lee Harvey Oswald, who was charged with the killings of President John F. Kennedy and Dallas patrolman J. D. Tippit.

Ross had been an outpatient at the Veterans Administration Research Hospital in Chicago since June 1966, and by the end of November had undergone 10 weeks of cobalt treatment for throat cancer. He died at his Lake Shore Drive apartment at 10:45 a.m. on January 18, 1967, at the age of 57. His funeral was held two days later at the Original Weinstein and Sons Funeral Chapel. He was buried at Rosemont Park Cemetery.

During Ross's battle with cancer, friends in the coin-machine industry established the Barney Ross Fund in his honor, raising contributions and organizing a benefit wrestling event on his behalf. Following his death, the event went ahead as planned, with the proceeds instead going to his widow, Cathy.

== Awards and honors ==
In 1936, the Chicago Golden Gloves created a new sportsmanship trophy named after Ross to be awarded to the outstanding welterweight. The Aleph Zadik Aleph chapter located in Chicago's south suburbs (primarily in Flossmoor, Homewood, and Olympia Fields), is named in his honor.

In 1938, former world heavyweight champion Jack Dempsey described Ross as "the greatest fighter of the day." The Sporting News later named Ross as one of four honorable mentions for its 1930s Fighter of the Decade. Bleacher Report described Ross, Tony Canzoneri, and Jimmy McLarnin as boxing's great "Holy Trinity," whose three-way rivalry helped define the sport during the 1930s.

In its May 1994 issue, The Ring magazine ranked Ross as the third-greatest light welterweight and fourth-greatest welterweight of all time. In 1999, the Associated Press ranked Ross as the second-greatest light welterweight and fifth-greatest welterweight of the 20th century. In 2002, The Ring ranked him 21st on its list of the "80 Best Fighters of the Last 80 Years."

In 2005, ESPN ranked Ross's three bouts with Jimmy McLarnin as the third-greatest trilogy in boxing history. ESPN ranked Ross as the 22nd-greatest boxer of all time in 2007. In 2008, BoxingScene ranked him as the second-greatest Jewish boxer of all time. Two years later, Bleacher Report ranked him as the 12th-greatest Jewish athlete of all time. In 2012, Complex included Ross on its list of "The Most Badass Jewish Sports Figures of All Time." The following year, Ross was included on Bleacher Report's list of the ten greatest boxers who were never knocked out. In November 2022, BoxRec ranked Ross as the 18th-greatest pound for pound boxer of all time. In 2026, the New England Sports Network ranked Ross as the eighth-greatest lightweight boxer of all time.

=== Halls of Fame ===
- The Ring magazine Hall of Fame – Class of 1956
- International Jewish Sports Hall of Fame – Class of 1979 (inaugural inductee)
- World Boxing Hall of Fame – Class of 1981
- Chicagoland Sports Hall of Fame – Class of 1985
- International Boxing Hall of Fame – Class of 1990 (inaugural inductee)
- National Jewish Sports Hall of Fame and Museum – Class of 1997
- Marine Corps Sports Hall of Fame – Class of 2006
- The Jewish-American Hall of Fame – Class of 2010
- Illinois Boxing Hall of Fame – Class of 2016

=== Boxing awards ===
- 3× The Ring magazine Merit Award, as the man who did the most for boxing: 1933, 1935, 1942
- The Ring magazine Fight of the Year vs Jimmy McLarnin I on May 28, 1934
- 2× Ring magazine Fighter of the Year: 1934, 1935
- Edward J. Neil Trophy: 1942
  - Was also one of five representatives who accepted the 1943 award on behalf of more than 4,000 active and former boxers serving in the United States Armed Forces
- Spokane Athletic Round Table Sportsmanship Award: 1942

=== Military decorations ===
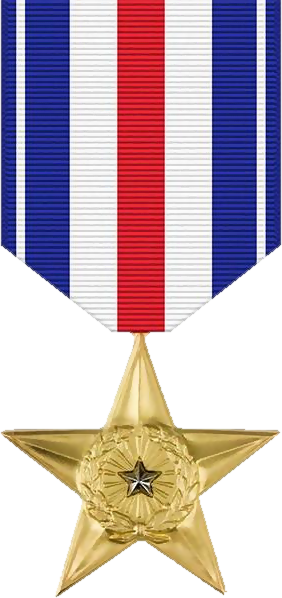
- Silver Star
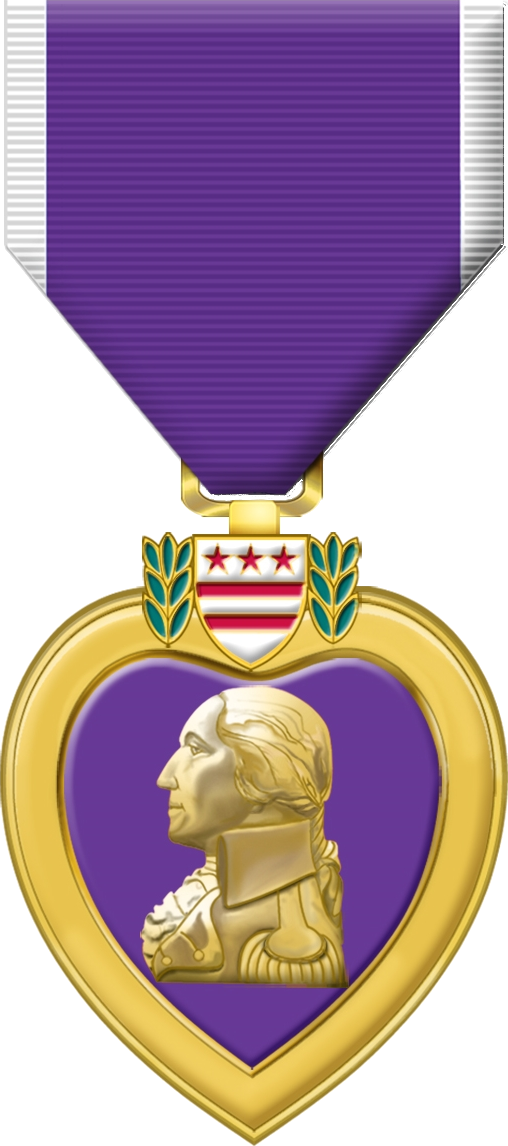
- Purple Heart
- Presidential Unit Citation with two bronze stars
- American Campaign Medal
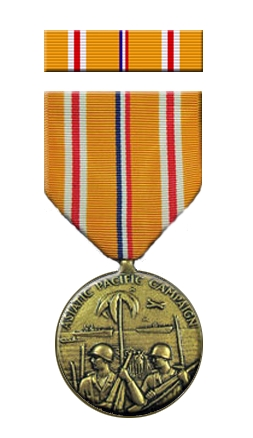
- Asiatic–Pacific Campaign Medal with one silver star
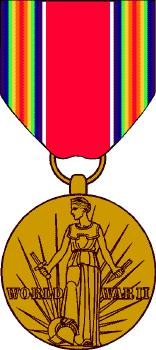
- World War II Victory Medal

=== State/Local ===
- Key to the City of Chicago: June 4, 1934

=== Other honors ===
- Ross received a citation for bravery above and beyond the call of duty by the American Red Cross: 1943
- Ross received a personal citation from President Franklin D. Roosevelt for his heroism on Guadalcanal: November 22, 1943
- Gold medallion awarded to Ross by the Helms Athletic Foundation in recognition of his achievements in boxing and military service: September 1944
- Onondaga Post No. 131 of the Jewish War Veterans of the United States of America honored Ross with a plaque for his honorable and distinguished service to his country and humanitarian work for the State of Israel: October 26, 1948

== Professional boxing record ==
All information in this section is derived from BoxRec, unless otherwise stated.

=== Official record ===
81 fights	72 wins	4 losses
By knockout	22	0
By decision	50	4
Draws	3	
Newspaper decisions/draws	2	

All newspaper decisions are officially regarded as “no decision” bouts and are not counted in the win/loss/draw column.

No.	Result	Record	Opponent	Type	Round	Date	Location	Notes
81	Loss	72–4–3 (2)	Henry Armstrong	UD	15	May 31, 1938	Madison Square Garden Bowl, New York City, New York, U.S.	Lost NYSAC, NBA, and The Ring welterweight titles
80	Win	72–3–3 (2)	Bobby Venner	TKO	7 (10)	Apr 25, 1938	Shrine Auditorium, Des Moines, Iowa, U.S.	
79	Win	71–3–3 (2)	Henry Schaft	TKO	4 (10)	Apr 4, 1938	Armory, Minneapolis, Minnesota, U.S.	
78	Win	70–3–3 (2)	Ceferino Garcia	UD	15	Sep 23, 1937	Polo Grounds, New York City, New York, U.S.	Retained NYSAC, NBA, and The Ring welterweight titles
77	Win	69–3–3 (2)	Al Manfredo	NWS	10	Aug 19, 1937	Western League Baseball Park, Des Moines, Iowa, U.S.	
76	Win	69–3–3 (1)	Jackie Burke	KO	5 (10)	Jun 27, 1937	Heinemann Park, New Orleans, Louisiana, U.S.	
75	Win	68–3–3 (1)	Chuck Woods	KO	4 (10)	Jun 17, 1937	Perry Stadium, Indianapolis, Indiana, U.S.	
74	Win	67–3–3 (1)	Al Manfredo	PTS	10	Jan 29, 1937	Olympia Stadium, Detroit, Michigan, U.S.	
73	Win	66–3–3 (1)	Izzy Jannazzo	UD	15	Nov 27, 1936	Madison Square Garden, New York City, New York, U.S.	Retained NYSAC, NBA, and The Ring welterweight titles
72	Win	65–3–3 (1)	Phil Furr	UD	10	Jul 22, 1936	Griffith Stadium, Washington, D.C., U.S.	
71	Win	64–3–3 (1)	Morrie Sherman	KO	2 (10)	Jun 22, 1936	City Auditorium, Omaha, Nebraska, U.S.	
70	Win	63–3–3 (1)	Laddie Tonielli	TKO	5 (10)	Jun 10, 1936	State Fair Park, Milwaukee, Wisconsin, U.S.	
69	Win	62–3–3 (1)	Chuck Woods	TKO	5 (10)	May 1, 1936	Jefferson County Armory, Louisville, Kentucky, U.S.	
68	Win	61–3–3 (1)	Gordon Wallace	MD	10	Mar 11, 1936	Arena, Vancouver, British Columbia, Canada	
67	Win	60–3–3 (1)	Lou Halper	TKO	8 (10)	Jan 27, 1936	Convention Hall, Philadelphia, Pennsylvania, U.S.	
66	Win	59–3–3 (1)	Ceferino Garcia	UD	10	Nov 29, 1935	Chicago Stadium, Chicago, Illinois, U.S.	
65	Win	58–3–3 (1)	Ceferino Garcia	PTS	10	Sep 13, 1935	Dreamland Auditorium, San Francisco, California, U.S.	
64	Win	57–3–3 (1)	Baby Joe Gans	KO	2 (10)	Sep 6, 1935	Multnomah Stadium, Portland, Oregon, U.S.	
63	Win	56–3–3 (1)	Jimmy McLarnin	UD	15	May 28, 1935	Polo Grounds, New York City, New York, U.S.	Won NYSAC, NBA, and The Ring welterweight titles
62	Win	55–3–3 (1)	Henry Woods	UD	12	Apr 9, 1935	Civic Auditorium, Seattle, Washington, U.S.	Retained world light welterweight title
61	Win	54–3–3 (1)	Frankie Klick	UD	10	Jan 28, 1935	Municipal Stadium, Miami, Florida, U.S.	Retained world light welterweight title
60	Win	53–3–3 (1)	Bobby Pacho	PTS	12	Dec 10, 1934	Public Hall, Cleveland, Ohio, U.S.	Retained world light welterweight title
59	Loss	52–3–3 (1)	Jimmy McLarnin	SD	15	Sep 17, 1934	Madison Square Garden Bowl, New York City, New York, U.S.	Lost NYSAC, NBA, and The Ring welterweight titles
58	Win	52–2–3 (1)	Jimmy McLarnin	SD	15	May 28, 1934	Madison Square Garden Bowl, New York City, New York, U.S.	Won NYSAC, NBA, and The Ring welterweight titles
57	Win	51–2–3 (1)	Bobby Pacho	PTS	10	Mar 27, 1934	Olympic Auditorium, Los Angeles, California, U.S.	Retained world light welterweight title
56	Win	50–2–3 (1)	Kid Moro	PTS	10	Mar 14, 1934	Auditorium, Oakland, California, U.S.	Retained world light welterweight title
55	Draw	49–2–3 (1)	Frankie Klick	PTS	10	Mar 5, 1934	Civic Auditorium, San Francisco, California, U.S.	Retained world light welterweight title
54	Win	49–2–2 (1)	Pete Nebo	PTS	12	Feb 7, 1934	Convention Hall, Kansas City, Missouri, U.S.	Retained world light welterweight title
53	Win	48–2–2 (1)	Billy Petrolle	UD	10	Jan 24, 1934	New York Coliseum, New York City, New York, U.S.	
52	Win	47–2–2 (1)	Sammy Fuller	MD	10	Nov 17, 1933	Chicago Stadium, Chicago, Illinois, U.S.	Retained world light welterweight title
51	Win	46–2–2 (1)	Tony Canzoneri	SD	15	Sep 12, 1933	Polo Grounds, New York City, New York, U.S.	Retained NYSAC, NBA, and The Ring lightweight titles; Retained world light welterweight title
50	Win	45–2–2 (1)	Johnny Farr	TKO	6 (10)	Jul 26, 1933	Convention Hall, Kansas City, Missouri, U.S.	Retained world light welterweight title
49	Win	44–2–2 (1)	Tony Canzoneri	MD	10	Jun 23, 1933	Chicago Stadium, Chicago, Illinois, U.S.	Won NYSAC, NBA, and The Ring lightweight titles; Won world light welterweight title
48	Win	43–2–2 (1)	Joe Ghnouly	PTS	10	May 3, 1933	Arena, St. Louis, Missouri, U.S.	
47	Win	42–2–2 (1)	Billy Petrolle	UD	10	Mar 22, 1933	Chicago Stadium, Chicago, Illinois, U.S.	
46	Win	41–2–2 (1)	Tommy Grogan	PTS	10	Feb 22, 1933	Washington Blvd. Auditorium, Chicago, Illinois, U.S.	
45	Win	40–2–2 (1)	Johnny Datto	KO	2 (10)	Jan 30, 1933	Motor Square Garden, Pittsburgh, Pennsylvania, U.S.	
44	Win	39–2–2 (1)	Johnny Farr	PTS	10	Nov 25, 1932	Auditorium, Milwaukee, Wisconsin, U.S.	
43	Win	38–2–2 (1)	Goldie Hess	PTS	10	Nov 11, 1932	Chicago Stadium, Chicago, Illinois, U.S.	
42	Win	37–2–2 (1)	Battling Battalino	UD	10	Oct 21, 1932	Chicago Stadium, Chicago, Illinois, U.S.	
41	Win	36–2–2 (1)	Frankie Petrolle	KO	2 (10)	Sep 15, 1932	Coliseum, Chicago, Illinois, U.S.	
40	Win	35–2–2 (1)	Ray Miller	UD	10	Aug 26, 1932	Sparta Stadium, Chicago, Illinois, U.S.	
39	Win	34–2–2 (1)	Henry Perlick	TKO	3 (8)	Jul 28, 1932	Sparta Stadium, Chicago, Illinois, U.S.	
38	Win	33–2–2 (1)	Dick Sisk	TKO	6 (8)	May 20, 1932	Chicago Stadium, Chicago, Illinois, U.S.	
37	Win	32–2–2 (1)	Frankie Hughes	PTS	10	Apr 5, 1932	Armory, Indianapolis, Indiana, U.S.	
36	Win	31–2–2 (1)	Nick Ellenwood	PTS	10	Mar 2, 1932	Armory, Muncie, Indiana, U.S.	
35	Win	30–2–2 (1)	Billy Gladstone	PTS	6	Feb 18, 1932	Chicago Stadium, Chicago, Illinois, U.S.	
34	Win	29–2–2 (1)	Micky O'Neill	PTS	6	Feb 8, 1932	Auditorium, Milwaukee, Wisconsin, U.S.	
33	Win	28–2–2 (1)	Jimmy Lundy	PTS	8	Nov 18, 1931	Convention Hall, Kansas City, Missouri, U.S.	
32	Win	27–2–2 (1)	Young Terry	PTS	8	Nov 13, 1931	Moline Field House, Moline, Illinois, U.S.	
31	Win	26–2–2 (1)	Lou Jallos	PTS	8	Nov 4, 1931	Chicago Stadium, Chicago, Illinois, U.S.	
30	Win	25–2–2 (1)	Glen Gamp	PTS	10	Oct 2, 1931	Eagles Arena, Chicago, Illinois, U.S.	
29	Win	24–2–2 (1)	Jimmy Alvarado	PTS	8	Jul 30, 1931	Navin Field, Detroit, Michigan, U.S.	
28	Win	23–2–2 (1)	Babe Ruth	TKO	4 (10)	Jul 15, 1931	Armory, Benton Harbor, Michigan, U.S.	
27	Win	22–2–2 (1)	Billy Shaw	PTS	8	May 13, 1931	Cicero Stadium, Cicero, Illinois, U.S.	
26	Win	21–2–2 (1)	Jackie Dugan	KO	2 (8)	May 1, 1931	Moline Field House, Moline, Illinois, U.S.	
25	Win	20–2–2 (1)	Lud Abella	TKO	2 (6)	Apr 24, 1931	Chicago Stadium, Chicago, Illinois, U.S.	
24	Win	19–2–2 (1)	Midget Mike O'Dowd	PTS	8	Apr 8, 1931	Moline Field House, Moline, Illinois, U.S.	
23	Loss	18–2–2 (1)	Roger Bernard	PTS	8	Mar 27, 1931	Chicago Stadium, Chicago, Illinois, U.S.	
22	Win	18–1–2 (1)	Jackie Davis	PTS	6	Mar 20, 1931	Cicero Stadium, Cicero, Illinois, U.S.	
21	Win	17–1–2 (1)	Young Terry	UD	10	Feb 20, 1931	Cicero Stadium, Cicero, Illinois, U.S.	
20	Win	16–1–2 (1)	Henry Falegano	PTS	8	Jan 14, 1931	Chicago Stadium, Chicago, Illinois, U.S.	
19	Draw	15–1–2 (1)	Harry Dublinsky	PTS	8	Nov 21, 1930	Chicago Stadium, Chicago, Illinois, U.S.	
18	Win	15–1–1 (1)	Petey Mack	KO	1 (8)	Nov 6, 1930	Chicago Stadium, Chicago, Illinois, U.S.	
17	Win	14–1–1 (1)	Sammy Binder	KO	2 (6)	Oct 14, 1930	Chicago Stadium, Chicago, Illinois, U.S.	
16	Draw	13–1–1 (1)	Young Terry	PTS	8	Sep 19, 1930	Jones & Baumrucker Park, Chicago, Illinois, U.S.	
15	Win	13–1 (1)	Luis Perez	KO	1 (6)	Aug 2, 1930	Chicago Stadium, Chicago, Illinois, U.S.	
14	Win	12–1 (1)	Eddie Koppy	PTS	6	Jul 1, 1930	Michigan State Fairgrounds, Detroit, Michigan, U.S.	
13	Win	11–1 (1)	Mickey Genaro	PTS	6	Apr 25, 1930	Coliseum, Chicago, Illinois, U.S.	
12	Loss	10–1 (1)	Carlos Garcia	PTS	6	Apr 21, 1930	Coliseum, Chicago, Illinois, U.S.	
11	Win	10–0 (1)	Eddie Bojack	TKO	2 (4)	Apr 8, 1930	Public Hall, Cleveland, Ohio, U.S.	
10	Win	9–0 (1)	Jackie Davis	NWS	4	Mar 3, 1930	Arena, St. Louis, Missouri, U.S.	
9	Win	9–0	Jiro Kumagai	PTS	4	Feb 24, 1930	Recreation Park, San Francisco, California, U.S.	
8	Win	8–0	Johnny Andrews	PTS	4	Jan 24, 1930	Chicago Stadium, Chicago, Illinois, U.S.	
7	Win	7–0	Louis New	PTS	6	Jan 10, 1930	Chicago Stadium, Chicago, Illinois, U.S.	
6	Win	6–0	Al DeRose	PTS	6	Dec 5, 1929	Ashland Blvd. Auditorium, Chicago, Illinois, U.S.	
5	Win	5–0	Joey Barth	PTS	5	Nov 29, 1929	Guyon's Paradise Ballroom, Chicago, Illinois, U.S.	
4	Win	4–0	Virgil Tobin	KO	2 (4)	Oct 21, 1929	State Armory, San Francisco, California, U.S.	
3	Win	3–0	Joe Borola	PTS	6	Oct 12, 1929	Main Street Athletic Club, Los Angeles, California, U.S.	
2	Win	2–0	Joe Borola	PTS	6	Sep 14, 1929	Main Street Athletic Club, Los Angeles, California, U.S.	
1	Win	1–0	Ramon Lugo	PTS	6	Aug 31, 1929	Main Street Athletic Club, Los Angeles, California, U.S.	

=== Unofficial record ===
81 fights	74 wins	4 losses
By knockout	22	0
By decision	52	4
Draws	3	

Record with the inclusion of newspaper decisions in the win/loss/draw column.

No.	Result	Record	Opponent	Type	Round	Date	Location	Notes
81	Loss	74–4–3	Henry Armstrong	UD	15	May 31, 1938	Madison Square Garden Bowl, New York City, New York, U.S.	Lost NYSAC, NBA, and The Ring welterweight titles
80	Win	74–3–3	Bobby Venner	TKO	7 (10)	Apr 25, 1938	Shrine Auditorium, Des Moines, Iowa, U.S.	
79	Win	73–3–3	Henry Schaft	TKO	4 (10)	Apr 4, 1938	Armory, Minneapolis, Minnesota, U.S.	
78	Win	72–3–3	Ceferino Garcia	UD	15	Sep 23, 1937	Polo Grounds, New York City, New York, U.S.	Retained NYSAC, NBA, and The Ring welterweight titles
77	Win	71–3–3	Al Manfredo	NWS	10	Aug 19, 1937	Western League Baseball Park, Des Moines, Iowa, U.S.	
76	Win	70–3–3	Jackie Burke	KO	5 (10)	Jun 27, 1937	Heinemann Park, New Orleans, Louisiana, U.S.	
75	Win	69–3–3	Chuck Woods	KO	4 (10)	Jun 17, 1937	Perry Stadium, Indianapolis, Indiana, U.S.	
74	Win	68–3–3	Al Manfredo	PTS	10	Jan 29, 1937	Olympia Stadium, Detroit, Michigan, U.S.	
73	Win	67–3–3	Izzy Jannazzo	UD	15	Nov 27, 1936	Madison Square Garden, New York City, New York, U.S.	Retained NYSAC, NBA, and The Ring welterweight titles
72	Win	66–3–3	Phil Furr	UD	10	Jul 22, 1936	Griffith Stadium, Washington, D.C., U.S.	
71	Win	65–3–3	Morrie Sherman	KO	2 (10)	Jun 22, 1936	City Auditorium, Omaha, Nebraska, U.S.	
70	Win	64–3–3	Laddie Tonielli	TKO	5 (10)	Jun 10, 1936	State Fair Park, Milwaukee, Wisconsin, U.S.	
69	Win	63–3–3	Chuck Woods	TKO	5 (10)	May 1, 1936	Jefferson County Armory, Louisville, Kentucky, U.S.	
68	Win	62–3–3	Gordon Wallace	MD	10	Mar 11, 1936	Arena, Vancouver, British Columbia, Canada	
67	Win	61–3–3	Lou Halper	TKO	8 (10)	Jan 27, 1936	Convention Hall, Philadelphia, Pennsylvania, U.S.	
66	Win	60–3–3	Ceferino Garcia	UD	10	Nov 29, 1935	Chicago Stadium, Chicago, Illinois, U.S.	
65	Win	59–3–3	Ceferino Garcia	PTS	10	Sep 13, 1935	Dreamland Auditorium, San Francisco, California, U.S.	
64	Win	58–3–3	Baby Joe Gans	KO	2 (10)	Sep 6, 1935	Multnomah Stadium, Portland, Oregon, U.S.	
63	Win	57–3–3	Jimmy McLarnin	UD	15	May 28, 1935	Polo Grounds, New York City, New York, U.S.	Won NYSAC, NBA, and The Ring welterweight titles
62	Win	56–3–3	Henry Woods	UD	12	Apr 9, 1935	Civic Auditorium, Seattle, Washington, U.S.	Retained world light welterweight title
61	Win	55–3–3	Frankie Klick	UD	10	Jan 28, 1935	Municipal Stadium, Miami, Florida, U.S.	Retained world light welterweight title
60	Win	54–3–3	Bobby Pacho	PTS	12	Dec 10, 1934	Public Hall, Cleveland, Ohio, U.S.	Retained world light welterweight title
59	Loss	53–3–3	Jimmy McLarnin	SD	15	Sep 17, 1934	Madison Square Garden Bowl, New York City, New York, U.S.	Lost NYSAC, NBA, and The Ring welterweight titles
58	Win	53–2–3	Jimmy McLarnin	SD	15	May 28, 1934	Madison Square Garden Bowl, New York City, New York, U.S.	Won NYSAC, NBA, and The Ring welterweight titles
57	Win	52–2–3	Bobby Pacho	PTS	10	Mar 27, 1934	Olympic Auditorium, Los Angeles, California, U.S.	Retained world light welterweight title
56	Win	51–2–3	Kid Moro	PTS	10	Mar 14, 1934	Auditorium, Oakland, California, U.S.	Retained world light welterweight title
55	Draw	50–2–3	Frankie Klick	PTS	10	Mar 5, 1934	Civic Auditorium, San Francisco, California, U.S.	Retained world light welterweight title
54	Win	50–2–2	Pete Nebo	PTS	12	Feb 7, 1934	Convention Hall, Kansas City, Missouri, U.S.	Retained world light welterweight title
53	Win	49–2–2	Billy Petrolle	UD	10	Jan 24, 1934	New York Coliseum, New York City, New York, U.S.	
52	Win	48–2–2	Sammy Fuller	MD	10	Nov 17, 1933	Chicago Stadium, Chicago, Illinois, U.S.	Retained world light welterweight title
51	Win	47–2–2	Tony Canzoneri	SD	15	Sep 12, 1933	Polo Grounds, New York City, New York, U.S.	Retained NYSAC, NBA, and The Ring lightweight titles; Retained world light welterweight title
50	Win	46–2–2	Johnny Farr	TKO	6 (10)	Jul 26, 1933	Convention Hall, Kansas City, Missouri, U.S.	Retained world light welterweight title
49	Win	45–2–2	Tony Canzoneri	MD	10	Jun 23, 1933	Chicago Stadium, Chicago, Illinois, U.S.	Won NYSAC, NBA, and The Ring lightweight titles; Won world light welterweight title
48	Win	44–2–2	Joe Ghnouly	PTS	10	May 3, 1933	Arena, St. Louis, Missouri, U.S.	
47	Win	43–2–2	Billy Petrolle	UD	10	Mar 22, 1933	Chicago Stadium, Chicago, Illinois, U.S.	
46	Win	42–2–2	Tommy Grogan	PTS	10	Feb 22, 1933	Washington Blvd. Auditorium, Chicago, Illinois, U.S.	
45	Win	41–2–2	Johnny Datto	KO	2 (10)	Jan 30, 1933	Motor Square Garden, Pittsburgh, Pennsylvania, U.S.	
44	Win	40–2–2	Johnny Farr	PTS	10	Nov 25, 1932	Auditorium, Milwaukee, Wisconsin, U.S.	
43	Win	39–2–2	Goldie Hess	PTS	10	Nov 11, 1932	Chicago Stadium, Chicago, Illinois, U.S.	
42	Win	38–2–2	Battling Battalino	UD	10	Oct 21, 1932	Chicago Stadium, Chicago, Illinois, U.S.	
41	Win	37–2–2	Frankie Petrolle	KO	2 (10)	Sep 15, 1932	Coliseum, Chicago, Illinois, U.S.	
40	Win	36–2–2	Ray Miller	UD	10	Aug 26, 1932	Sparta Stadium, Chicago, Illinois, U.S.	
39	Win	35–2–2	Henry Perlick	TKO	3 (8)	Jul 28, 1932	Sparta Stadium, Chicago, Illinois, U.S.	
38	Win	34–2–2	Dick Sisk	TKO	6 (8)	May 20, 1932	Chicago Stadium, Chicago, Illinois, U.S.	
37	Win	33–2–2	Frankie Hughes	PTS	10	Apr 5, 1932	Armory, Indianapolis, Indiana, U.S.	
36	Win	32–2–2	Nick Ellenwood	PTS	10	Mar 2, 1932	Armory, Muncie, Indiana, U.S.	
35	Win	31–2–2	Billy Gladstone	PTS	6	Feb 18, 1932	Chicago Stadium, Chicago, Illinois, U.S.	
34	Win	30–2–2	Micky O'Neill	PTS	6	Feb 8, 1932	Auditorium, Milwaukee, Wisconsin, U.S.	
33	Win	29–2–2	Jimmy Lundy	PTS	8	Nov 18, 1931	Convention Hall, Kansas City, Missouri, U.S.	
32	Win	28–2–2	Young Terry	PTS	8	Nov 13, 1931	Moline Field House, Moline, Illinois, U.S.	
31	Win	27–2–2	Lou Jallos	PTS	8	Nov 4, 1931	Chicago Stadium, Chicago, Illinois, U.S.	
30	Win	26–2–2	Glen Gamp	PTS	10	Oct 2, 1931	Eagles Arena, Chicago, Illinois, U.S.	
29	Win	25–2–2	Jimmy Alvarado	PTS	8	Jul 30, 1931	Navin Field, Detroit, Michigan, U.S.	
28	Win	24–2–2	Babe Ruth	TKO	4 (10)	Jul 15, 1931	Armory, Benton Harbor, Michigan, U.S.	
27	Win	23–2–2	Billy Shaw	PTS	8	May 13, 1931	Cicero Stadium, Cicero, Illinois, U.S.	
26	Win	22–2–2	Jackie Dugan	KO	2 (8)	May 1, 1931	Moline Field House, Moline, Illinois, U.S.	
25	Win	21–2–2	Lud Abella	TKO	2 (6)	Apr 24, 1931	Chicago Stadium, Chicago, Illinois, U.S.	
24	Win	20–2–2	Midget Mike O'Dowd	PTS	8	Apr 8, 1931	Moline Field House, Moline, Illinois, U.S.	
23	Loss	19–2–2	Roger Bernard	PTS	8	Mar 27, 1931	Chicago Stadium, Chicago, Illinois, U.S.	
22	Win	19–1–2	Jackie Davis	PTS	6	Mar 20, 1931	Cicero Stadium, Cicero, Illinois, U.S.	
21	Win	18–1–2	Young Terry	UD	10	Feb 20, 1931	Cicero Stadium, Cicero, Illinois, U.S.	
20	Win	17–1–2	Henry Falegano	PTS	8	Jan 14, 1931	Chicago Stadium, Chicago, Illinois, U.S.	
19	Draw	16–1–2	Harry Dublinsky	PTS	8	Nov 21, 1930	Chicago Stadium, Chicago, Illinois, U.S.	
18	Win	16–1–1	Petey Mack	KO	1 (8)	Nov 6, 1930	Chicago Stadium, Chicago, Illinois, U.S.	
17	Win	15–1–1	Sammy Binder	KO	2 (6)	Oct 14, 1930	Chicago Stadium, Chicago, Illinois, U.S.	
16	Draw	14–1–1	Young Terry	PTS	8	Sep 19, 1930	Jones & Baumrucker Park, Chicago, Illinois, U.S.	
15	Win	14–1	Luis Perez	KO	1 (6)	Aug 2, 1930	Chicago Stadium, Chicago, Illinois, U.S.	
14	Win	13–1	Eddie Koppy	PTS	6	Jul 1, 1930	Michigan State Fairgrounds, Detroit, Michigan, U.S.	
13	Win	12–1	Mickey Genaro	PTS	6	Apr 25, 1930	Coliseum, Chicago, Illinois, U.S.	
12	Loss	11–1	Carlos Garcia	PTS	6	Apr 21, 1930	Coliseum, Chicago, Illinois, U.S.	
11	Win	11–0	Eddie Bojack	TKO	2 (4)	Apr 8, 1930	Public Hall, Cleveland, Ohio, U.S.	
10	Win	10–0	Jackie Davis	NWS	4	Mar 3, 1930	Arena, St. Louis, Missouri, U.S.	
9	Win	9–0	Jiro Kumagai	PTS	4	Feb 24, 1930	Recreation Park, San Francisco, California, U.S.	
8	Win	8–0	Johnny Andrews	PTS	4	Jan 24, 1930	Chicago Stadium, Chicago, Illinois, U.S.	
7	Win	7–0	Louis New	PTS	6	Jan 10, 1930	Chicago Stadium, Chicago, Illinois, U.S.	
6	Win	6–0	Al DeRose	PTS	6	Dec 5, 1929	Ashland Blvd. Auditorium, Chicago, Illinois, U.S.	
5	Win	5–0	Joey Barth	PTS	5	Nov 29, 1929	Guyon's Paradise Ballroom, Chicago, Illinois, U.S.	
4	Win	4–0	Virgil Tobin	KO	2 (4)	Oct 21, 1929	State Armory, San Francisco, California, U.S.	
3	Win	3–0	Joe Borola	PTS	6	Oct 12, 1929	Main Street Athletic Club, Los Angeles, California, U.S.	
2	Win	2–0	Joe Borola	PTS	6	Sep 14, 1929	Main Street Athletic Club, Los Angeles, California, U.S.	
1	Win	1–0	Ramon Lugo	PTS	6	Aug 31, 1929	Main Street Athletic Club, Los Angeles, California, U.S.	

== Titles in boxing ==
=== Major world titles ===
- NYSAC lightweight champion (135 lbs)
- NBA (WBA) lightweight champion (135 lbs)
- World light welterweight champion (140 lbs)
- NYSAC welterweight champion (147 lbs) (2×)
- NBA (WBA) welterweight champion (147 lbs) (2×)

=== The Ring magazine titles ===
- The Ring lightweight champion (135 lbs)
- The Ring welterweight champion (147 lbs) (2×)

=== Lineal titles ===
- Lineal lightweight champion
- Lineal light welterweight champion
- Lineal welterweight champion (2×)

=== Undisputed titles ===
- Undisputed lightweight champion
- Undisputed welterweight champion (2×)

=== Amateur titles ===
- Intercity Golden Gloves featherweight champion (1929)
- Chicago Golden Gloves featherweight champion (1929)
- Paddy Harmon's International Tournament featherweight champion (1929)

== Filmography ==
=== Portrayals ===
Year	Title	Notes	Ref
1957	Monkey on My Back	Cameron Mitchell portrays Ross	

=== Film appearances ===
Year	Title	Ref.
1962	Requiem for a Heavyweight	
1965	The Doctor and the Playgirl	

=== In popular culture ===
The 1947 film Body and Soul, starring John Garfield, originated as a project based on Ross's life. In 1945, Garfield purchased the rights to Ross's life story, and an initial screenplay, titled The Burning Journey, was submitted to the Production Code Authority for approval on July 11, 1946. After Ross publicly disclosed his drug addiction that September, however, plans to portray his life were abandoned and the project was retitled. Elements of Ross's experiences nevertheless remained apparent in the finished film, and although the filmmakers publicly denied that Body and Soul was based on him, they acknowledged similarities and paid Ross an agreed $50,000.

In The Expendables film franchise, Sylvester Stallone portrays a character named Barney Ross. Given Stallone's iconic association with boxing through his portrayal of Rocky Balboa, the character's name is a fitting tribute to Ross.

== See also ==
- Undisputed championship
- Lineal championship
- List of world lightweight boxing champions
- List of world light welterweight boxing champions
- List of world welterweight boxing champions
- List of boxing triple champions
- List of select Jewish boxers

== Notes and references ==
=== References ===
Amateur boxing titles
Previous: Tony Caragliano	Intercity Golden Gloves; Featherweight Champion; 1929	Next: Joe Conforti
Previous: George Root	Chicago Golden Gloves; Featherweight Champion; 1929	Next: Benny Goldblatt
Achievements
Preceded by Tony Canzoneri	World Lightweight Champion; June 23, 1933 – April 15, 1935; Vacated	Vacant Title next held by Tony Canzoneri
Preceded by Tony Canzoneri	The Ring Lightweight Champion; June 23, 1933 – 1933; Vacated	Vacant Title next held by Tony Canzoneri
Preceded by Tony Canzoneri	World Light Welterweight Champion; June 23, 1933 – April 15, 1935; Vacated	Vacant Title next held by Tippy Larkin
Preceded by Jimmy McLarnin	World Welterweight Champion; May 28, 1934 – September 17, 1934	Succeeded by Jimmy McLarnin
Preceded by Jimmy McLarnin	The Ring Welterweight Champion; May 28, 1934 – September 17, 1934	Succeeded by Jimmy McLarnin
Preceded by Jimmy McLarnin	World Welterweight Champion; May 28, 1935 – May 31, 1938	Succeeded by Henry Armstrong
Preceded by Jimmy McLarnin	The Ring Welterweight Champion; May 28, 1935 – May 31, 1938	Succeeded by Henry Armstrong
Awards
Preceded by Max Baer vs Max Schmeling	The Ring magazine Fight of the Year; 1934 vs Jimmy McLarnin	Succeeded by Joe Louis vs Max Baer
Vacant Title last held by Jack Sharkey	The Ring magazine Fighter of the Year; 1934, 1935	Succeeded by Joe Louis
Preceded by Joe Louis	Edward J. Neil Trophy; 1942	Succeeded by Boxers of the Armed Forces
