= George Foster (boxer) =

American boxer

George Foster (May 30, 1940 – February 24, 2019) was an American amateur champion and professional boxer.

== Early life ==
Foster was born in Cincinnati, Ohio.

== Amateur career ==
Representing Ohio, Foster won the 1960 United States Amateur Featherweight Championship, the 1962 United States Amateur Lightweight Championship and 1962 Golden Gloves Featherweight Championship.

== Pro career ==
Known as "Kid Foster", Foster turned pro in 1962 and retired in 1972 after a TKO loss to Esteban De Jesús, a bout in which Foster was knocked down once in the 2nd, 3rd, and 6th rounds.

== Death ==
Foster died on February 24, 2019, at the age of 78.
