= Olympia Theatre =

Olympia Theatre or Theater may refer to:

- Gordon's Olympia Theatre (Boston), Massachusetts, U.S., 1910s–1996
- Liverpool Olympia, England
- Olympia City Music Theatre "Maria Callas", formerly the Olympia Theatre, Athens, Greece
- Olympia London, England
- Olympia (Paris), France
- Olympia Theatre, Dublin, Ireland
- Olympia Theater (Miami), Florida, U.S., opened in 1926
- Olympia Theatre (Montreal), Canada, built 1925
- Olympia Theatre (New York City), New York, U.S., opened 1895

== See also ==
- Olympic Theater (disambiguation)
