= Kid Moro =

Filipino boxer

Personal information
- Nickname: Love Me Tonight
- Born: Severo Bascon
- Weight: Lightweight; Light welterweight Welterweight

Boxing career

Boxing record
- Total fights: 82
- Wins: 50
- Win by KO: 6
- Losses: 14
- Draws: 17
- No contests: 1

Kid Moro (born Severo Bascon) was a Filipino professional boxer from 1919 to 1938. He held the Orient and Hawaii State titles at both lightweight and welterweight at various points between 1928 and 1938.

== Personal life ==
Moro was from Cebu, Philippines. He was married to Agnes Uyetake, a Hawaii-born woman of Japanese descent. The couple had two sons, Severo Bascon Jr. and Abraham Bascon, both of whom later lived in the United States and worked as masons. Abraham also served as a pastor for more than 50 years.

=== Conviction ===
Following World War II, Moro was charged with treason for allegedly assisting Japanese forces during the Japanese occupation of the Philippines. He was accused of working with the Japanese military police in Cebu, including helping identify and apprehend members of the Filipino resistance. Moro was convicted by the People's Court and sentenced to life imprisonment and a ₱1,000 fine. His conviction and sentence were upheld by the Supreme Court of the Philippines on March 29, 1949.

== Boxing career ==
Moro began his professional career with consecutive bouts against future world flyweight champion Pancho Villa, losing both by knockout.

On December 5, 1925, Johnny Hill defeated Moro for the vacant Orient lightweight title. Moro then outpointed future world middleweight champion Ceferino Garcia over 12 rounds before facing Kid Johnson in a bout originally scheduled for the Orient featherweight title. After both fighters failed to make weight, the title was taken off the line, and Moro comfortably outpointed Johnson over 12 rounds.

Moro and Ceferino Garcia met in a rematch on April 28, 1928, this time with Garcia's Orient welterweight title at stake. Moro again prevailed, defeating Garcia on points over 12 rounds to capture the title. On April 16, 1932, Moro defeated Ignacio Fernandez to capture the Orient lightweight title. The two met twice more in succession, with Moro successfully defending both his Orient lightweight and welterweight titles in their third and final meeting.

On November 3, 1933, Moro faced future three-division world champion Henry Armstrong in a non-title bout in Pismo Beach, California. After the referee awarded Armstrong the decision, spectators protested the ruling and stormed the ring, believing Moro had won the fight. The two subsequently met in rematches in Stockton and Watsonville, both of which ended in draws.

On March 14, 1934, Moro challenged another three-division world champion, Barney Ross, for the world light welterweight title in Oakland, California, losing by decision over ten rounds.

Having already defeated Fred Rico Merino twice, Moro faced him for a third time on October 18, 1935, knocking him out in the first round of a scheduled ten-round bout to win the Hawaii welterweight title. On January 17, 1936, Moro faced Tony Roccaforte in the first of their five meetings, all of which Moro would win. After a back-and-forth opening four rounds, Moro took control in the fifth, throwing caution to the wind and battering Roccaforte with crisp rights and lefts to the head and body. Sensing he was behind, Roccaforte opened up in the final round and swung wildly for a knockout, but Moro met him punch for punch, concentrating his attack on the body en route to a points victory.

After their first match ended in a draw, Moro and Sonny Valdez had a rematch on January 31, 1936, with Moro outpointing Valdez over eight rounds for the Hawaii lightweight title. On September 18, Moro faced Bobby Pacho in a rematch, several years after Pacho had knocked him out with what many fans regarded as a lucky punch. Moro left little doubt in their second meeting, winning the decision by a wide margin after nearly sweeping every round.

On September 17, 1937, Moro earned a one-sided unanimous decision over Tommy Jones in ten rounds. He cut Jones' lip in the fifth round, nearly knocked him down in the seventh, and knocked out his mouthpiece three times during the bout. In his final professional bout on May 21, 1938, Moro faced Kid Vicente for the vacant Orient welterweight title, defeating him on points at the Rizal Memorial Coliseum in Manila, Philippines, to capture the title.

Moro retired from professional boxing in 1938 with a career record of 50 wins, 14 losses, 17 draws, and one no contest.

== Professional boxing record ==
82 fights	50 wins	14 losses
By knockout	6	5
By decision	44	9
Draws	17	
No contests	1	

No.	Result	Record	Opponent	Type	Round, time	Date	Location	Notes
82	Win	50–14–17 (1)	Kid Vicente	PTS	10	May 21, 1938	Rizal Memorial Coliseum, Manila, Philippines	Won vacant Orient welterweight title
81	Win	49–14–17 (1)	California Joe Rivers	PTS	10	Jan 28, 1938	Civic Auditorium, Honolulu, Hawaii, U.S.	
80	Win	48–14–17 (1)	Buenaventura de Guzman	PTS	10	Jan 7, 1938	Civic Auditorium, Honolulu, Hawaii, U.S.	
79	Win	47–14–17 (1)	Chief Crazy Horse	PTS	8	Dec 3, 1937	Civic Auditorium, Honolulu, Hawaii, U.S.	
78	Win	46–14–17 (1)	Tommy Jones	UD	10	Sep 17, 1937	Civic Auditorium, Honolulu, Hawaii, U.S.	
77	Win	45–14–17 (1)	Red Farmer	PTS	8	Sep 10, 1937	Civic Auditorium, Honolulu, Hawaii, U.S.	
76	Loss	44–14–17 (1)	Johnny Di Sopa	PTS	6	Jun 11, 1937	Civic Auditorium, Honolulu, Hawaii, U.S.	
75	Draw	44–13–17 (1)	Baby Johnson	PTS	10	Mar 12, 1937	Civic Auditorium, Honolulu, Hawaii, U.S.	
74	Draw	44–13–16 (1)	Baby Tiger Flowers	PTS	8	Dec 18, 1936	Civic Auditorium, Honolulu, Hawaii, U.S.	
73	Draw	44–13–15 (1)	Baby Tiger Flowers	PTS	8	Nov 14, 1936	Kekaha Stadium, Kekaha, Kauai, Hawaii, U.S.	
72	Win	44–13–14 (1)	Hoyt Jones	PTS	8	Oct 17, 1936	Civic Auditorium, Honolulu, Hawaii, U.S.	
71	Win	43–13–14 (1)	Bobby Pacho	PTS	10	Sep 18, 1936	Civic Auditorium, Honolulu, Hawaii, U.S.	
70	Draw	42–13–14 (1)	Buenaventura de Guzman	PTS	10	Sep 11, 1936	Civic Auditorium, Honolulu, Hawaii, U.S.	Retained USA Hawaii State lightweight title
69	Win	42–13–13 (1)	Leonard Bennett	PTS	10	Aug 15, 1936	Civic Auditorium, Honolulu, Hawaii, U.S.	
68	Draw	41–13–13 (1)	Leonard Bennett	PTS	8	Jul 31, 1936	Civic Auditorium, Honolulu, Hawaii, U.S.	
67	Win	41–13–12 (1)	Tony Roccaforte	PTS	8	Jul 11, 1936	Armory, Lihue, Hawaii, U.S.	
66	Win	40–13–12 (1)	Tony Roccaforte	PTS	8	Jun 19, 1936	Civic Auditorium, Honolulu, Hawaii, U.S.	Retained USA Hawaii State welterweight title
65	Win	39–13–12 (1)	Huerta Evans	PTS	10	May 29, 1936	Honolulu Stadium, Honolulu, Hawaii, U.S.	Retained USA Hawaii State lightweight and welterweight titles
64	Win	38–13–12 (1)	Tony Roccaforte	PTS	8	Apr 11, 1936	Volcano Arena, Hilo, Hawaii, U.S.	
63	Win	37–13–12 (1)	Tony Roccaforte	PTS	8	Mar 6, 1936	Civic Auditorium, Honolulu, Hawaii, U.S.	Retained USA Hawaii State welterweight title
62	Win	36–13–12 (1)	Al Schaff	PTS	10	Feb 28, 1936	Civic Auditorium, Honolulu, Hawaii, U.S.	
61	Win	35–13–12 (1)	Sonny Valdez	PTS	8	Jan 31, 1936	Civic Auditorium, Honolulu, Hawaii, U.S.	Won USA Hawaii State lightweight title
60	Win	34–13–12 (1)	Tony Roccaforte	PTS	8	Jan 17, 1936	Civic Auditorium, Honolulu, Hawaii, U.S.	
59	Win	33–13–12 (1)	Tod Morgan	PTS	10	Nov 15, 1935	Civic Auditorium, Honolulu, Hawaii, U.S.	
58	Win	32–13–12 (1)	Fred Rico Merino	KO	1 (10)	Oct 18, 1935	Civic Auditorium, Honolulu, Hawaii, U.S.	Won USA Hawaii State welterweight title
57	Draw	31–13–12 (1)	Sonny Valdez	PTS	8	Sep 13, 1935	Civic Auditorium, Honolulu, Hawaii, U.S.	
56	Win	31–13–11 (1)	Packo Pass	PTS	6	Sep 6, 1935	Civic Auditorium, Honolulu, Hawaii, U.S.	
55	Win	30–13–11 (1)	Charlie Miller	PTS	8	Aug 2, 1935	Molokai, Hawaii, U.S.	
54	Win	29–13–11 (1)	Walter Strappel	KO	2 (8)	Jul 19, 1935	Civic Auditorium, Honolulu, Hawaii, U.S.	
53	Win	28–13–11 (1)	Mariano Matias	PTS	8	Jun 22, 1935	Armory, Lihue, Hawaii, U.S.	
52	Win	27–13–11 (1)	Ramon Dias	PTS	8	Jun 8, 1935	Volcano Arena, Hilo, Hawaii, U.S.	
51	Win	26–13–11 (1)	Charlie Miller	PTS	10	May 17, 1935	Honolulu Stadium, Honolulu, Hawaii, U.S.	
50	Win	25–13–11 (1)	Mark Diaz	PTS	10	Mar 26, 1935	Memorial Civic Auditorium, Stockton, California, U.S.	
49	Draw	24–13–11 (1)	Battling Gizzy	PTS	6	Mar 19, 1935	Olympic Auditorium, Los Angeles, California, U.S.	
48	Draw	24–13–10 (1)	Johnny Hines	PTS	6	Feb 22, 1935	Legion Stadium, Hollywood, California, U.S.	
47	Win	24–13–9 (1)	Joe Ponce	TKO	1 (10)	Feb 8, 1935	Pismo Beach Arena, Pismo Beach, California, U.S.	
46	Draw	23–13–9 (1)	Joe Ghnouly	PTS	10	Nov 30, 1934	Pismo Beach Arena, Pismo Beach, California, U.S.	
45	Draw	23–13–8 (1)	Sammy Brown	PTS	10	Sep 25, 1934	Ryan's Auditorium, Fresno, California, U.S.	
44	Win	23–13–7 (1)	Manuel Villa I	PTS	10	Sep 3, 1934	Ryan's Auditorium, Fresno, California, U.S.	
43	Win	22–13–7 (1)	Sammy Brown	PTS	10	Aug 7, 1934	Ryan's Auditorium, Fresno, California, U.S.	
42	Draw	21–13–7 (1)	Manuel Villa I	PTS	10	Jul 26, 1934	Memorial Auditorium, Sacramento, California, U.S.	
41	Win	21–13–6 (1)	Emil Cody	TKO	7 (10)	Jul 3, 1934	Memorial Civic Auditorium, Stockton, California, U.S.	
40	Win	20–13–6 (1)	Emil Cody	PTS	8	Jun 11, 1934	Memorial Civic Auditorium, Stockton, California, U.S.	
39	Draw	19–13–6 (1)	Angus Smith	PTS	10	May 29, 1934	Pismo Beach Arena, Pismo Beach, California, U.S.	
38	Draw	19–13–5 (1)	Henry Armstrong	PTS	10	May 4, 1934	Civic Auditorium, Watsonville, California, U.S.	
37	Loss	19–13–4 (1)	Barney Ross	PTS	10	Mar 14, 1934	Auditorium, Oakland, California, U.S.	For world light welterweight title
36	Win	19–12–4 (1)	Ah Wing Lee	PTS	6	Feb 20, 1934	Crystal Pool, Seattle, Washington, U.S.	
35	Win	18–12–4 (1)	Ritchie Thomas	KO	4 (10)	Feb 9, 1934	Imperial Valley A.C., El Centro, California, U.S.	
34	Loss	17–12–4 (1)	Henry Woods	PTS	8	Jan 16, 1934	Crystal Pool, Seattle, Washington, U.S.	
33	Win	17–11–4 (1)	Angus Smith	PTS	10	Jan 1, 1934	Civic Auditorium, Watsonville, California, U.S.	
32	Loss	16–11–4 (1)	Bobby Pacho	KO	2 (10)	Dec 12, 1933	Olympic Auditorium, Los Angeles, California, U.S.	
31	Win	16–10–4 (1)	Sol Lippo	KO	4 (10)	Dec 7, 1933	Bakersfield Arena, Bakersfield, California, U.S.	
30	Draw	15–10–4 (1)	Henry Armstrong	PTS	10	Nov 23, 1933	Memorial Civic Auditorium, Stockton, California, U.S.	
29	Loss	15–10–3 (1)	Henry Armstrong	PTS	10	Nov 3, 1933	Pismo Beach Arena, Pismo Beach, California, U.S.	
28	Loss	15–9–3 (1)	Young Peter Jackson	PTS	10	Oct 19, 1933	Memorial Auditorium, Sacramento, California, U.S.	
27	Win	15–8–3 (1)	Kenny LaSalle	PTS	10	Sep 21, 1933	Memorial Auditorium, Sacramento, California, U.S.	
26	Win	14–8–3 (1)	Fred Rico Merino	PTS	10	Aug 12, 1933	Wailuku Stadium, Wailuku, Hawaii, U.S.	
25	Win	13–8–3 (1)	Baby Tiger Flowers	PTS	10	May 26, 1933	Civic Auditorium, Honolulu, Hawaii, U.S.	
24	Win	12–8–3 (1)	Jimmy Kreiner	PTS	10	May 13, 1933	Volcano Arena, Hilo, Hawaii, U.S.	
23	Win	11–8–3 (1)	Fred Rico Merino	PTS	10	Apr 21, 1933	Honolulu Stadium, Honolulu, Hawaii, U.S.	
22	Win	10–8–3 (1)	Johnny Christmas	PTS	10	Mar 24, 1933	Honolulu Stadium, Honolulu, Hawaii, U.S.	
21	Win	9–8–3 (1)	Kid Arca	PTS	12	Dec 3, 1932	Olympic Stadium, Manila, Philippines	
20	Win	8–8–3 (1)	Kid Vicente	PTS	12	Oct 29, 1932	Stadium, Cebu City, Philippines	
19	NC	7–8–3 (1)	Con Cordero	NC	9 (12)	Sep 3, 1932	Olympic Stadium, Manila, Philippines	
18	Win	7–8–3	Ignacio Fernandez	PTS	15	Jul 2, 1932	Olympic Stadium, Manila, Philippines	Retained Orient lightweight and welterweight titles
17	Win	6–8–3	Ignacio Fernandez	PTS	12	May 21, 1932	Cebu City, Philippines	
16	Win	5–8–3	Ignacio Fernandez	PTS	12	Apr 16, 1932	Olympic Stadium, Manila, Philippines	Won Orient lightweight title
15	Loss	4–8–3	Leonard Rahming	KO	1 (10)	Jul 29, 1931	Bakersfield Arena, Bakersfield, California, U.S.	
14	Draw	4–7–3	Irineo Flores	PTS	12	Dec 29, 1928	Olympic Stadium, Manila, Philippines	For Orient lightweight title
13	Draw	4–7–2	Irineo Flores	PTS	12	Dec 1, 1928	Olympic Stadium, Manila, Philippines	For Orient lightweight title
12	Win	4–7–1	Ceferino Garcia	PTS	12	Apr 28, 1928	Manila, Philippines	Won Orient welterweight title
11	Win	3–7–1	Kid Johnson	PTS	12	Mar 10, 1928	Olympic Stadium, Manila, Philippines	
10	Win	2–7–1	Ceferino Garcia	PTS	12	Nov 6, 1926	Manila, Philippines	
9	Loss	1–7–1	Johnny Hill	PTS	12	Dec 5, 1925	Olympic Stadium, Manila, Philippines	For vacant Orient lightweight title
8	Loss	1–6–1	Pablo Dano	PTS	12	Oct 24, 1925	Manila, Philippines	
7	Win	1–5–1	Johnny Hill	PTS	10	Sep 26, 1925	Cebu, Philippines	
6	Draw	0–5–1	Elino Flores	PTS	10	Aug 29, 1925	Cebu, Philippines	
5	Loss	0–5	Johnny Hill	PTS	12	Oct 25, 1924	Olympic Stadium, Manila, Philippines	
4	Loss	0–4	Johnny Hill	PTS	12	Aug 31, 1924	Olympic Stadium, Manila, Philippines	
3	Loss	0–3	Taiho	TKO	5 (6)	Sep 4, 1923	New World Arena, Manila, Philippines	
2	Loss	0–2	Pancho Villa	KO	3 (?)	Feb 7, 1921	Manila, Philippines	
1	Loss	0–1	Pancho Villa	KO	2 (?)	Apr 1, 1919	Manila, Philippines	

== See also ==
- List of male boxers
