= List of U.S. national Golden Gloves featherweight champions =

This is a list of United States national Golden Gloves champions in the featherweight division, along with the state or region they represented. The weight limit for featherweights was first contested at 126 lb (57 kg), but was lowered to 125 lb (57 kg) in 1967.

- 1928 - George Root - Chicago
- 1929 - Barney Ross - Chicago
- 1930 - Benny Goldblatt - Chicago
- 1931 - Don Gonzales - Cleveland
- 1932 - Joe Roman - Joliet
- 1933 - Leo Rodak - Chicago
- 1934 - Al Nettlow - Detroit
- 1935 - Andy Scrivani - Chicago
- 1936 - Ted Kara - Cleveland
- 1937 - William Joyce - Gary
- 1938 - Eddie Dempsey - Davenport
- 1939 - Tony Ancona - Detroit
- 1940 - Roly Lewis - Muncie
- 1941 - Jack Haley - Kansas City
- 1942 - Sam Derrico - Cleveland
- 1943 - Tony Janiro - Cleveland
- 1944 - Major Jones - Kansas City
- 1945 - Virgil Franklin - Oklahoma City
- 1946 - Jack Dicker - St. Louis
- 1947 - Eddie Marotta - Cleveland
- 1948 - Fernando Rivera - Kansas City
- 1949 - Eugene Robnett - Chicago
- 1950 - Ples Gilmore - Toledo
- 1951 - Ken Davis - Los Angeles
- 1952 - Ken Davis - Los Angeles
- 1953 - Johnny Butler - Grand Rapids
- 1954 - Joe Carles - Los Angeles
- 1955 - Harry Smith - Cedar Rapids
- 1956 - Leroy Jeffrey - Tulsa
- 1957 - Brown McGhee - Montgomery
- 1958 - Fred Morish - Chicago
- 1959 - Don Eddington - St. Louis
- 1960 - Nicholas Spanakos - Hollywood
- 1961 - James Anderson - St. Louis
- 1962 - George Foster - Cleveland
- 1963 - Nick Petrecca - Chicago
- 1964 - Marcus Anderson - Louisville
- 1965 - Marcus Anderson - Louisville
- 1966 - Richard Gillis - Kansas City
- 1967 - Brooks Byrd - Roswell
- 1968 - Lorenzo Trujillo - Fort Worth
- 1969 - James Busceme - Fort Worth
- 1970 - James Busceme - Fort Worth
- 1971 - Louis Self - Toledo
- 1972 - Louis Self - Toledo
- 1973 - Morice Watkins - Fort Worth
- 1974 - William Berry - Elizabeth
- 1975 - Ronnie Shields - Fort Worth
- 1976 - Davie Armstrong - Las Vegas
- 1977 - Bernard Taylor - Knoxville
- 1978 - Bernard Taylor - Knoxville
- 1979 - Roland Cooley - Pennsylvania
- 1980 - Bernard Taylor - Knoxville
- 1981 - Rodney Watts - Columbus
- 1982 - Shelton La Blanc - Lafayette
- 1983 - Andrew Minsker - Las Vegas
- 1984 - Victor Levine - Indiana
- 1985 - Kelcie Banks - Jackson
- 1986 - William Little - Knoxville
- 1987 - Donald Stokes - Louisiana
- 1988 - Stephen Golisano- East Boston
- 1989 - Oscar De La Hoya - Los Angeles
- 1990 - Fernando Sepulveda - Nevada
- 1991 - Fernando Sanchez - Nevada
- 1992 - Michael Clark (boxer) - West Virginia
- 1993 - Guillermo Moreno - California
- 1994 - Augustine Sanchez - Nevada
- 1995 - Christopher Brandon-Maryland
- 1996 - Floyd Mayweather Jr. - Michigan
- 1998 - Aaron Torres - Pennsylvania
- 1999 - Michael Evans - Cincinnati
- 2000 - Rodrick Jones - St. Louis
- 2001 - Aaron Garcia - California
- 2002 - Jason Ray - San Diego
- 2003 - Carney Bowman - Pennsylvania
- 2004 - Jeffrey Peguero - New York Metropolitan Area
- 2005 - Prenice Brewer - Cleveland
- 2006 - Jeffrey Peguero - New York metropolitan area
- 2007 - Hylon Williams - Texas
- 2008 - Keenan Smith - Philadelphia
- 2009 - Robert Rodriguez, Colorado/New Mexico
- 2024 - Julius Ballo - California
