= National Hall =

National Hall may refer to:

- National Hall (Cleveland), a former theatre in Cleveland, Ohio
- National Hall, Holborn, a building in High Holborn, London
- National Hall (Philadelphia), a former theatre in Philadelphia, Pennsylvania
- Celje National Hall, a city hall in Celje, Slovenia
- Trieste National Hall, a building in Trieste, Italy

== See also ==
- Bohemian National Hall, a building in Upper East Side of Manhattan
- Bohemian National Hall (Cleveland), a building in Cleveland, Ohio
- National Statuary Hall, a chamber in the United States Capitol building
- National Theater and Concert Hall, a performing arts venue in Taiwan
- National Hall Historic District, a historic district in Westport, Connecticut
