= Frankie Genovese =

Canadian boxer

Personal information
- Born: 25 November 1915; Toronto, Ontario, Canada
- Died: 19 February 1998 (aged 82); Orillia, Ontario, Canada

Sport
- Sport: Boxing

Frankie Genovese (25 November 1915 – 19 February 1998) was a Canadian boxer. He competed in the men's lightweight event at the 1932 Summer Olympics.
