= Little Pancho =

Filipino boxer

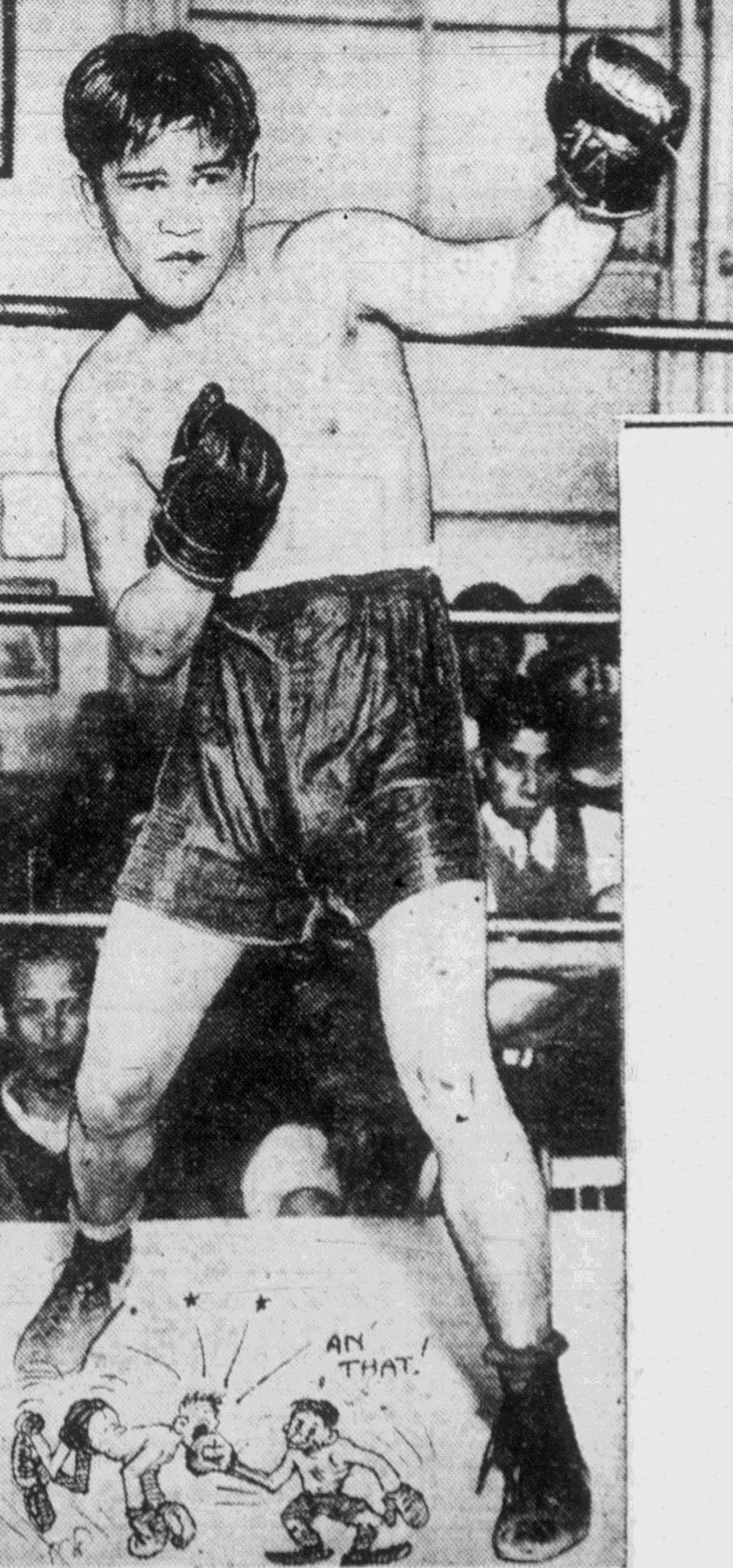
- Little Pancho, circa 1933

Personal information
- Nickname: Young
- Nationality: Filipino
- Born: Eulogio Villaruel Tingson; January 17, 1912 Manila, Metro Manila, Philippines
- Died: May 31, 1969 (aged 57)
- Height: 1.60 m (5 ft 3 in)
- Weight: Flyweight; Bantamweight; Super bantamweight

Boxing career
- Reach: 163 cm (64 in)
- Stance: Orthodox

Boxing record
- Total fights: 151
- Wins: 105
- Win by KO: 22
- Losses: 18
- Draws: 27
- No contests: 1

Eulogio Villaruel Tingson (born January 16, 1912, in Manila, Metro Manila, Philippines) better known as Little Pancho was a Filipino boxer who competed in boxing from 1927 to 1942 and was a former CSAC Bantamweight and World Flyweight title challenger, he was also the younger half-brother of Pancho Villa, his managers includes Manuel Eloriago and Jerry Zukor.

== Professional career ==
=== Early years ===
Little Pancho has fought many great Filipino boxers, such as Joe Mendiola, Pablo Dano, Cris Pineda and Young Tommy during the early points of their careers, Little Pancho suffered his first KO loss against Little Moro whom beat him via 9th Round KO, Little Pancho was entirely fighting at the Philippines during his early years and as he leave the Philippines with a record of 30 victories, 5 losses and 8 draws, he was ready to make a debut in the US.

=== Fighting in the US ===
On March 18, 1932, Pancho made his debut in the US by taking on big-time boxer, Midget Wolgast in Honolulu, where the bout ended in a Unanimous decision win for Wolgast, the decision led the Filipinos to boycott in Honolulu, which caused Pancho and Wolgast to have a rematch where it ended in a tie. Furthermore, he has fought fighters like Joe Tei Ken, Eugène Huat, Ernie Hood, Augie Curtis and former NBA champion (now known as WBA) and gold medalist, Frankie Genaro.

==== Pancho vs. Farber ====
Little Pancho had one unfortunate event as he fought against Lew Farber on June 15, 1934, the bout ended in a tie and has made $1700, which was good for the time and a small town like Watsonville, California, supposedly they were to take another match on the 29th of June of the same year, but when both fighters discovered that the attendance was under 300, they both "ran out".

=== Return to the Philippines ===
Little Pancho fought more great Filipino boxers as he returns to the Philippines, such as Star Frisco, Buenaventura De Guzman, Joe Mendiola, Cris Pineda, Little Dado and olympian, José Villanueva. In addition, he also won the Orient bantamweight title against Star Frisco, Orient junior featherweight title against Joe Eagle, Oriental bantamweight title against Joe Mendiola, Little Pancho lost the Orient bantamweight title against Cris Pineda and also lost the Orient junior featherweight title against Buenaventura De Guzman.

=== Return to the US ===
==== Pancho vs. Moreno ====
Little Pancho returned in the US by taking on Henry Moreno at Honolulu, but the bout ended in a No contest as both were tossed for putting up a poor effort, they both had a rematch which ended in a draw.

==== Championships ====
Little Pancho faced Cris Crispin in a 8-rounder match for the USA Hawaii State bantamweight title which Pancho had success in securing the victory and the title, Pancho battle against more big-time fighters, such as Horace Mann, Louis Salica, Henry Hook and Tony Olivera before winning the American flyweight title against Jackie Jurich. On June 17, 1940, Little Pancho met Little Dado for the 5th time as they fight for the World flyweight championship, despite trying their best to secure the title, no one won as the bout ended in a draw. Little Pancho made his final championship bout as he takes on Tony Olivera for the second time for the CSAC bantamweight title, but Little Pancho was unfortunate.

=== Late years ===
After losing to Tony Olivera for the CSAC title, Little Pancho began to be less fortunate and weakened, as he only won 1 bout out of the fights between the Tony Olivera fight and his last fight against Manuel Ortiz, he also had a bout where his foe, Luis Castillo was sidelined due to Appendicitis, the fight was ruled a TKO win for Castillo, and after losing to Ortiz, he stopped from competing in boxing on 1942 and battled in World War II.

== Professional boxing record ==
151 fights	105 wins	18 losses
By knockout	19	4
By decision	86	14
Draws	27	
No contests	1	

No.	Result	Record	Opponent	Type	Round, Time	Date	Location	Notes
151	Loss	105–18–27 (1)	Manuel Ortiz	KO	7 (10)	6 Mar 1942	Hollywood Legion Stadium, Hollywood, California, U.S.	
150	Loss	105–17–27 (1)	Bobby Carroll	TKO	7 (10)	9 Jan 1942	San Diego Coliseum, San Diego, California, U.S.	
149	Draw	105–16–27 (1)	Elwood Romero	TD	4 (6)	2 Jan 1942	Hollywood Legion Stadium, Hollywood, California, U.S.	TD after Romero suffered a badly-cut left eye
148	Draw	105–16–26 (1)	Elwood Romero	PTS	10	4 Dec 1941	San Diego Coliseum, San Diego, California, U.S.	
147	Draw	105–16–25 (1)	Elwood Romero	PTS	8	21 Nov 1941	San Diego Coliseum, San Diego, California, U.S.	
146	Loss	105–16–24 (1)	Luis Castillo	TKO	2 (10)	23 Aug 1941	El Toreo de Cuatro Caminos, Mexico City, Mexico	Castillo was side-lined after the bout because of appendicitis, with a long recovery period, evidently he had been very seriously ill
145	Win	105–15–24 (1)	Babe Antuna	PTS	6	4 Aug 1941	Ocean Park Arena, Santa Monica, California, U.S.	
144	Loss	104–15–24 (1)	Jackie Jurich	PTS	10	17 Jun 1941	San Jose Civic Auditorium, San Jose, California, U.S.	
143	Loss	104–14–24 (1)	Tony Olivera	PTS	10	9 Jun 1941	Coliseum Bowl, San Francisco, California, U.S.	For CSAC bantamweight title
142	Win	104–13–24 (1)	Charley Higa	KO	6 (8) 0:38	9 May 1941	Honolulu Civic Auditorium, Honolulu, Hawaii, U.S.	
141	Win	103–13–24 (1)	Adolph Samuels	PTS	10	4 Apr 1941	Honolulu Stadium, Honolulu, Hawaii, U.S.	
140	Loss	102–13–24 (1)	David Kui Kong Young	PTS	10	7 Feb 1941	Honolulu Civic Auditorium, Honolulu, Hawaii, U.S.	
139	Win	102–12–24 (1)	Jess LaBarba	KO	1 (10) 2:42	17 Dec 1940	San Jose Civic Auditorium, San Jose, California, U.S.	
138	Win	101–12–24 (1)	Lupe Cordoza	PTS	10	28 Nov 1940	Sacramento Memorial Auditorium, Sacramento, California, U.S.	
137	Win	100–12–24 (1)	Horace Mann	PTS	10	21 Oct 1940	Coliseum Bowl, San Francisco, California, U.S.	
136	Win	99–12–24 (1)	Bobby Gray	KO	2 (8)	11 Oct 1940	Watsonville Civic Auditorium, Watsonville, California, U.S.	
135	Win	98–12–24 (1)	Dom Kid Den	KO	6 (10)	1 Oct 1940	San Jose Civic Auditorium, San Jose, California, U.S.	
134	Win	97–12–24 (1)	Owen Hinck	PTS	8	20 Sep 1940	Watsonville Civic Auditorium, Watsonville, California, U.S.	
133	Win	96–12–24 (1)	Johnny Martin	TKO	8 (10)	2 Sep 1940	Pismo Beach Arena, Pismo Beach, California, U.S.	
132	Win	95–12–24 (1)	Benny Dawson	TKO	3 (8)	30 Aug 1940	Watsonville Civic Auditorium, Watsonville, California, U.S.	
131	Win	94–12–24 (1)	Elwood Romero	TKO	8 (10)	13 Aug 1940	San Jose Civic Auditorium, San Jose, California, U.S.	Romero's corner stopped the bout after the 8th round
130	Draw	93–12–24 (1)	Little Dado	PTS	10	17 Jun 1940	San Francisco Civic Auditorium, San Francisco, California, U.S.	For NBA flyweight title
129	Win	93–12–23 (1)	Horace Mann	PTS	10	1 May 1940	National Hall, San Francisco, California, U.S.	
128	Draw	92–12–23 (1)	Lupe Cordoza	PTS	10	26 Feb 1940	Coliseum Bowl, San Francisco, California, U.S.	
127	Win	92–12–22 (1)	Henry Hook	PTS	10	30 Jan 1940	San Jose Civic Auditorium, San Jose, California, U.S.	
126	Win	91–12–22 (1)	Small Montana	PTS	10	10 Jan 1940	Oakland Auditorium, Oakland, California, U.S.	
125	Win	90–12–22 (1)	Jackie Jurich	KO	10 (10)	8 Dec 1939	Hollywood Legion Stadium, Hollywood, California, U.S.	Won vacant American flyweight title
124	Draw	89–12–22 (1)	Tony Olivera	PTS	10	1 Nov 1939	Oakland Auditorium, Oakland, California, U.S.	
123	Win	89–12–21 (1)	Henry Hook	PTS	10	20 Oct 1939	Watsonville Civic Auditorium, Watsonville, California, U.S.	
122	Win	88–12–21 (1)	Tommy Cobb	PTS	10	29 Sep 1939	lWatsonville Civic Auditorium, Watsonville, California, U.S.	
121	Win	87–12–21 (1)	Elwood Romero	PTS	10	29 Aug 1939	Stockton Memorial Civic Auditorium, Stockton, California, U.S.	
120	Win	86–12–21 (1)	Cyril Joseph	PTS	10	11 Aug 1939	Watsonville Civic Auditorium, Watsonville, California, U.S.	
119	Win	85–12–21 (1)	Horace Mann	PTS	10	28 Jul 1939	Watsonville Civic Auditorium, Watsonville, California, U.S.	
118	Loss	84–12–21 (1)	Louis Salica	PTS	10	19 May 1939	Hollywood Legion Stadium, Hollywood, California, U.S.	
117	Win	84–11–21 (1)	Tommy Cobb	PTS	10	5 May 1939	Watsonville Civic Auditorium, Watsonville, California, U.S.	
116	Win	83–11–21 (1)	Cris Crispin	PTS	8	31 Mar 1939	Honolulu Civic Auditorium, Honolulu, Hawaii, U.S.	
115	Win	82–11–21 (1)	Cris Crispin	PTS	8	16 Dec 1938	Honolulu Civic Auditorium, Honolulu, Hawaii, U.S.	Won Hawaii State bantamweight title
114	Win	81–11–21 (1)	Gilbert Murakami	KO	1 (8)	12 Nov 1938	Volcano Arena, Hilo, Hawaii, U.S.	
113	Win	80–11–21 (1)	Benny Dawson	PTS	8	10 Sep 1938	Volcano Arena, Hilo, Hawaii, U.S.	
112	Win	79–11–21 (1)	Adolph Samuels	PTS	8	13 Aug 1938	Volcano Arena, Hilo, Hawaii, U.S.	
111	Win	78–11–21 (1)	Benny Dawson	PTS	8	17 Jun 1938	Honolulu Civic Auditorium, Honolulu, Hawaii, U.S.	
110	Draw	77–11–21 (1)	Henry Moreno	PTS	6	25 Mar 1938	Honolulu Civic Auditorium, Honolulu, Hawaii, U.S.	
109	NC	77–11–20 (1)	Henry Moreno	NC	9 (10)	4 Mar 1938	Honolulu Civic Auditorium, Honolulu, Hawaii, U.S.	Both fighters were tossed for putting up a poor effort
108	Win	77–11–20	José Villanueva	KO	10 (?)	18 Dec 1937	Osmena Park, Manila, Philippines	
107	Win	76–11–20	Joe Velasco	PTS	10	23 Oct 1937	Manila, Metro Manila, Philippines	
106	Win	75–11–20	Eugène Huat	PTS	10	5 Jun 1937	Rizal Stadium, Manila, Philippines	
105	Win	74–11–20	Cris Pineda	PTS	10	3 Apr 1937	Rizal Stadium, Manila, Philippines	
104	Win	73–11–20	Clever Sison	TKO	11 (?)	6 Mar 1937	Rizal Stadium, Manila, Philippines	
103	Win	72–11–20	Henry Jackson	PTS	10	30 Jan 1937	Rizal Stadium, Manila, Philippines	
102	Win	71–11–20	Little Dado	TD	12 (12)	19 Dec 1936	Manila, Metro Manila, Philippines	
101	Win	70–11–20	José Villanueva	PTS	10	14 Nov 1936	Rizal Stadium, Manila, Philippines	
100	Win	69–11–20	Little Nene	PTS	10	17 Oct 1936	Baguio, Benguet, Philippines	
99	Win	68–11–20	Ventura Marquez	PTS	4	3 Oct 1936	Rizal Stadium, Manila, Philippines	
98	Win	67–11–20	Little Dado	PTS	10	19 Jul 1936	Bacolod, Negros Occidental, Philippines	
97	Win	66–11–20	Joe Mendiola	PTS	8	4 Jul 1936	Iloilo City, Iloilo, Philippines	
96	Draw	65–11–20	Little Dado	PTS	15	6 Jun 1936	Rizal Memorial Stadium, Manila, Philippines	For vacant Orient flyweight title
95	Win	65–11–19	Little Dado	PTS	12	16 May 1936	Rizal Memorial Stadium, Manila, Philippines	
94	Win	64–11–19	Umio Gen	PTS	10	9 May 1936	Rizal Memorial Stadium, Manila, Philippines	
93	Loss	63–11–19	Cris Pineda	PTS	12	18 Apr 1936	Rizal Memorial Stadium, Philippines	Lost Orient bantamweight title
92	Draw	63–10–19	Cris Pineda	PTS	12	29 Feb 1936	Rizal Memorial Stadium, Manila, Philippines	
91	Draw	63–10–18	Buenaventura De Guzman	PTS	12	8 Feb 1936	Laguna Stadium, San Pablo, Philippines	
90	Win	63–10–17	Joe Mendiola	PTS	12	18 Jan 1936	Rizal Memorial Stadium, Manila, Philippines	Won Oriental bantamweight title
89	Loss	62–10–17	Buenaventura De Guzman	PTS	12	14 Dec 1935	Rizal Memorial Stadium, Manila, Philippines	Lost Orient junior featherweight title
88	Win	62–9–17	Joe Mendiola	PTS	12	16 Nov 1935	Rizal Memorial Stadium, Manila, Philippines	Retained Orient bantamweight title
87	Win	61–9–17	Star Frisco	PTS	12	19 Oct 1935	Rizal Memorial Stadium, Manila, Philippines	Retained Orient bantamweight title
86	Draw	60–9–17	Buenaventura De Guzman	PTS	15	17 Aug 1935	Rizal Memorial Stadium, Manila, Philippines	
85	Win	60–9–16	Joe Eagle	PTS	12	6 Jul 1935	Rizal Memorial Stadium, Manila, Philippines	Won Orient Junit featherweight title
84	Draw	59–9–16	Buenaventura De Guzman	PTS	12	15 Jun 1935	Rizal Memorial Stadium, Manila, Philippines	
83	Win	59–9–15	Rush Montano	PTS	10	1 May 1935	Bacolod, Negros Occidental, Philippines	
82	Win	58–9–15	José Villanueva	PTS	10	6 Apr 1935	Lyric Boxing Stadium, Iloilo City, Philippines	
81	Win	57–9–15	Lew Farber	PTS	10	16 Feb 1935	Rizal Memorial Stadium, Manila, Philippines	Retained Orient bantamweight title
80	Win	56–9–15	Speedy Cabanela	PTS	12	2 Feb 1935	Rizal Memorial Stadium, Manila, Philippines	Retained Orient bantamweight title
79	Win	55–9–15	Star Frisco	PTS	12	29 Dec 1934	Rizal Memorial Stadium, Manila, Philippines	Won vacant Orient bantamweight title
78	Win	54–9–15	Georgie Goodman	TKO	3 (10)	26 Oct 1934	Watsonville Civic Auditorium, Watsonville, California, U.S.	
77	Win	53–9–15	Augie Curtis	PTS	10	5 Oct 1934	Pismo Beach Arena, Pismo Beach, California, U.S.	
76	Win	52–9–15	Matty Matthewson	PTS	10	5 Sep 1934	Oakland Auditorium, California, Oakland, U.S.	
75	Win	51–9–15	Al Romero	KO	2 (10)	30 Aug 1934	Forman's Arena, San Jose, U.S.	
74	Win	50–9–15	Jess LaBarba	TKO	2 (8)	1 Aug 1934	Oakland Auditorium, Oakland, U.S.	
73	Draw	49–9–15	Lew Farber	PTS	10	15 Jun 1934	Watsonville Civic Auditorium, Watsonville, California, U.S.	
72	Win	49–9–14	Augie Ruggierre	PTS	10	8 May 1934	Forman's Arena, San Jose, California, U.S.	
71	Win	48–9–14	Matty Matthewson	PTS	10	1 May 1934	Forman's Arena, San Jose, California, U.S.	
70	Draw	47–9–14	Pablo Dano	PTS	10	9 Mar 1939	Pismo Beach Arena, Pismo Beach, California, U.S.	
69	Win	47–9–13	Frankie Genaro	RTD	8 (10)	21 Feb 1934	Oakland Auditorium, Oakland, California, U.S.	
68	Win	46–9–13	Joe Tei Ken	PTS	10	7 Feb 1934	Oakland Auditorium, Oakland, California, U.S.	
67	Win	45–9–13	Pablo Dano	PTS	10	17 Jan 1934	Dreamland Auditorium, San Francisco, California, U.S.	
66	Win	44–9–13	Augie Curtis	PTS	10	28 Nov 1933	Seattle Crystal Pool, Seattle, Washington, U.S.	
65	Draw	43–9–13	Augie Curtis	MD	8	21 Nov 1933	Seattle Crystal Pool, Seattle, Washington, U.S.	
64	Win	43–9–12	Dude McCook	KO	4 (10)	27 Oct 1933	Bakersfield Arena, Bakersfield, California, U.S.	
63	Loss	42–9–12	Joe Tei Ken	PTS	10	4 Sep 1933	Pismo Beach Arena, Pismo Beach, California, U.S.	
62	Win	42–8–12	Eddie Ceresole	PTS	10	16 Aug 1933	Chestnut St. Arena, Reno, Nevada, U.S.	
61	Draw	41–8–12	Gene Bianco	PTS	10	11 Aug 1933	Dreamland Auditorium, San Francisco, California, U.S.	
60	Draw	41–8–11	Harry Fierro	PTS	10	28 Jul 1933	Stockton, California, U.S.	
59	Win	41–8–10	Young Sport	PTS	10	10 May 1933	Golden Gate Arena,San Francisco, California, U.S.	
58	Win	40–8–10	Billy McLeod	PTS	10	5 Apr 1933	Oakland Auditorium, Oakland, California, U.S.	
57	Win	39–8–10	Joe Tei Ken	PTS	10	29 Mar 1933	Oakland Auditorium, Oakland, California, U.S.	
56	Loss	38–8–10	Harry Fierro	PTS	10	24 Feb 1933	Hollywood Legion Stadium, Hollywood, California, U.S.	
55	Win	38–7–10	Bobby Leitham	PTS	10	31 Jan 1933	Los Angeles Olympic Auditorium, Los Angeles, California, U.S.	
54	Win	37–7–10	Ernie Hood	PTS	10	31 Dec 1932	Pismo Beach Arena, Pismo Beach, California, U.S.	
53	Loss	36–7–10	Eugène Huat	PTS	10	15 Dec 1932	Sacramento Memorial Auditorium, Sacramento, California, U.S.	
52	Win	36–6–10	Tatsuro Uemura	PTS	10	28 Oct 1932	Houston Arena, Honolulu, Hawaii, U.S.	
51	Win	35–6–10	Benny Gallup	PTS	10	29 Jul 1932	Stockton, California, U.S.	
50	Draw	34–6–10	Joe Tei Ken	PTS	10	2 Jul 1932	Moreing Field, Sacramento, California U.S.	
49	Win	34–6–9	Freddy Buck	PTS	6	3 Jun 1932	Houston Arena, Honolulu, Hawaii, U.S.	
48	Win	33–6–9	Johnny Yasui	PFS	8	14 May 1932	Wailuku Stadium, Wailuku, Hawaii, U.S.	
47	Win	32–6–9	Sailor Ray Butler	PTS	10	7 May 1932	Volcano Arena, Hilo, Hawaii, U.S.	
46	Draw	31–6–9	Midget Wolgast	SD	10	15 Apr 1932	Honolulu Stadium, Honolulu, Hawaii, U.S.	
45	Win	31–6–8	Sadato 'KO' Kuratsu	PTS	6	9 Apr 1932	Lihue Armory, Lihue, Hawaii, U.S.	
44	Loss	30–6–8	Midget Wolgast	UD	10	18 Mar 1932	Honolulu Stadium, Honolulu, Hawaii, U.S.	
43	Win	30–5–8	Joe Mosquindo	PTS	12	30 Jan 1932	Manila Olympic Stadium, Manila, Philippines	
42	Win	29–5–8	Joe Mosquindo	PTS	10	13 Jan 1932	Philippines	
41	Win	28–5–8	Johnny Gabucco	PTS	12	26 Dec 1931	Manila, Metro Manila, Philippines	
40	Win	27–5–8	Henry Kudo	PTS	12	21 Nov 1931	Manila, Metro Manila, Philippines	
39	Win	26–5–8	Joe Tiger Connell	PTS	15	31 Oct 1931	Manila, Metro Manila, Philippines	
38	Win	25–5–8	Joe Tiger Connell	PTS	12	5 Sep 1931	Manila Olympic Stadium, Manila, Philippines	
37	Win	24–5–8	Rush Montano	KO	3 (?)	16 Jul 1931	Philippines	
36	Win	23–5–8	Tony Sacramento	PTS	12	11 Jul 1931	Manila, Metro Manila, Philippines	
35	Win	22–5–8	Pablo Dano	PTS	12	9 May 1931	Manila, Metro Manila, Philippines	Won vacant Orient flyweight title
34	Win	21–5–8	Little Joe Rivers	TKO	2 (?)	12 Mar 1931	Manila, Metro Manila, Philippines	
33	Win	20–5–8	Young Tommy	PTS	12	31 Jan 1931	Manila, Metro Manila, Philippines	
32	Draw	19–5–8	Pablo Dano	PTS	12	22 Nov 1930	Manila, Metro Manila, Philippines	
31	Draw	19–5–7	Pablo Dano	PTS	12	18 Oct 1930	Manila, Metro Manila, Philippines	
30	Win	19–5–6	Young Firpo	PTS	12	7 Jun 1930	Manila, Metro Manila, Philippines	
29	Win	18–5–6	Joe Alexander	KO	9 (?)	10 May 1930	Manila, Metro Manila, Philippines	
28	Draw	17–5–6	Young Tommy	PTS	12	1 Mar 1930	Manila Olympic Stadium, Manila, Philippines	
27	Draw	17–5–5	Joe Mendiola	PTS	12	23 Nov 1929	Manila, Metro Manila, Philippines	
26	Win	17–5–4	Joe Alexander	PTS	12	5 Oct 1929	Manila, Metro Manila, Philippines	
25	Loss	16–5–4	Little Moro	KO	9 (?)	3 Aug 1929	Manila, Metro Manila, Philippines	
24	Loss	16–4–4	Young Firpo	PTS	12	22 Jun 1929	Manila, Metro Manila, Philippines	
23	Draw	16–3–4	Young Tommy	PTS	12	1 Jun 1929	Manila Olympic Stadium, Manila, Philippines	
22	Win	16–3–3	Kid Dencio	PTS	12	4 May 1929	Manila Olympic Stadium, Manila, Philippines	
21	Win	15–3–3	Joe Mendiola	PTS	12	13 Apr 1929	Manila, Metro Manila, Philippines	
20	Win	14–3–3	Rush Rios	PTS	8	5 Apr 1929	Philippines	
19	Win	13–3–3	Kid Gabo	PTS	8	30 Mar 1929	Manila, Metro Manila, Philippines	
18	Draw	12–3–3	Kid Balagtas	PTS	8	9 Feb 1929	Manila Olympic Stadium, Manila, Philippines	
17	Win	12–3–2	Young Tony	PTS	8	19 Jan 1929	Manila, Metro Manila, Philippines	
16	Win	11–3–2	Young Tony	PTS	8	29 Dec 1928	Manila Olympic Stadium, Manila, Philippines	
15	Win	10–3–2	Young Tony	PTS	8	1 Dec 1928	Manila Olympic Stadium, Manila, Philippines	
14	Win	9–3–2	Kid Bondad	PTS	8	31 Oct 1928	Philippines	
13	Win	8–3–2	Kid Balagtas	PTS	8	27 Oct 1928	Manila, Metro Manila, Philippines	
12	Loss	7–3–2	Cris Pineda	PTS	6	29 Sep 1928	Manila, Metro Manila, Philippines	
11	Loss	7–2–2	Joe Mendiola	PTS	8	25 Aug 1928	Manila, Metro Manila, Philippines	
10	Draw	7–1–2	Joe Mendiola	PTS	8	21 Jul 1928	Manila, Metro Manila, Philippines	
9	Draw	7–1–1	Kid Gabo	PTS	8	2 Jun 1928	Manila, Metro Manila, Philippines	
8	Win	7–1	Frank De Vera	PTS	6	31 Mar 1928	Manila Olympic Stadium, Manila, Philippines	
7	Loss	6–1	Kid Balagtas	PTS	6	3 Mar 1928	Manila, Metro Manila, Philippines	
6	Win	6–0	Pedro Sibug	PTS	6	31 Dec 1927	Manila Olympic Stadium, Manila, Philippines	
5	Win	5–0	Kid Castillo	PTS	4	24 Dec 1927	Manila Olympic Stadium, Manila, Philippines	
4	Win	4–0	Joe Ticon	PTS	4	3 Dec 1927	Manila Olympic Stadium, Manila, Philippines	
3	Win	3–0	Little Ladaga	PTS	4	5 Nov 1927	Manila Olympic Stadium, Manila, Philippines	
2	Win	2–0	Kid Estrella	PTS	4	15 Oct 1927	Manila Olympic Stadium, Manila, Philippines	
1	Win	1–0	Fighting Joe	PTS	?	1 Oct 1927	Manila Olympic Stadium, Manila, Philippines	

== Career rankings ==
As of June 2024, Little Pancho is ranked as No. 17 in all Filipino boxers ratings BoxRec, and he is also ranked No. 58 in all flyweight boxers rankings, however, there are no recorded ranking of him prior to his career years yet.

== Life after boxing ==
After boxing, He served in the United States army during World War II.

== See also ==
- List of male boxers
- List of flyweight boxing champions

== Links ==
- Boxing record for Little Pancho from BoxRec (registration required)
