= Little Dado =

Filipino boxer

Personal information
- Nationality: Filipino
- Born: Eleuterio Zapanta; January 1, 1916 La Carlota, Negros Occidental, Philippines
- Died: July 7, 1965 (aged 49)
- Weight: Flyweight; Bantamweight

Boxing career
- Stance: Orthodox

Boxing record
- Total fights: 90
- Wins: 73 (1 NWS)
- Win by KO: 22
- Losses: 6
- Draws: 11
- No contests: 0

Eleuterio Zapanta (nicknamed Little Dado; January 1, 1916 – July 7, 1965) was a flyweight boxer from the Philippines, who became World bantamweight champion in 1940 and World flyweight champion in 1941.

== Professional career ==
Little Dado was one of the top flyweight and bantamweight boxers in the world during the late 1930s and early 1940s. From 1938 until the end of his career in 1943, Dado was ranked in the top five in the flyweight division by The Ring magazine, attaining the No. 1 rating in 1939, at a time when the title was deemed vacant by The Ring.

During his prime, Dado held both the world flyweight and bantamweight titles, receiving recognition in California. He expressed a desire to win the featherweight title, hoping to become the second boxer to hold three different world titles simultaneously.

== Professional boxing record ==
=== Official record ===
89 fights	70 wins	7 losses
By knockout	22	1
By decision	48	6
Draws	11	
Newspaper decisions/draws	1	

All newspaper decisions are officially regarded as “no decision” bouts and are not counted in the win/loss/draw column.

No.	Result	Record	Opponent	Type	Round, Time	Date	Location	Notes
89	Loss	70–7–11 (1)	(China) David Kui Kong Young	TKO	8 (12), 2:32	4 Jul 1943	(United States) Honolulu Stadium, Honolulu	For vacant NYSAC bantamweight title
88	Win	70–6–11 (1)	(Puerto Rico) Quentin Hernandez	KO	1 (10), 2:50	14 Mar 1943	(United States) Civic Auditorium, Honolulu	
87	Win	69–6–11 (1)	(United States) Adolph Samuels	PTS	10	8 Nov 1942	(United States) Civic Auditorium, Honolulu	
86	Win	68–6–11 (1)	(United States) Joho Shimira	PTS	10	5 Dec 1941	(United States) Civic Auditorium, Honolulu	
85	Loss	67–6–11 (1)	(China) David Kui Kong Young	UD	10	11 Aug 1941	(United States) Honolulu Stadium, Honolulu	
84	Win	67–5–11 (1)	(United States) Nat Corum	PTS	10	9 May 1941	(United States) Civic Auditorium, Honolulu	
83	Loss	66–5–11 (1)	(China) David Kui Kong Young	UD	10	4 Apr 1941	(United States) Honolulu Stadium, Honolulu	
82	Win	66–4–11 (1)	(United States) Jackie Jurich	PTS	10	21 Feb 1941	(United States) Civic Auditorium, Honolulu	Retained NBA flyweight title
81	Win	65–4–11 (1)	(United States) Tony Olivera	PTS	10	24 Jan 1941	(United States) Civic Auditorium, Honolulu	
80	Win	64–4–11 (1)	(Canada) Kenny Lindsay	PTS	10	29 Nov 1940	(United States) Civic Auditorium, Watsonville	NBA flyweight title not at stake as both boxers were overweight
79	Win	63–4–11 (1)	(United States) Nat Corum	PTS	10	21 Oct 1940	(United States) Coliseum Bowl, San Francisco	
78	Win	62–4–11 (1)	(Cuba) Rio Rico	KO	2 (8)	11 Oct 1940	(United States) Civic Auditorium, Watsonville	
77	Win	61–4–11 (1)	(United States) Olin Loy	TKO	9 (10), 0:40	2 Sep 1940	(United States) Pismo Beach Arena, Pismo Beach	
76	Win	60–4–11 (1)	(United States) Nick De Posta	TKO	6 (8)	30 Aug 1940	(United States) Civic Auditorium, Watsonville	
75	Draw	59–4–11 (1)	(United States) Nat Corum	PTS	10	13 Aug 1940	(United States) Civic Auditorium, San Jose	
74	Win	59–4–10 (1)	(United States) Jackie Jurich	NWS	12	30 Jul 1940	(United States) Civic Auditorium, San Jose	
73	Draw	59–4–10	(Philippines) Little Pancho	PTS	10	17 Jun 1940	(United States) Civic Auditorium, San Francisco	Retained NBA flyweight title
72	Win	59–4–9	(United States) Henry Hook	TKO	4 (10)	10 May 1940	(United States) Pismo Beach Arena, Pismo Beach	Hook was stopped due to a cut on his right eye.
71	Win	58–4–9	(United States) Tony Olivera	PTS	10	24 Apr 1940	(United States) Auditorium, Oakland	Won vacant NYSAC bantamweight title
70	Draw	57–4–9	(United States) Tony Olivera	PTS	10	28 Feb 1940	(United States) Auditorium, Oakland	
69	Draw	57–4–8	(United States) Manuel Ortiz	PTS	10	30 Jan 1940	(United States) Memorial Civic Auditorium, Stockton	
68	Win	57–4–7	(United States) Horace Mann	TKO	7 (10)	12 Jan 1940	(United States) Legion Stadium, Hollywood	According to the Los Angeles Times, Mann quits after he claimed that Dado had thumbed him in the right eye.
67	Win	56–4–7	(United States) Horace Mann	TKO	2 (10)	15 Dec 1939	(United States) Civic Auditorium, Watsonville	
66	Win	55–4–7	(United States) Henry Hook	TKO	3 (10), 1:40	28 Nov 1939	(United States) Memorial Civic Auditorium, Stockton	
65	Win	54–4–7	(United States) Henry Hook	PTS	10	17 Nov 1939	(United States) Civic Auditorium, Watsonville	
64	Draw	53–4–7	(United States) Louis Salica	PTS	10	20 Oct 1939	(United States) Legion Stadium, Hollywood	
63	Draw	53–4–6	(United States) Jackie Jurich	PTS	10	22 Sep 1939	(United States) Legion Stadium, Hollywood	
62	Win	53–4–5	(South Africa) Jimmy Webster	PTS	10	23 Aug 1939	(United States) Auditorium, Oakland	
61	Win	52–4–5	(United States) Joey Rosenberg	KO	3 (10), 1:32	14 Jul 1939	(United States) Legion Stadium, Hollywood	
60	Win	51–4–5	(United States) Tomy Souza	KO	3 (10)	7 Jul 1939	(United States) Civic Auditorium, Watsonville	
59	Win	50–4–5	(United States) Louis Salica	PTS	10	16 Jun 1939	(United States) Legion Stadium, Hollywood	
58	Win	49–4–5	(United States) Tommy Cobb	TKO	9 (12)	2 Jun 1939	(United States) Civic Auditorium, Watsonville	Defended CSAC bantamweight title
57	Win	48–4–5	(United States) Bobby Wright	TKO	8 (10)	26 May 1939	(United States) Pismo Beach Arena, Pismo Beach	
56	Draw	47–4–5	(United States) Louis Salica	PTS	10	1 Mar 1949	(United States) Auditorium, Oakland	
55	Win	47–4–4	(United States) Young Joe Roche	PTS	10	31 Jan 1939	(United States) Memorial Civic Auditorium, Stockton	Defended CSAC bantamweight title
54	Win	46–4–4	(Philippines) Small Montana	PTS	10	30 Nov 1938	(United States) Auditorium, Oakland	Won NYSAC and American flyweight titles
53	Win	45–4–4	(United States) Olin Loy	PTS	10	25 Oct 1938	(United States) Memorial Civic Auditorium, Stockton	Defended CSAC bantamweight title
52	Win	44–4–4	(United States) Jimmy (Babe) McCusker	PTS	10	20 Sep 1938	(United States) Memorial Civic Auditorium, Stockton	Won CSAC bantamweight title
51	Win	43–4–4	(United States) Olin Loy	PTS	10	19 Aug 1938	(United States) Pismo Beach Arena, Pismo Beach	
50	Win	42–4–4	(United States) Donnie Maes	PTS	10	28 Jun 1938	(United States) Memorial Auditorium, Sacramento	
49	Win	41–4–4	(United States) Young Joe Roche	PTS	10	18 May 1938	(United States) Auditorium, Oakland	
48	Win	40–4–4	(United States) Horace Mann	TKO	4 (10), 1:35	3 May 1938	(United States) Olympic Auditorium, Los Angeles	
47	Win	39–4–4	(United States) Tony Ramirez	KO	2 (10), 2:57	26 Apr 1938	(United States) Olympic Auditorium, Los Angeles	
46	Draw	38–4–4	(United States) Donnie Maes	PTS	10	23 Mar 1938	(United States) Auditorium, Oakland	
45	Win	38–4–3	(United States) Jackie Jurich	PTS	10	2 Mar 1938	(United States) Auditorium, Oakland	
44	Win	37–4–3	(United States) Little Caesar	KO	2 (10)	18 Jan 1938	(United States) Memorial Civic Auditorium, Stockton	
43	Win	36–4–3	(United States) Horace Mann	KO	1 (10), 2:26	1 Jan 1938	(United States) Memorial Civic Auditorium, Stockton	
42	Win	35–4–3	(United States) Tony Ramirez	TKO	6 (10)	21 Dec 1937	(United States) Civic Auditorium, San Jose	
41	Win	34–4–3	(United States) Tommy Cobb	TKO	6 (10)	30 Nov 1937	(United States) Stockton, California	
40	Win	33–4–3	(United States) Joey Rosenberg	PTS	8	14 Oct 1937	(United States) Civic Auditorium, Honolulu	
39	Draw	32–4–3	(Philippines) Small Montana	PTS	10	27 Aug 1937	(United States) Civic Auditorium, Honolulu	
38	Win	32–4–2	(United States) Tommy Cobb	KO	4 (10), 2:15	16 Jul 1937	(United States) Civic Auditorium, Honolulu	
37	Win	31–4–2	(United States) Tommy Cobb	TKO	2 (8)	19 Jun 1937	(United States) Armory, Lihue	
36	Win	30–4–2	(United States) Jackie Jurich	PTS	10	4 Jun 1937	(United States) Civic Auditorium, Honolulu	
35	Win	29–4–2	(United States) Augie Curtis	PTS	10	9 Apr 1937	(United States) Civic Auditorium, Honolulu	
34	Loss	28–4–2	(Philippines) Little Pancho	TD	12	19 Dec 1936	(Philippines) Osmena Park, Manila	
33	Loss	28–3–2	(Philippines) Little Pancho	PTS	10	19 Jul 1936	(Philippines) Bacolod, Negros Occidental	
32	Draw	28–2–2	(Philippines) Little Pancho	PTS	15	6 Jun 1936	(Philippines) Rizal Memorial Coliseum, Manila	For Orient flyweight title
31	Loss	28–2–1	(Philippines) Little Pancho	PTS	12	16 May 1939	(Philippines) Rizal Memorial Coliseum, Manila	
30	Win	28–1–1	(Japan) Yoichiro Hanada	PTS	10	2 May 1936	(Philippines) Rizal Memorial Coliseum, Manila	
29	Win	27–1–1	(Philippines) Small Doro	PTS	10	4 Apr 1936	(Philippines) Iloilo City, Iloilo	
28	Win	26–1–1	(Philippines) Joe Brazil	PTS	10	29 Feb 1936	(Philippines) Iloilo City, Iloilo	
27	Win	25–1–1	(United States) Speedy Cabanela	PTS	10	4 Jan 1935	(Philippines) Bacolod City, Negros Occidental	
26	Win	24–1–1	(United States) Johnny Mortell	PTS	10	23 Dec 1935	(Philippines) Bacolod City, Negros Occidental	
25	Win	23–1–1	(Philippines) Speedy Cabanela	PTS	12	28 Sep 1935	(Philippines) Rizal Memorial Coliseum, Manila	Won Orient flyweight title
24	Win	22–1–1	(Philippines) OK Cruz	PTS	10	31 Aug 1935	(Philippines) Bacolod City, Negros Occidental	
23	Win	21–1–1	(United States) Augie Curtis	PTS	10	8 Jun 1935	(Philippines) Bacolod City, Negros Occidental	
22	Win	20–1–1	(Philippines) Kid Pacana	PTS	10	4 May 1935	(Philippines) Olympic Stadium, Bacolod	Won Orient junior bantamweight title
21	Win	19–1–1	(Philippines) Kid Agustin	PTS	10	23 Mar 1935	(Philippines) Bacolod City, Negros Occidental	
20	Win	18–1–1	(Philippines) Rocky Montano	PTS	10	2 Mar 1935	(Philippines) Cavite City, Cavite	
19	Win	17–1–1	(Philippines) James Eagle	PTS	10	19 Jan 1935	(Philippines) Rizal Memorial Coliseum, Manila	
18	Win	16–1–1	(United States) Johnny Mortell	PTS	10	29 Dec 1934	(Philippines) Rizal Memorial Coliseum, Manila	
17	Win	15-0-1	(United States) Johnny Mortell	PTS	6	1 Dec 1934	(Philippines) Rizal Memorial Coliseum, Manila	
16	Win	14–1–1	(Philippines) Small Doro	PTS	6	10 Nov 1934	(Philippines) Rizal Memorial Coliseum, Manila	
15	Win	13–1–1	(Philippines) Small Doro	PTS	10	3 Oct 1934	(Philippines) Stadium, Mandaluyong	
14	Win	12–1–1	(Philippines) Rush Medina	PTS	8	18 Aug 1934	(Philippines) Stadium, Mandaluyong	
13	Win	11–1–1	(Philippines) Rush Medina	TKO	6 (8)	7 Jul 1934	(Philippines) La Loma Stadium, Quezon City	
12	Win	10–1–1	(Philippines) Dan Viranda	PTS	8	3 Feb 1934	(Philippines) Olympic Stadium, Manila	
11	Win	9–1–1	(Philippines) Joe Brazil	PTS	8	20 Jan 1934	(Philippines) Olympic Stadium, Manila	
10	Win	8–1–1	(Philippines) Rush Medina	PTS	8	9 Dec 1933	(Philippines) Olympic Stadium, Manila	
9	Win	7–1–1	(Philippines) Small Doro	PTS	6	11 Nov 1933	(Philippines) Manila, Metro Manila	
8	Win	6–1–1	(Philippines) Tony Gorilla	PTS	4	9 Sep 1933	(Philippines) Manila, Metro Manila	
7	Win	5–1–1	(Philippines) Little Javier	PTS	?	9 Sep 1933	Silanganan Stadium, Santa Cruz	
6	Win	4–1–1	(Philippines) Little Bagnoy	PTS	4	1 Jul 1933	(Philippines) Manila, Metro Manila	
5	Win	3–1–1	(Philippines) Pendio Vinia	PTS	6	10 Mar 1933	(Philippines) Navy Yard Cavite City	
4	Loss	2–1–1	(Philippines) Max Moro	PTS	4	28 Jan 1933	(Philippines) Manila, Metro Manila	
3	Win	2–0–1	(Philippines) Pendio Vinia	PTS	4	24 Dec 1932	(Philippines) Pasay City, Metro Manila	
2	Win	1–0–1	(Philippines) David Dencio	PTS	4	3 Sep 1932	(Philippines) Manila, Metro Manila	
1	Draw	0–0–1	(Philippines) Frankie Librado	PTS	4	24 Aug 1932	(Philippines) ???	

=== Unofficial record ===
89 fights	71 wins	7 losses
By knockout	22	1
By decision	49	6
Draws	11	

Record with the inclusion of newspaper decisions in the win/loss/draw column.

No.	Result	Record	Opponent	Type	Round, Time	Date	Location	Notes
89	Loss	71–7–11	(China) David Kui Kong Young	TKO	8 (12), 2:32	4 Jul 1943	(United States) Honolulu Stadium, Honolulu	For vacant NYSAC bantamweight title
88	Win	71–6–11	(Puerto Rico) Quentin Hernandez	KO	1 (10), 2:50	14 Mar 194	(United States) Civic Auditorium, Honolulu	
87	Win	70–6–11	(United States) Adolph Samuels	PTS	10	8 Nov 1942	(United States) Civic Auditorium, Honolulu	
86	Win	68–6–11	(United States) Joho Shimira	PTS	10	5 Dec 1941	(United States) Civic Auditorium, Honolulu	
85	Loss	68–6–11	(China) David Kui Kong Young	UD	10	11 Aug 1941	(United States) Honolulu Stadium, Honolulu	
84	Win	68–5–11	(United States) Nat Corum	PTS	10	9 May 1941	(United States) Civic Auditorium, Honolulu	
83	Loss	67–5–11	(China) David Kui Kong Young	UD	10	4 Apr 1941	(United States) Honolulu Stadium, Honolulu	
82	Win	67–4–11	(United States) Jackie Jurich	PTS	10	21 Feb 1941	(United States) Civic Auditorium, Honolulu	Retained NBA flyweight title
81	Win	66–4–11	(United States) Tony Olivera	PTS	10	24 Jan 1941	(United States) Civic Auditorium, Honolulu	
80	Win	65–4–11	(Canada) Kenny Lindsay	PTS	10	29 Nov 1940	(United States) Civic Auditorium, Watsonville	NBA flyweight title not at stake as both boxers were overweight
79	Win	64–4–11	(United States) Nat Corum	PTS	10	21 Oct 1940	(United States) Coliseum Bowl, San Francisco	
78	Win	63–4–11	(Cuba) Rio Rico	KO	2 (8)	11 Oct 1940	(United States) Civic Auditorium, Watsonville	
77	Win	62–4–11	(United States) Olin Loy	TKO	9 (10), 0:40	2 Sep 1940	(United States) Pismo Beach Arena, Pismo Beach	
76	Win	61–4–11	(United States) Nick De Posta	TKO	6 (8)	30 Aug 1940	(United States) Civic Auditorium, Watsonville	
75	Draw	60–4–11	(United States) Nat Corum	PTS	10	13 Aug 1940	(United States) Civic Auditorium, San Jose	
74	Win	60–4–10	(United States) Jackie Jurich	NWS	12	30 Jul 1940	(United States) Civic Auditorium, San Jose	Newspaper decision Provided by the Oakland Tribune and San Jose News.
73	Draw	59–4–10	(Philippines) Little Pancho	PTS	10	17 Jun 1940	(United States) Civic Auditorium, San Francisco	Retained NBA flyweight title
72	Win	59–4–9	(United States) Henry Hook	TKO	4 (10)	10 May 1940	(United States) Pismo Beach Arena, Pismo Beach	Hook was stopped due to a cut on his right eye.
71	Win	58–4–9	(United States) Tony Olivera	PTS	10	24 Apr 1940	(United States) Auditorium, Oakland	Won vacant NYSAC bantamweight title
70	Draw	57–4–9	(United States) Tony Olivera	PTS	10	28 Feb 1940	(United States) Auditorium, Oakland	
69	Draw	57–4–8	(United States) Manuel Ortiz	PTS	10	30 Jan 1940	(United States) Memorial Civic Auditorium, Stockton	
68	Win	57–4–7	(United States) Horace Mann	TKO	7 (10)	12 Jan 1940	(United States) Legion Stadium, Hollywood	According to the Los Angeles Times, Mann quits after he claimed that Dado had thumbed him in the right eye.
67	Win	56–4–7	(United States) Horace Mann	TKO	2 (10)	15 Dec 1939	(United States) Civic Auditorium, Watsonville	
66	Win	55–4–7	(United States) Henry Hook	TKO	3 (10), 1:40	28 Nov 1939	(United States) Memorial Civic Auditorium, Stockton	
65	Win	54–4–7	(United States) Henry Hook	PTS	10	17 Nov 1939	(United States) Civic Auditorium, Watsonville	
64	Draw	53–4–7	(United States) Louis Salica	PTS	10	20 Oct 1939	(United States) Legion Stadium, Hollywood	
63	Draw	53–4–6	(United States) Jackie Jurich	PTS	10	22 Sep 1939	(United States) Legion Stadium, Hollywood	
62	Win	53–4–5	(South Africa) Jimmy Webster	PTS	10	23 Aug 1939	(United States) Auditorium, Oakland	
61	Win	52–4–5	(United States) Joey Rosenberg	KO	3 (10), 1:32	14 Jul 1939	(United States) Legion Stadium, Hollywood	
60	Win	51–4–5	(United States) Tomy Souza	KO	3 (10)	7 Jul 1939	(United States) Civic Auditorium, Watsonville	
59	Win	50–4–5	(United States) Louis Salica	PTS	10	16 Jun 1939	(United States) Legion Stadium, Hollywood	
58	Win	49–4–5	(United States) Tommy Cobb	TKO	9 (12)	2 Jun 1939	(United States) Civic Auditorium, Watsonville	Defended CSAC bantamweight title
57	Win	48–4–5	(United States) Bobby Wright	TKO	8 (10)	26 May 1939	(United States) Pismo Beach Arena, Pismo Beach	
56	Draw	47–4–5	(United States) Louis Salica	PTS	10	1 Mar 1949	(United States) Auditorium, Oakland	
55	Win	47–4–4	(United States) Young Joe Roche	PTS	10	31 Jan 1939	(United States) Memorial Civic Auditorium, Stockton	Defended CSAC bantamweight title
54	Win	46–4–4	(Philippines) Small Montana	PTS	10	30 Nov 1938	(United States) Auditorium, Oakland	Won NYSAC and American flyweight titles
53	Win	45–4–4	(United States) Olin Loy	PTS	10	25 Oct 1938	(United States) Memorial Civic Auditorium, Stockton	Defended CSAC bantamweight title
52	Win	44–4–4	(United States) Jimmy (Babe) McCusker	PTS	10	20 Sep 1938	(United States) Memorial Civic Auditorium, Stockton	Won CSAC bantamweight title
51	Win	43–4–4	(United States) Olin Loy	PTS	10	19 Aug 1938	(United States) Pismo Beach Arena, Pismo Beach	
50	Win	42–4–4	(United States) Donnie Maes	PTS	10	28 Jun 1938	(United States) Memorial Auditorium, Sacramento	
49	Win	41–4–4	(United States) Young Joe Roche	PTS	10	18 May 1938	(United States) Auditorium, Oakland	
48	Win	40–4–4	(United States) Horace Mann	TKO	4 (10), 1:35	3 May 1938	(United States) Olympic Auditorium, Los Angeles	
47	Win	39–4–4	(United States) Tony Ramirez	KO	2 (10), 2:57	26 Apr 1938	(United States) Olympic Auditorium, Los Angeles	
46	Draw	38–4–4	(United States) Donnie Maes	PTS	10	23 Mar 1938	(United States) Auditorium, Oakland	
45	Win	38–4–3	(United States) Jackie Jurich	PTS	10	2 Mar 1938	(United States) Auditorium, Oakland	
44	Win	37–4–3	(United States) Little Caesar	KO	2 (10)	18 Jan 1938	(United States) Memorial Civic Auditorium, Stockton	
43	Win	36–4–3	(United States) Horace Mann	KO	1 (10), 2:26	1 Jan 1938	(United States) Memorial Civic Auditorium, Stockton	
42	Win	35–4–3	(United States) Tony Ramirez	TKO	6 (10)	21 Dec 1937	(United States) Civic Auditorium, San Jose	
41	Win	34–4–3	(United States) Tommy Cobb	TKO	6 (10)	30 Nov 1937	(United States) Stockton, California	
40	Win	33–4–3	(United States) Joey Rosenberg	PTS	8	14 Oct 1937	(United States) Civic Auditorium, Honolulu	
39	Draw	32–4–3	(Philippines) Small Montana	PTS	10	27 Aug 1937	(United States) Civic Auditorium, Honolulu	
38	Win	32–4–2	(United States) Tommy Cobb	KO	4 (10), 2:15	16 Jul 1937	(United States) Civic Auditorium, Honolulu	
37	Win	31–4–2	(United States) Tommy Cobb	TKO	2 (8)	19 Jun 1937	(United States) Armory, Lihue	
36	Win	30–4–2	(United States) Jackie Jurich	PTS	10	4 Jun 1937	(United States) Civic Auditorium, Honolulu	
35	Win	29–4–2	(United States) Augie Curtis	PTS	10	9 Apr 1937	(United States) Civic Auditorium, Honolulu	
34	Loss	28–4–2	(Philippines) Little Pancho	TD	12	19 Dec 1936	(Philippines) Osmena Park, Manila	
33	Loss	28–3–2	(Philippines) Little Pancho	PTS	10	19 Jul 1936	(Philippines) Bacolod City, Negros Occidental	
32	Draw	28–2–2	(Philippines) Little Pancho	PTS	15	6 Jun 1936	(Philippines) Rizal Memorial Coliseum, Manila	For Orient flyweight title
31	Loss	28–2–1	(Philippines) Little Pancho	PTS	12	16 May 1939	(Philippines) Rizal Memorial Coliseum, Manila	
30	Win	28–1–1	(Japan) Yoichiro Hanada	PTS	10	2 May 1936	(Philippines) Rizal Memorial Coliseum, Manila	
29	Win	27–1–1	(Philippines) Small Doro	PTS	10	4 Apr 1936	(Philippines) Iloilo City, Iloilo	
28	Win	26–1–1	(Philippines) Joe Brazil	PTS	10	29 Feb 1936	(Philippines) Iloilo City, Iloilo	
27	Win	25–1–1	(United States) Speedy Cabanela	PTS	10	4 Jan 1935	(Philippines) Bacolod City, Negros Occidental	
26	Win	24–1–1	(United States) Johnny Mortell	PTS	10	23 Dec 1935	(Philippines) Bacolod City, Negros Occidental	
25	Win	23–1–1	(Philippines) Speedy Cabanela	PTS	12	28 Sep 1935	(Philippines) Rizal Memorial Coliseum, Manila	Won Orient flyweight title
24	Win	22–1–1	(Philippines) OK Cruz	PTS	10	31 Aug 1935	(Philippines) Bacolod City, Negros Occidental	
23	Win	21–1–1	(United States) Augie Curtis	PTS	10	8 Jun 1935	(Philippines) Bacolod City, Negros Occidental	
22	Win	20–1–1	(Philippines) Kid Pacana	PTS	10	4 May 1935	(Philippines) Olympic Stadium, Bacolod	Won Orient junior bantamweight title
21	Win	19–1–1	(Philippines) Kid Agustin	PTS	10	23 Mar 1935	(Philippines) Bacolod City, Negros Occidental	
20	Win	18–1–1	(Philippines) Rocky Montano	PTS	10	2 Mar 1935	(Philippines) Cavite City, Cavite	
19	Win	17–1–1	(Philippines) James Eagle	PTS	10	19 Jan 1935	(Philippines) Rizal Memorial Coliseum, Manila	
18	Win	16–1–1	(United States) Johnny Mortell	PTS	10	29 Dec 1934	(Philippines) Rizal Memorial Coliseum, Manila	
17	Win	15-0-1	(United States) Johnny Mortell	PTS	6	1 Dec 1934	(Philippines) Rizal Memorial Coliseum, Manila	
16	Win	14–1–1	(Philippines) Small Doro	PTS	6	10 Nov 1934	(Philippines) Rizal Memorial Coliseum, Manila	
15	Win	13–1–1	(Philippines) Small Doro	PTS	10	3 Oct 1934	(Philippines) Stadium, Mandaluyong	
14	Win	12–1–1	(Philippines) Rush Medina	PTS	8	18 Aug 1934	(Philippines) Stadium, Mandaluyong	
13	Win	11–1–1	(Philippines) Rush Medina	TKO	6 (8)	7 Jul 1934	(Philippines) La Loma Stadium, Quezon City	
12	Win	10–1–1	(Philippines) Dan Viranda	PTS	8	3 Feb 1934	(Philippines) Olympic Stadium, Manila	
11	Win	9–1–1	(Philippines) Joe Brazil	PTS	8	20 Jan 1934	(Philippines) Olympic Stadium, Manila	
10	Win	8–1–1	(Philippines) Rush Medina	PTS	8	9 Dec 1933	(Philippines) Olympic Stadium, Manila	
9	Win	7–1–1	(Philippines) Small Doro	PTS	6	11 Nov 1933	(Philippines) Manila, Metro Manila	
8	Win	6–1–1	(Philippines) Tony Gorilla	PTS	4	9 Sep 1933	(Philippines) Manila, Metro Manila	
7	Win	5–1–1	(Philippines) Little Javier	PTS	?	9 Sep 1933	Silanganan Stadium, Santa Cruz	
6	Win	4–1–1	(Philippines) Little Bagnoy	PTS	4	1 Jul 1933	(Philippines) Manila, Metro Manila	
5	Win	3–1–1	(Philippines) Pendio Vinia	PTS	6	10 Mar 1933	(Philippines) Navy Yard Cavite City	
4	Loss	2–1–1	(Philippines) Max Moro	PTS	4	28 Jan 1933	(Philippines) Manila, Metro Manila	
3	Win	2–0–1	(Philippines) Pendio Vinia	PTS	4	24 Dec 1932	(Philippines) Pasay City, Metro Manila	
2	Win	1–0–1	(Philippines) David Dencio	PTS	4	3 Sep 1932	(Philippines) Manila, Metro Manila	
1	Draw	0–0–1	(Philippines) Frankie Librado	PTS	4	24 Aug 1932	(Philippines) ???	

== See also ==
- List of flyweight boxing champions
