= Manuel Ortiz (boxer) =

American boxer (1916–1970)

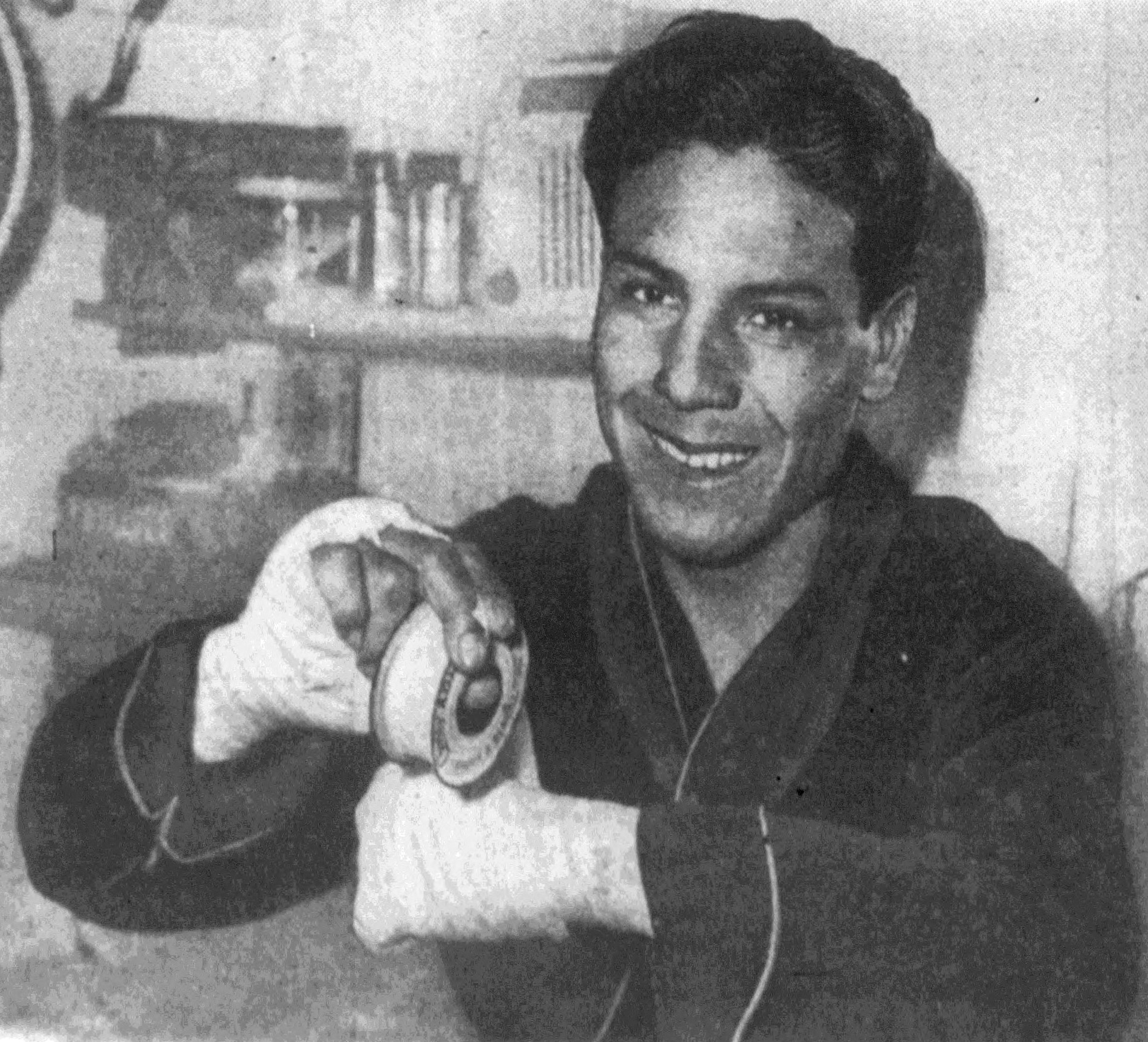
- Ortiz, circa 1950

Personal information
- Nationality: American
- Born: Manuel Ortiz; July 2, 1916 Corona, California, United States
- Died: May 31, 1970 (aged 53)
- Height: 5 ft 5 in (1.65 m)
- Weight: Lightweight; Featherweight; Bantamweight

Boxing career
- Reach: 66 in (168 cm)
- Stance: Orthodox

Boxing record
- Total fights: 131
- Wins: 100
- Win by KO: 54
- Losses: 28
- Draws: 3
- No contests: 0

Manuel Ortiz (July 2, 1916, Corona California – May 31, 1970, San Diego California) was an American professional boxer in the bantamweight division and one of the very best boxers of the 1940s. He was a two-time Undisputed Bantamweight World Champion and was named to The Ring's list of the 80 Best Fighters of the Last 80 Years. In 1996, he was inducted into the International Boxing Hall of Fame.

== Amateur career ==
Ortiz, who was of Mexican descent, started an amateur career in 1937. Within a year, Ortiz won the Southern California Amateur Flyweight Title, the Golden Gloves Title, and the National AAU title in Boston. He also defeated Chief Lopez, who was an Olympic runner-up, and Bobby Hagar (father of former Van Halen frontman Sammy Hagar) twice. In their first fight, Ortiz decked Hagar 17 times. In their second match, Ortiz decked Hagar twenty times. His hometown was El Cenro California.

== Professional career ==
Ortiz turned pro in 1938 and in 1942 won the World Bantamweight title by beating Lou Salica. He defended the title a division record of 15 times against 11 boxers before losing to Harold Dade in 1947. He regained the title in a rematch later in the year, and defended the title four more times giving him the most combined title defenses of any bantamweight champion in history at 19 title defenses. After losing his undisputed championship to the undefeated Vic Toweel in 1950, he went on to fight for 5 more years never getting a chance at an unprecedented third bantamweight title reign.

== Outside the Ring ==
- Ortiz made a very brief appearance in a gym scene in the 1947 movie Killer McCoy.
- Ortiz served in the U.S. Army.
- Ortiz died from cirrhosis of the liver after a long illness in 1970, in San Diego Naval Hospital.
- Ortiz is the very first boxer in the prominent boxing online database on BoxRec, having the Global ID number of simply "1".
- Ortiz spent most of his life living in El Centro, CA. Town in which he is currently buried.

== Professional boxing record ==
131 fights	100 wins	28 losses
By knockout	54	1
By decision	46	27
Draws	3	

No.	Result	Record	Opponent	Type	Round	Date	Location	Notes
131	Loss	100–28–3	Enrique Esqueda	PTS	10	Dec 10, 1955	Mexico City, Distrito Federal, Mexico	
130	Win	100–27–3	Papelero Sanchez	KO	3 (10)	Aug 16, 1955	Plaza de Toros, Mexicali, Baja California, Mexico	
129	Win	99–27–3	Memo Valero	KO	3 (10)	Jul 22, 1955	Campo de Softbol, Mexicali, Baja California, Mexico	
128	Win	98–27–3	Manuel Hernandez	KO	4 (10)	Jun 10, 1955	Ensenada, Baja California, Mexico	
127	Win	97–27–3	Manuel Hernandez	TKO	6 (10)	Mar 13, 1953	Mexicali, Baja California, Mexico	
126	Loss	96–27–3	Eddie Chavez	UD	10	Sep 3, 1951	San Jose, California, U.S.	
125	Loss	96–26–3	Jackie Graves	UD	10	Jul 17, 1951	Olympic Auditorium, Los Angeles, California, U.S.	
124	Loss	96–25–3	Tirso Del Rosario	PTS	10	Jun 2, 1951	Rizal Memorial Sports Complex, Manila, Metro Manila, Philippines	
123	Win	96–24–3	Bonnie Espinosa	KO	8 (10)	Mar 3, 1951	Rizal Memorial Sports Complex, Manila, Metro Manila, Philippines	
122	Loss	95–24–3	Lauro Salas	MD	10	Jan 26, 1951	Legion Stadium, Hollywood, California, U.S.	
121	Loss	95–23–3	Eddie Chavez	SD	10	Dec 5, 1950	Civic Auditorium, San Jose, California, U.S.	
120	Win	95–22–3	Jackie McCoy	UD	10	Nov 10, 1950	Legion Stadium, Hollywood, California, U.S.	
119	Loss	94–22–3	Vic Toweel	PTS	15	May 31, 1950	Wembley Stadium, Johannesburg, Gauteng, South Africa	Lost NBA, NYSAC, and The Ring bantamweight titles
118	Win	94–21–3	Harold Dade	SD	10	Mar 7, 1950	Olympic Auditorium, Los Angeles, California, U.S.	
117	Win	93–21–3	Theo Medina	PTS	10	Nov 14, 1949	Palais des Sports, Paris, France	
116	Win	92–21–3	Jackie Paterson	PTS	10	Oct 26, 1949	Hampden Park, Glasgow, Scotland	
115	Loss	91–21–3	Ronnie Clayton	PTS	10	Oct 3, 1949	King's Hall, Belle Vue, Manchester, Lancashire, England	
114	Loss	91–20–3	Jimmy Cooper	MD	10	Aug 29, 1949	Griffith Stadium, Washington, D.C., U.S.	
113	Win	91–19–3	Tony Vazquez	KO	4 (?)	Jul 23, 1949	Tampico, Tamaulipas, Mexico	
112	Win	90–19–3	Memo Valero	KO	7 (10)	Jul 16, 1949	Arena Coliseo, Mexico City, Distrito Federal, Mexico	
111	Win	89–19–3	Leonardo Lopez	KO	5 (10)	Jul 9, 1949	Plaza de Toros, Torreon, Coahuila de Zaragoza, Mexico	
110	Win	88–19–3	Beto Carvajal	PTS	10	Jun 29, 1949	Merida, Yucatán, Mexico	
109	Loss	87–19–3	Beto Couary	PTS	10	Jun 25, 1949	Veracruz, Mexico	
108	Win	87–18–3	Pinky Peralta	TKO	5 (10)	May 20, 1949	Monumental Plaza de Toros México, Mexico City, Distrito Federal, Mexico	
107	Win	86–18–3	Baby Mickey	KO	5 (10)	May 15, 1949	Sonora, Mexico	
106	Win	85–18–3	Lauro Salas	UD	10	Apr 26, 1949	Olympic Auditorium, Los Angeles, California, U.S.	
105	Loss	84–18–3	Henry Davis	UD	10	Mar 29, 1949	Honolulu Stadium, Honolulu, Hawaii	
104	Win	84–17–3	Dado Marino	UD	15	Mar 1, 1949	Honolulu Stadium, Honolulu, Hawaii	Retained NBA, NYSAC, and The Ring bantamweight titles
103	Win	83–17–3	Jose Cardenas	UD	10	Jan 1, 1949	Plaza de Toros, Mexicali, Baja California, Mexico	
102	Loss	82–17–3	Maxie Docusen	UD	10	Dec 14, 1948	Olympic Auditorium, Los Angeles, California, U.S.	
101	Win	82–16–3	Buddy Jacklich	KO	8 (10)	Oct 29, 1948	Legion Stadium, Hollywood, California, U.S.	
100	Loss	81–16–3	Lauro Salas	UD	10	Sep 28, 1948	Olympic Auditorium, Los Angeles, California, U.S.	
99	Win	81–15–3	Memo Valero	KO	8 (15)	Jul 4, 1948	Plaza de Toros, Mexicali, Baja California, Mexico	Retained NBA, NYSAC, and The Ring bantamweight titles
98	Win	80–15–3	Henry Davis	SD	10	May 25, 1948	Honolulu Stadium, Honolulu, Hawaii	
97	Win	79–15–3	Joey Dolan	RTD	6 (10)	Apr 27, 1948	Auditorium, Portland, Oregon, U.S.	
96	Win	78–15–3	Tirso Del Rosario	PTS	15	Dec 20, 1947	Rizal Memorial Sports Complex, Manila, Metro Manila, Philippines	Retained NBA, NYSAC, and The Ring bantamweight titles
95	Loss	77–15–3	Manny Ortega	TKO	8 (10)	Oct 15, 1947	County Coliseum, El Paso, Texas, U.S.	
94	Win	77–14–3	David Kui Kong Young	SD	15	May 30, 1947	Honolulu Stadium, Honolulu, Hawaii	Retained NBA, NYSAC, and The Ring bantamweight titles
93	Win	76–14–3	Harold Dade	UD	15	Mar 11, 1947	Olympic Auditorium, Los Angeles, California, U.S.	Won NBA, NYSAC, and The Ring bantamweight titles
92	Loss	75–14–3	Harold Dade	UD	15	Jan 6, 1947	Civic Auditorium, San Francisco, California, U.S.	Lost NBA, NYSAC, and The Ring bantamweight titles
91	Loss	75–13–3	Carlos Chavez	UD	12	Oct 22, 1946	Olympic Auditorium, Los Angeles, California, U.S.	For vacant USA California State featherweight title
90	Win	75–12–3	David Kui Kong Young	KO	7 (10)	Jul 12, 1946	Honolulu Stadium, Honolulu, Hawaii	
89	Win	74–12–3	Jackie Jurich	KO	11 (15)	Jun 10, 1946	Civic Auditorium, San Francisco, California, U.S.	Retained NBA, NYSAC, and The Ring bantamweight titles
88	Win	73–12–3	Kenny Lindsay	KO	5 (15)	May 22, 1946	Legion Stadium, Hollywood, California, U.S.	Retained NBA, NYSAC, and The Ring bantamweight titles
87	Win	72–12–3	Horace Leftwich	UD	10	Apr 22, 1946	Civic Auditorium, San Francisco, California, U.S.	
86	Draw	71–12–3	Carlos Chávez	PTS	15	Mar 19, 1946	Olympic Auditorium, Los Angeles, California, U.S.	For vacant USA California State featherweight title
85	Win	71–12–2	Luis Castillo	KO	13 (15)	Feb 25, 1946	Civic Auditorium, San Francisco, California, U.S.	Retained NBA, NYSAC, and The Ring bantamweight titles
84	Win	70–12–2	Eli Golindo	TKO	4 (10)	Feb 15, 1946	Legion Stadium, Hollywood, California, U.S.	
83	Win	69–12–2	Proctor Heinhold	PTS	10	Nov 20, 1945	Municipal Auditorium, San Antonio, Texas, U.S.	
82	Win	68–12–2	Jose Andreas	UD	10	Nov 12, 1945	Sportatorium, Dallas, Texas, U.S.	
81	Win	67–12–2	Horace Leftwich	PTS	10	Nov 2, 1945	Coliseum, San Diego, California, U.S.	
80	Win	66–12–2	Bert White	KO	7 (10)	Jan 26, 1945	Coliseum, San Diego, California, U.S.	
79	Win	65–12–2	Jose Gonzalez	MD	10	Jan 12, 1945	Legion Stadium, Hollywood, California, U.S.	
78	Win	64–12–2	Lorenzo Safora	PTS	10	Nov 22, 1944	Auditorium, Oakland, California, U.S.	
77	Win	63–12–2	Luis Castillo	TKO	9 (15)	Nov 14, 1944	Olympic Auditorium, Los Angeles, California, U.S.	Retained NBA, NYSAC, and The Ring bantamweight titles
76	Win	62–12–2	Carlos Chávez	SD	10	Sep 30, 1944	Gilmore Stadium, Los Angeles, California, U.S.	
75	Win	61–12–2	Luis Castillo	TKO	4 (15)	Sep 12, 1944	Olympic Auditorium, Los Angeles, California, U.S.	Retained NBA, NYSAC, and The Ring bantamweight titles
74	Win	60–12–2	Enrique Bolanos	TKO	6 (10)	Aug 29, 1944	Olympic Auditorium, Los Angeles, California, U.S.	
73	Loss	59–12–2	Willie Pep	UD	10	Jul 17, 1944	Braves Field, Boston, Massachusetts, U.S.	
72	Win	59–11–2	Larry Bolvin	UD	10	Jun 29, 1944	Braves Field, Boston, Massachusetts, U.S.	
71	Win	58–11–2	Pee Wee Lewis	TKO	9 (10)	May 19, 1944	Legion Stadium, Hollywood, California, U.S.	
70	Win	57–11–2	Tony Olivera	UD	15	Apr 4, 1944	Olympic Auditorium, Los Angeles, California, U.S.	Retained NBA, NYSAC, and The Ring bantamweight titles
69	Win	56–11–2	Ernesto Aguilar	UD	15	Mar 14, 1944	Olympic Auditorium, Los Angeles, California, U.S.	Retained NBA, NYSAC, and The Ring bantamweight titles
68	Win	55–11–2	Benny Goldberg	UD	15	Nov 23, 1943	Olympic Auditorium, Los Angeles, California, U.S.	Retained NBA, NYSAC, and The Ring bantamweight titles
67	Win	54–11–2	Leonardo Lopez	KO	4 (15)	Oct 1, 1943	Legion Stadium, Hollywood, California, U.S.	Retained NBA, NYSAC, and The Ring bantamweight titles
66	Win	53–11–2	Fillo Gonzalez	KO	5 (10)	Sep 4, 1943	Arena Coliseo, Mexico City, Distrito Federal, Mexico	
65	Win	52–11–2	Leonardo Lopez	UD	10	Aug 13, 1943	Legion Stadium, Hollywood, California, U.S.	
64	Win	51–11–2	Joe Robleto	TKO	7 (15)	Jul 12, 1943	Civic Auditorium, Seattle, Washington, U.S.	Retained NBA, NYSAC, and The Ring bantamweight titles
63	Win	50–11–2	Tony Olivera	TKO	7 (10)	Jun 25, 1943	Legion Stadium, Hollywood, California, U.S.	
62	Win	49–11–2	Joe Robleto	UD	15	May 26, 1943	Municipal Auditorium, Long Beach, California, U.S.	Retained NBA, NYSAC, and The Ring bantamweight titles
61	Win	48–11–2	Lupe Cordoza	KO	6 (15)	Apr 28, 1943	Will Rogers Coliseum, Fort Worth, Texas, U.S.	Retained NBA, NYSAC, and The Ring bantamweight titles
60	Win	47–11–2	Joe Robleto	PTS	10	Apr 16, 1943	Coliseum, San Diego, California, U.S.	
59	Win	46–11–2	Pedro Ramirez	KO	6 (10)	Apr 2, 1943	Legion Stadium, Hollywood, California, U.S.	
58	Win	45–11–2	Lou Salica	TKO	11 (15)	Mar 10, 1943	Auditorium, Oakland, California, U.S.	Retained NBA, and The Ring bantamweight titles; Won vacant NYSAC bantamweight title
57	Win	44–11–2	George Freitas	TKO	10 (15)	Jan 27, 1943	Auditorium, Oakland, California, U.S.	Retained NBA, and The Ring bantamweight titles
56	Win	43–11–2	Kenny Lindsay	UD	10	Jan 1, 1943	Auditorium, Portland, Oregon, U.S.	Retained NBA, and The Ring bantamweight titles
55	Win	42–11–2	Nat Corum	TKO	6 (10)	Oct 30, 1942	Legion Stadium, Hollywood, California, U.S.	
54	Win	41–11–2	Nat Corum	PTS	10	Oct 9, 1942	Auditorium, Portland, Oregon, U.S.	
53	Win	40–11–2	Bobby Carroll	KO	5 (10)	Sep 25, 1942	Coliseum, San Diego, California, U.S.	
52	Win	39–11–2	Lou Salica	UD	12	Aug 7, 1942	Legion Stadium, Hollywood, California, U.S.	Won NBA and The Ring bantamweight titles
51	Win	38–11–2	Elwood Romero	TKO	6 (10)	Jul 3, 1942	Legion Stadium, Hollywood, California, U.S.	
50	Win	37–11–2	Leonardo Lopez	TKO	10 (10)	May 30, 1942	Plaza de Toros, Tijuana, Baja California, Mexico	
49	Win	36–11–2	Kenny Lindsay	KO	6 (10)	May 8, 1942	Legion Stadium, Hollywood, California, U.S.	
48	Win	35–11–2	Little Pancho	KO	7 (10)	Mar 6, 1942	Legion Stadium, Hollywood, California, U.S.	
47	Win	34–11–2	Tony Olivera	MD	10	Jan 2, 1942	Legion Stadium, Hollywood, California, U.S.	Won USA California bantamweight title
46	Win	33–11–2	Johnny Grady	PTS	8	Nov 21, 1941	Coliseum, San Diego, California, U.S.	
45	Win	32–11–2	Donnie Maes	SD	10	Nov 7, 1941	Legion Stadium, Hollywood, California, U.S.	
44	Loss	31–11–2	Tony Olivera	PTS	10	Aug 8, 1941	Legion Stadium, Hollywood, California, U.S.	For USA California bantamweight title
43	Win	31–10–2	Lou Transparenti	KO	7 (10)	Jun 6, 1941	Legion Stadium, Hollywood, California, U.S.	
42	Win	30–10–2	Chucho Llanes	PTS	8	May 14, 1941	San Bernardino A.C., San Bernardino, California, U.S.	
41	Win	29–10–2	Carlos Chávez	PTS	10	May 9, 1941	Legion Stadium, Hollywood, California, U.S.	
40	Draw	28–10–2	Carlos Chávez	PTS	10	Apr 4, 1941	Legion Stadium, Hollywood, California, U.S.	
39	Win	28–10–1	Lupe Cordoza	TKO	8 (10)	Mar 14, 1941	Memorial Auditorium, Sacramento, California, U.S.	
38	Win	27–10–1	Joe Robleto	TKO	6 (10)	Feb 11, 1941	Calexico Arena, Calexico, California, U.S.	
37	Win	26–10–1	Rush Dalma	KO	3 (10)	Jan 10, 1941	Legion Stadium, Hollywood, California, U.S.	
36	Win	25–10–1	Carlos Manzano	KO	6 (10)	Oct 26, 1940	Arena Mexico, Mexico City, Distrito Federal, Mexico	
35	Win	24–10–1	Panchito Villa	TKO	7 (10)	Oct 10, 1940	Monterrey, Nuevo León, Mexico	
34	Loss	23–10–1	Panchito Villa	PTS	10	May 18, 1940	Mexico City, Distrito Federal, Mexico	
33	Win	23–9–1	Panchito Villa	PTS	10	Apr 20, 1940	Arena Mexico, Mexico City, Distrito Federal, Mexico	
32	Win	22–9–1	Jackie Jurich	TKO	9 (10)	Apr 5, 1940	Legion Stadium, Hollywood, California, U.S.	
31	Win	21–9–1	Andy Vasquez	TKO	5 (6)	Mar 21, 1940	Legion Stadium, Hollywood, California, U.S.	
30	Draw	20–9–1	Little Dado	PTS	10	Jan 30, 1940	Civic Auditorium, Stockton, California, U.S.	
29	Win	20–9	Elwood Romero	PTS	10	Dec 14, 1939	Memorial Auditorium, Sacramento, California, U.S.	
28	Win	19–9	Cyril Joseph	KO	5 (10)	Dec 5, 1939	San Jose, California, U.S.	
27	Win	18–9	Horace Mann	PTS	10	Oct 24, 1939	Civic Auditorium, San Jose, California, U.S.	
26	Loss	17–9	Donnie Maes	PTS	10	Oct 17, 1939	Civic Auditorium, San Jose, California, U.S.	
25	Loss	17–8	Lou Salica	PTS	10	Sep 15, 1939	Legion Stadium, Hollywood, California, U.S.	
24	Loss	17–7	Bobby Leyvas	PTS	10	Aug 8, 1939	Riverview Bowl, Yuma, Arizona, U.S.	
23	Loss	17–6	Jackie Jurich	PTS	10	Jun 9, 1939	Legion Stadium, Hollywood, California, U.S.	For vacant American flyweight title
22	Win	17–5	Sammy LaPorte	TKO	7 (10)	May 4, 1939	El Centro Arena, El Centro, California, U.S.	
21	Win	16–5	Tommy Cobb	PTS	10	Apr 11, 1939	Civic Auditorium, San Jose, California, U.S.	
20	Win	15–5	Jackie Jurich	TKO	7 (10)	Mar 14, 1939	Civic Auditorium, San Jose, California, U.S.	
19	Loss	14–5	Small Montana	PTS	10	Jan 2, 1939	Stockton, California, U.S.	
18	Win	14–4	Bernie Reyes	PTS	10	Dec 6, 1938	Olympic Auditorium, Los Angeles, California, U.S.	
17	Loss	13–4	David Kui Kong Young	PTS	10	Nov 8, 1938	Olympic Auditorium, Los Angeles, California, U.S.	
16	Win	13–3	Richie Lemos	PTS	10	Oct 21, 1938	Legion Stadium, Hollywood, California, U.S.	
15	Win	12–3	Richie Lemos	PTS	6	Sep 30, 1938	Legion Stadium, Hollywood, California, U.S.	
14	Win	11–3	Kent Martinez	KO	1 (4)	Sep 23, 1938	Coliseum, San Diego, California, U.S.	
13	Win	10–3	Tony Navarro	KO	3 (?)	Aug 15, 1938	El Centro, California, U.S.	
12	Loss	9–3	Benny Goldberg	PTS	4	Aug 5, 1938	Gilmore Stadium, Los Angeles, California, U.S.	
11	Loss	9–2	Pablo Dano	PTS	6	Jul 5, 1938	Olympic Auditorium, Los Angeles, California, U.S.	
10	Win	9–1	Reuben Ayon	TKO	5 (6)	Jun 27, 1938	Long Beach Arena, Long Beach, California, U.S.	
9	Win	8–1	Frenchy Savidan	PTS	4	Jun 24, 1938	Gilmore Stadium, Los Angeles, California, U.S.	
8	Win	7–1	Joe Rickey	TKO	3 (6)	Jun 6, 1938	Long Beach Arena, Long Beach, California, U.S.	
7	Win	6–1	Sammy LaPorte	PTS	4	Jun 3, 1938	Gilmore Stadium, Los Angeles, California, U.S.	
6	Win	5–1	Santos Hugo	TKO	4 (4)	May 17, 1938	Olympic Auditorium, Los Angeles, California, U.S.	
5	Win	4–1	General Padilla	TKO	4 (4)	May 3, 1938	Olympic Auditorium, Los Angeles, California, U.S.	
4	Win	3–1	Serio Mendoza	PTS	4	Apr 14, 1938	Legion Stadium, Hollywood, California, U.S.	
3	Win	2–1	Frenchy Savidan	PTS	4	Mar 25, 1938	Legion Stadium, Hollywood, California, U.S.	
2	Win	1–1	Tony Navarro	PTS	4	Mar 11, 1938	Legion Stadium, Hollywood, California, U.S.	
1	Loss	0–1	Benny Goldberg	PTS	4	Feb 25, 1938	Legion Stadium, Hollywood, California, U.S.	

== Titles in boxing ==
=== Major world titles ===
- NYSAC bantamweight champion (118 lbs) (2×)
- NBA (WBA) bantamweight champion (118 lbs) (2×)

=== The Ring magazine titles ===
- The Ring bantamweight champion (118 lbs) (2×)

=== Regional/International titles ===
- California State bantamweight champion (118 lbs)

=== Undisputed titles ===
- Undisputed bantamweight champion (2×)

== See also ==
- List of Mexican boxing world champions
- List of world bantamweight boxing champions

Achievements
Preceded by Lou Salica	World Bantamweight Champion; 7 Aug 1942– 6 Jan 1947	Succeeded by Harold Dade
Preceded by Harold Dade	World Bantamweight Champion; 11 Mar 1947– 31 May 1950	Succeeded by Vic Toweel
