= Louis Salica =

American boxer (1912-2002)

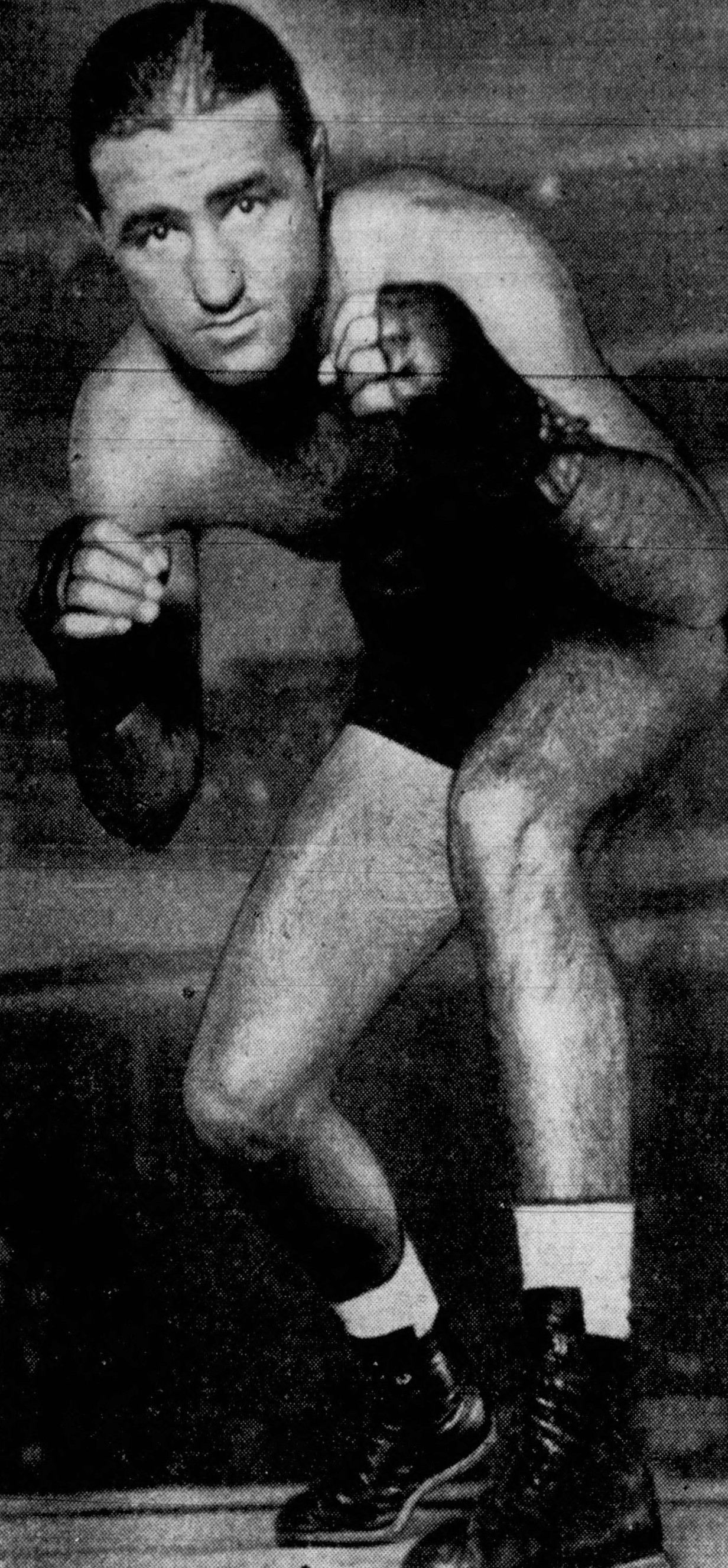
- Salica, circa 1942

Personal information
- Nationality: American
- Born: Luigi Salica; November 16, 1912 Brooklyn, New York, U.S.
- Died: January 30, 2002 (aged 89) Brooklyn, New York, U.S.
- Height: 5 ft 4 in (1.63 m)
- Weight: Bantamweight

Boxing career
- Stance: Orthodox

Boxing record
- Total fights: 91
- Wins: 62
- Win by KO: 13
- Losses: 17
- Draws: 12
Medal record
Men's Boxing
Representing the United States
Olympic Games
Bronze medal – third place	1932 Los Angeles	Flyweight

Louis ("Lou") Salica (November 16, 1912 – January 30, 2002) was an American boxer, who captured the Undisputed World Bantamweight Title twice in his career, in 1935 and 1940. His managers were Hymie Kaplan and Willie Ketchum. Some sources list a different birth date for Salica, July 26, 1913.

As a youth, Salica won the Flyweight bronze medal as an amateur at the 1932 Summer Olympics in Los Angeles.

== Early life and boxing career ==
Salica was born in Brooklyn, New York to a large Italian family of sixteen children on November 16, 1912. As an exceptional amateur, he won the New York City Golden Gloves Flyweight Championship in 1932. He won the Metropolitan Flyweight Championship in 1931 and 1932, as well as the 1932 National AAU Flyweight Championship.

Turning professional and fighting in the Brooklyn area from December 1932 to February 1934, he won fifteen of his first sixteen bouts with one draw.

On December 27, 1933, he defeated Native American boxer Pete DeGrasse in a six round points decision in Broadway Arena in Brooklyn. He would fight and defeat DeGrasse again in a longer ten round points decision on May 11, 1937 at Olympic Stadium in Los Angeles. DeGrasse normally fought as a featherweight, outweighed Salica by three pounds. Salica opened a cut over the eye of DeGrasse in the seventh round, but DeGrasse finished strong in the close bout, making many in the crowd question the referee's decision.

He defeated Harry Bauman once on April 2, 1934 in a six round points decision at St. Nicholas Arena in New York City.

On August 10, 1934, he defeated Joe Tei Ken, a Korean San Francisco native, in a ten round points decision at Legion Stadium in Hollywood, California. Salica was a slight favorite going into the bout.

September 7, 1934, he defeated Filipino boxer Young Tommy in a ten round points decision at Hollywood's Legion Stadium. He came in strong in the final rounds to defeat his opponent. Both boxers weighed very close to 118 in the weigh ins.

On October 19, 1934, in a well publicized bout, he lost to Filipino boxer Speedy Dado in a ten round points decision at Legion Stadium in California. Dado showed greater speed and accuracy in his punching, though Salica often scored points in rounds when Dado was tiring, and clearly won the fifth.

On December 20, 1934, he defeated Carlos "Indian" Quinatana in a ten round decision at the Forum in Montreal, Canada. He scored two no count knockdowns in early rounds, but had to come from behind in a strong finish when Quintana made a strong showing in the middle rounds. The bout was an early match for the World Bantamweight elimination tournament.

On June 11, 1935, he defeated Pablo Dano in a ten round points decision at Olympic Auditorium in Los Angeles. As many as 10,000 were anticipated for the fight between two boxers considered bantamweight title contenders, even if only in California. He would defeat Dano again in a ten round points decision on August 20, 1938 at Gilmore Stadium in Los Angeles.

On July 30, 1935, he met Jerry Mazza in an eighth round draw at the Coney Island Velodrome in Brooklyn. Salica was outweighed by nearly eight pounds in the feature bout.

== NBA Bantam Champ ==
On August 26, 1935, Salica took the National Boxing Association Bantamweight Championship against Puerto Rican boxer Sixto Escobar in a close fifteen round decision at Dyckman Oval in Manhattan. Many ringside questioned the decision of the judges that gave the win to Salica.

=== Loss of Bantam title ===
Salica subsequently lost the World Bantamweight Championship to Escobar just two months later on November 15, 1935 in a fifteen round Unanimous Decision at New York's Madison Square Garden. Escobar floored Salica for a nine count in the third round after a series of right crosses, and staggered him several times during the bout. The United Press gave Escobar nine of the eleven rounds, in a decisive victory where only the ninth, tenth, and eleventh were given graciously to Salica, the ninth being even.

=== Bouts after loss of Bantam title ===
==== Bout with Tony Marino ====
On June 2, 1936, he was defeated by Tony Marino, future NYSAC World Bantamweight Title Holder, in Queensboro Arena in New York. Marino surprised the crowd with an unexpected ten round points decision over Salica, the former World Bantamweight Champion. It was a victory that helped Marino rise to greater prominence.

On November 2, 1937, Salica scored a fourth round technical knockout against Joey Wach in Brooklyn. Wach was down three times in the fourth round, the first time for a nine count before the referee stopped the fight after one minute of the fourth. The fighting was fairly even in the first three rounds.

==== Important California fights ====
On July 22, 1938 he defeated Mexican boxer Emilio Magana in a ninth round technical knockout at Gilmore Stadium in Los Angeles, California. It was an impressive win for Salica, as one reporter described his victory as a "first class going-over" against Magana. Salica fought at only 119 pounds, still in the bantamweight range.

On August 26, 1938, he defeated "Young" Joe Roche in an eighth round Technical Knockout at Dreamland Auditorium in San Francisco, California.

On January 21, 1939, he fought Tony Dupre to an eight round draw at Ridgewood Grove, in Salica's howmetown of Brooklyn. The bout was a feature fight only scheduled for eight rounds, and according to one source, Salica was fighting for the first time as a featherweight.

On April 6, 1939, he defeated Richie Lemos at Hollywood's Legion Stadium in a ten round points decision in an important win. In July 1941, Lemos would take the NBA World Featherweight Championship.

On May 19, 1939, he defeated Filipino boxer Little Pancho in a ten round points decision at Hollywood's Legion Stadium. Little Pancho was an important bantamweight and half brother to the great Filipino boxer Pancho Villa.

He defeated Jackie Jurich on August 18, 1939 at Legion Stadium in Hollywood, California in a ninth round knockout. Jurich who was claimant of the American Flyweight Title, was outweighed by Salica by four pounds.

=== Bantam title bout with Tony Olivera ===
On November 16, 1939, Salica fought a NYSAC World Bantamweight Boxing Championship title bout against Tony Olivera, winning in a ten round points decision in Hollywood, California.

== Retaking World Bantam title ==
On March 4, 1940, Salica fought Black Cleveland-based boxer Georgie Pace for the first time in Toronto, Canada in an important NBA World Bantamweight Boxing Championship, but received a Draw for the fifteen round bout. It was Salica's first attempt at the NBA World Title since having lost it to Sixto Escobar.

On September 24, 1940 he reclaimed the NBA World Bantamweight Title against Georgie Pace closer to home in a fifteen round Unanimous Decision at the New York Coliseum in the Bronx. The Arizona Republic wrote, "it was a dead close fight for nine rounds, but Pace tired in the stretch, and Salica came on to win. At the finish with a partisan crowd of 4,183 cheering him on, he (Salica) was barely breathing heavily." The crowd of 4,183 was small for a title fight, perhaps due to fans being less interested in the Bantamweight division than lightweight and above, as well as the frequency with which the title had changed hands. Sixto Escobar had vacated his claim to the NBA World Bantamweight Title the previous year. Pace was recognized as the NBA World Bantamweight Title holder at the time of the fight, and Salica was still considered by the New York State Athletic Commission to hold their version of the World Title, largely as a result of his win over Tony Olivera the previous year.

On December 2, 1940, he technically knocked out Small Montana, former flyweight champion, in the third round in Toronto to defend his World Bantamweight Championship. Salica floored Montana, nine times, before the fight was stopped 1:30 into the third round. Montana was knocked down three times in the first round, four times in the second round, and twice in the third. It was an important win for Salica, who outweighed Montana by four pounds in the weigh-in.

=== Second World Bantam title defenses ===
On April 25, 1941, he won a fifteen round NBA World Bantamweight Championship defense against Lou Transparenti in Baltimore, Maryland.

On January 13, 1941, he defeated Tommy Forte for the first time in a fifteen round split decision World Title defense at Philadelphia. "From the seventh to the thirteenth round Forte battered Salica around the ring". In the fourth round Forte injured Salica's eye, causing problem for Salica through the remainder of the bout. In the fourteenth and fifteenth rounds Salica recovered his form and took the fight to Forte, winning the close bout by only one round. On June 16, 1941, he defended his title in a more impressive fifteen round unanimous decision against Tommy Forte before a significant crowd of 14,500 at Shibe Park in Philadelphia. Forte entered the ring an underdog in the betting but came from behind to win the later rounds (but not the fight). It was his last successful NBA World Championship defense. There were no knockdowns in the bout. Salica had lost to Forte the previous October in a ten round unanimous decision in a non-title match in Philadelphia. His two subsequent victories in title fights demonstrated he could improve his skills in title matches.

On August 8, 1941, he defeated Henry Hook in a ten round Unanimous Decision at the Coney Island Velodrome in Brooklyn, New York. Salica was outweighed by around seven pounds and a half pounds in the non-title fight. The close fight, described as thrilling, was fought before a crowd of 5,000. An excited crowd cheered as Hook continued to reign blows on Salica in late rounds, but was unable to capture the decision.

=== Loss of Bantam title to Manuel Ortiz ===
On August 7, 1942, he lost his second NBA World Bantamweight Title against Manuel Ortiz at Legion Stadium in Hollywood, California in a twelve round Unanimous Decision before a crowd of 6,000. Ortiz fought for only $250, and for the opportunity to take Salica's NBA World Bantamweight Title. The fight benefited the USO and helped to buy athletic equipment and stage athletic shows for servicemen. The Los Angeles Times tellingly noted that Salica had lost much of the speed of his former boxing days, having weathered a large number of fights in his twelve year career as a boxer. The NYSAC had issues with Ortiz as the new champion, as the bout had been scheduled for only twelve and not fifteen rounds. In a fairly decisive win for Ortiz, the Associated Press and two of the judges ringside gave three rounds to Salica and the remaining nine rounds to Ortiz.

On March 10, 1943, Ortiz defeated Salica again in an eleventh round TKO at the Auditorium in Oakland, California before an enthusiastic crowd of 7,000. Eventually both the NBA and the NYSAC recognized Ortiz's claim to the title as a result of his win. One source noted that Ortiz had the edge in every round, brutalizing Salica with body blows. The United Press gave Ortiz all but two rounds, the first and the fourth. Early in the eleventh, Ortiz put Salica down on one knee for a nine count, and Salica's manager, Willie Ketchum, stopped the fight. It was the first knockout Salica had received in his career. Both boxers weighed in at close to 118.

On March 27, 1944, Salica fought his last professional bout with Harry Jeffra, losing in a ten round unanimous decision in Baltimore. The bout was important as Jeffra had held both the NYSAC World Featherweight Championship in 1937 and the NYSAC World Bantamweight Championship in 1940. Salica won only one round in the bout that was described as "a cautious, cagey battle between ex-champions that afforded little excitement and no knockdowns."

== Titles in boxing ==
=== Major world titles ===
- NYSAC bantamweight champion (118 lbs) (2×)
- NBA (WBA) bantamweight champion (118 lbs) (2×)

=== Undisputed titles ===
- Undisputed bantamweight champion (2×)

== Life after boxing ==
On February 1, 1946, Salica was sentenced to an eighteen month prison term for obtaining "kick-backs" from civilian workers while working as a civilian carpentry foreman at an Army base in his hometown of Brooklyn. Salica was working at the New York Port of Embarkation installation. He was officially sentenced with conspiracy to bribe. A jury of the Federal Court had found him guilty in mid-January. During the initial arrests made on December 20, 1945 the FBI suspected mob activity as "gangster methods" consisting of physical violence were used to silence complaints". Several gangs were using muscle to compete for the lucrative kickbacks.

Living a long life for a championship boxer, he died on January 30, 2002, in his hometown of Brooklyn at the age of 89.

== See also ==
- List of bantamweight boxing champions

Achievements
Preceded by Sixto Escobar	NBA World Bantamweight Champion; August 26, 1935 – November 15, 1935	Succeeded by Sixto Escobar (Vacated)
Vacant	World Bantamweight Champion; September 24, 1940 – August 7, 1942	Succeeded by Manuel Ortiz
