= Benny Goldberg =

Polish boxer

Bennie Goldberg
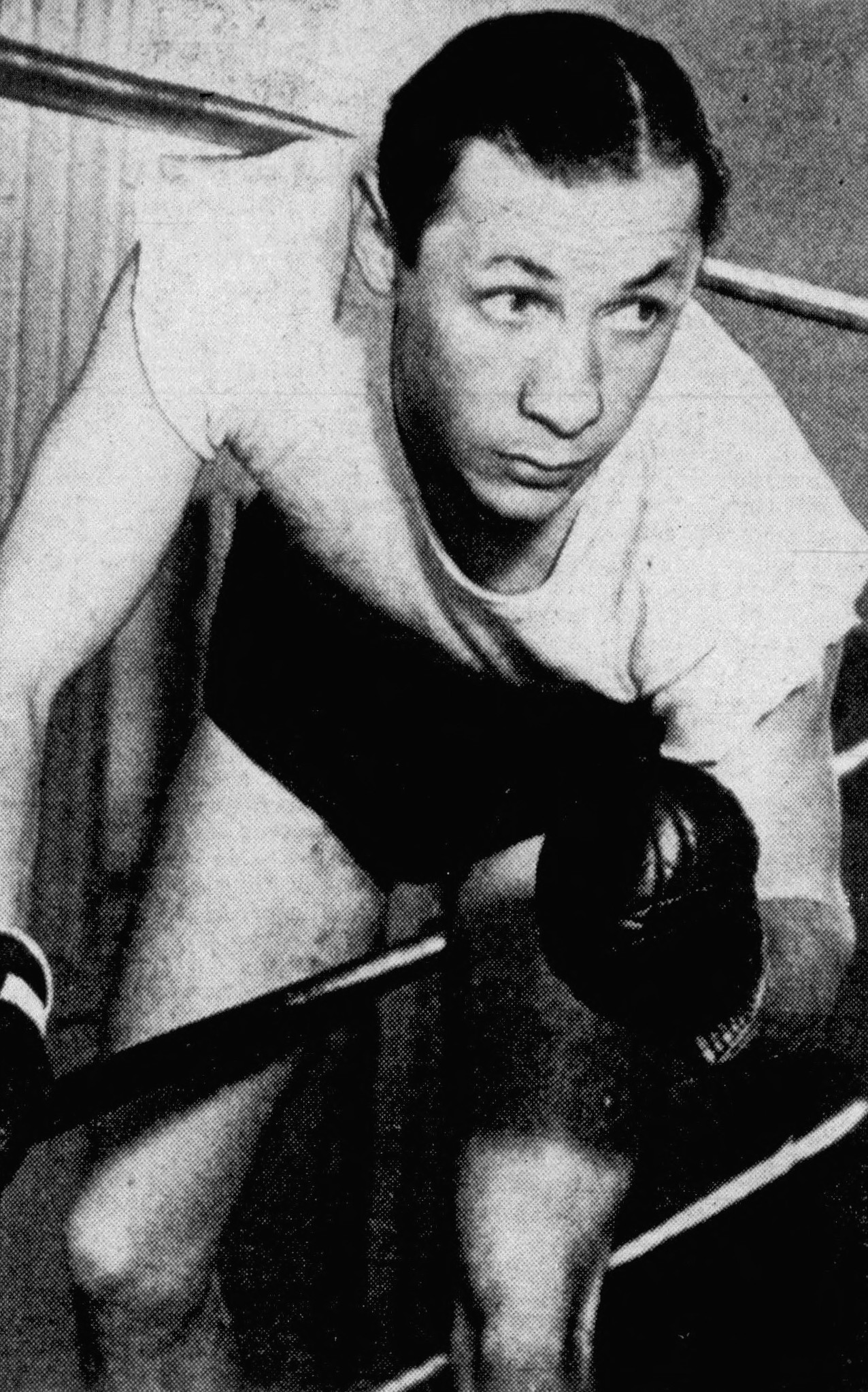
- Goldberg, circa 1945

Personal information
- Nickname: The Fighting Jew
- Nationality: (Poland) Polish-American
- Born: Benjamin Goldberg; 25 December 1918 Warsaw, Poland
- Died: 29 September 2001 (aged 82) Los Angeles, California, U.S.
- Height: 5 ft 5 in (1.65 m)
- Weight: Bantamweight

Boxing career
- Stance: Southpaw

Boxing record
- Total fights: 43
- Wins: 38
- Win by KO: 11
- Losses: 2
- Draws: 2
- No contests: 1

Bennie Goldberg (25 December 1918 – 29 September 2001) was a Polish-born American bantamweight boxer and a top rated contender for the Bantamweight title for a five-year stretch in the 1940s. His professional boxing career spanned from 1937 to 1946. After his boxing career, he appeared in television and movies, worked as a ring announcer, and performed in clubs, often as a comedian, with the stage name Ben Bentley.

== Early life ==
Born in Warsaw, Poland, on December 25, 1918, Goldberg's parents brought him to America when he was two years old, and the family settled in Detroit. Benny studied the technique of the triple world champion Barney Ross, who excelled as a light and welterweight from 1933 to 1938, when Benny was in his teens. Goldberg's careful attention to the champion's style paid off over time.

== Amateur boxing career ==
His use of a left-handed or Southpaw stance was a challenge to many of his competitors. As an amateur, he won the Detroit Golden Gloves Bantamweight Championship in 1935 and in 1936, and took the AAU Bantamweight Championship of Michigan from Olympic Gold Medalist and future Bantamweight World Champion Jackie Wilson.

Goldberg did not turn pro until 1937, after completing an outstanding amateur record.

== Professional boxing career ==
Early in his career Goldberg convincingly beat George Annarino with a sixth-round knockout on May 2, 1939. Annarino was the previous holder of the 1930 Ohio State Bantamweight title. It was a victory that got the attention of his fans, though not surprising considering his successful amateur career.

Goldberg defeated Johnny Marselline on June 2, 1941, flooring him for a six count in the third. Goldberg was often sloppy and shy in his ring generalship as evidenced in this match, and did not entirely impress the audience in this early stage of his career. Marselline was a talented featherweight who would amass an impressive record in his career.

Jimmy Gilligan lost to Goldberg On March 23, 1942, in an eight-round decision at Civic Auditorium in Toledo, Ohio. Goldberg had previously beaten Gilligan on March 21, 1941 in an eight-round decision in Detroit where he floored his opponent three times in the convincing win. Gilligan was a competent bantamweight who had once beaten Joey Archibald. Though a talented and experienced opponent, he was nearing the end of his ten-year career.

Though suffering from a significant disadvantage in height, Goldberg defeated talented bantamweight and former USA New England featherweight champion Abe Denner On April 27, 1942 at Arena Gardens in Detroit in a ten-round points decision. The win was considered an upset against the talented Denner, and elevated Goldberg's standings as a world bantamweight contender. Denner was ranked fourth in the world among featherweights at the time of the match. Goldberg knocked Denner to the mat in the fourth round, and achieved a large margin in points scoring, despite giving up six pounds in weight as well as many as five inches in reach.

Goldberg defeated Joey Archibald, former World Featherweight Champion, on July 21, 1942, in Toledo, Ohio, in a ten-round points decision. The important win was considered an upset over such a skilled opponent, and made Goldberg a boxer to watch.

On December 14, 1942, Goldberg impressively knocked out Lou Transparenti in the fourth round at Arena Gardens in Detroit. Transparenti, a quality opponent, had competed unsuccessfully for the World Bantamweight title against Lou Salica in March 1941, and had performed well in the first ten rounds, holding the favor of the crowd. Ironically, Transparenti had convincingly beaten Salica just one month earlier, but in a non-title bout.

Goldberg defeated Tony Olivera on April 30, 1943 in ten rounds at Legion Stadium in Hollywood. Though outweighed, Goldberg defended Olivera's attack with fast counterpunching to the body and head. By the sixth and seventh, Olivera had adjusted to Goldberg's unusual southpaw stance and had opened a slight margin in points. In the last three rounds, Goldberg used his leading southpaw left to score to the stomach and face of Olivera, gradually building his point's margin enough to win the close decision. There were no knockdowns in the bout between the two well matched competitors. The bout spotlighted Goldberg as a serious contender for the World Bantamweight Title. Goldberg had formerly drawn with Olivera in July 1938. Goldberg was ranked third in the world among Bantamweights prior to the bout.

=== World bantam title attempt, 1943 ===
On November 23, 1943, Goldberg lost to Manuel Ortiz in a fifteen-round decision for the World Bantamweight Championship at Olympic Stadium in Los Angeles. Goldberg had defeated future champion Ortiz on August 5, 1938, in a four-round bout in Los Angeles when both were preliminary fighters just starting out in the professional ranks. Ortiz, now a formidable opponent making the eighth defense of his title, would hold it for eight years, defending it twenty one times. In a decisive win, Ortiz won by an average of twenty points in the judges scoring. For the first five rounds, both boxers felt each other out, aware of the potential threat in their opponent's gloves, though the pace disappointed the 10,000 fans in the stadium, which was full to capacity. Goldberg put up an excellent defense in the first nine rounds, not allowing Ortiz to get to his body. However, he was rarely able to penetrate Ortiz's defenses, scoring on only a few rights to the head and body. Ortiz nearly floored Goldberg in the tenth with rights to the stomach, after breaking through his initially thorough defense. In the twelfth, Ortiz scored again with rights to the belly of Ortiz that affected him for the next two rounds, allowing Ortiz to coast through the thirteenth and fourteenth rounds. The Ortiz loss was the first in twenty-three prior starts for Goldberg, formerly a rising star and a serious contender for the Bantamweight crown.

After his loss to Ortiz on January 1, 1944, Goldberg lost to Billy Miller before a crowd of 4,500 in a ten-round unanimous decision in Detroit. Goldberg fell behind in the early rounds and didn't rally enough in the later rounds to offset Miller's lead on points. Though Goldberg was leading in betting by 2-1 before the bout, Miller won in an upset. Miller was a rising star in his own right, having won 21 consecutive bouts prior to facing Goldberg.

On May 18, 1945, nearing the end of his career, Goldberg defeated one of his better opponents, Luis Castillo in a ten-round unanimous decision for the Duration Bantamweight Title, at Legion Stadium in Hollywood. At the time, Castillo was the ranked fifth in the world among bantamweights. The LA Times gave Castillo only the third, fifth, and tenth, and a sizable points margin of 57 to 43. Goldberg's best round was the fourth, landing a flock of left hooks, and once again demonstrating an advantage with his Southpaw stance. Castillo was unable to get inside Goldberg's long right, which he had to defend against with his left, a more awkward arm for the more traditional right-handed Castillo.

Goldberg suffered from heat exhaustion in his last recorded bout, a decisive 10-round decision against Pedro Ramirez at Hollywood's Legion Stadium, on April 12, 1946. Goldberg sent Ramirez to the canvas twice in the second round with left hooks, but was unable to gain a win by knockout in the succeeding rounds. Ramirez doggedly attempted to win by knockout in several clashes, but each were broken up by Goldberg. Goldberg looked fatigued by the eighth round, though clearly retained the lead even in the tenth when both boxers fought a long rally for the decision. Shortly after the match, Goldberg fainted from exhaustion in his corner.

== Retirement from boxing ==
After Benny's retirement from boxing, he went into the motion picture industry and worked as a nightclub comic, Master of Ceremonies, boxing promoter, ring announcer, and press agent. He also worked for the movie studios as a body guard for actors that included Vince Edwards, Tony Curtis, and Robert Blake. His best known television roles included Ben Casey (1961) and Cannon (1971).

His movie work featured him often as a boxer or referee. He appeared as a boxer in the movie "All Fall Down" (1962), as a prisoner in "Al Capone" (1959), as a boxer in "Fight for the Title" (1957), as a boxer in "Telephone Time (TV)" (1957), as a referee in "The Harder They Fall", (1956), as an uncredited boxer in "Kid Monk Baroni" (1952), and as a fighter in "Fighting Fools (1949)."

He died on September 29, 2001, in Los Angeles, and was buried in Mount Sinai Memorial Park Cemetery.

In 2003 he was inducted into the Southern California Jewish Sports Hall of Fame.

== Selected fights ==
9 Wins, 1 Loss
Result	Opponent(s)	Date	Location	Duration	Notes
Win	Manuel Ortiz	Feb 25, 1938	Los Angeles	4 Rounds	-
Win	Manuel Ortiz	Aug 5, 1938	Los Angeles	4 Rounds	-
Win	Charley Parham	Jun 18, 1940	Detroit	10 Round TKO	Won USA Michigan State Bantam Title
Win	Abe Denner	Apr 27, 1942	Detroit	10 Rounds	Denner - Bantam contender
Win	Joey Archibald	Jul 21, 1942	Toledo, OH	10 Round TKO	Was former World feather Champ
Win	Lou Transparenti	Dec 14, 1942	Detroit	4th Round KO	Was major World bantam Contender
Win	Tony Oliveri	Apr 30, 1943	Hollywood	10 Rounds MD	-
Loss	Manuel Ortiz	Nov 23, 1943	Los Angeles	15 Round UD	For World Bantam Title
Win	Luis Castillo	May 18, 1945	Los Angeles	10 Rounds UD	Won Duration Bantam Title
Win	Pedro Ramirez	April 12, 1946	Hollywood	10 Rounds UD	Last fight
