= David Kui Kong Young =

Chinese boxer

Personal information
- Nickname: The Clouting Celestial
- Nationality: China
- Born: December 5, 1916 Honolulu, Hawaii, U.S.
- Died: December 29, 2012 (aged 96)
- Weight: Bantamweight

Boxing career
- Stance: Southpaw

Boxing record
- Total fights: 99
- Wins: 70
- Win by KO: 41
- Losses: 17
- Draws: 12
- No contests: 0

David Kui Kong Young (December 5, 1916 – December 29, 2012) was a Chinese boxer. His career W-L-D record was 70–17–12.

Kui Kong Young fought Jackie Wilson in two straight fight in Australia. Young lost both fights. The first fight he lost by DQ. The second fight he lost by decision. Young fought Little Dado three times. The first fight Young won by decision at the Honolulu Stadium. The second fight David won again by decision at the Honolulu Stadium. The third fight was for the World Bantamweight Title only recognized by the Hawaiian Territorial Boxing Commission and Young won again this time by TKO at the Honolulu Stadium. Young defended the World Bantamweight Title against Manuel Ortiz, who won by split decision in Honolulu, Hawaii.
