= Small Montana =

Filipino boxer

Personal information
- Nationality: (Philippines) Filipino
- Born: Benjamin Ladesma Gan; February 24, 1912 Bacolod, Negros Occidental, Philippines
- Died: August 4, 1976 (aged 63) La Carlota, Negros Occidental, Philippines
- Height: 5 ft 4 in (1.63 m)
- Weight: Flyweight

Boxing career
- Stance: Orthodox

Boxing record
- Total fights: 118
- Wins: 83
- Win by KO: 18
- Losses: 24
- Draws: 10

Benjamin Ledesma Gan (February 24, 1912 – August 4, 1976), known professionally as Small Montana, was a Filipino boxer.

Montana, who stood 5 feet and 4 inch (163 cm) tall and never weighed more than 112 pounds, won the Flyweight Championship of the World (as recognized by New York state).

== Fighting style ==
Montana was known for his quick punches, although he was a scrappy and not very tall fighter; he had not the KO punch but was speedy and clever. Montana scored just 13 knockouts in 83 professional wins.

== Early life ==
Benjamin Gan was born in Bacolod, Negros Occidental, Philippines, on February 24, 1913, a son of the local chief of police father Teodhore Gan, He was of Chinese descent and Marinella Jamito, She was an office clerk and was the oldest five children. In 1920 Gan began his studying at age 6, he attend of Rizal Elementary School and he completed of the sixth grade, and until the fourth year high school at age 17 of Negros Occidental High School in Bacolod.

Gan grew up after high school at age 17, He was also a skilled blacksmith with the passion for boxing and was inspired by the fights of Pancho Villa. He carried a photo of Guilledo in his wallet at all times. At a young age, Gan changed his name to Small Montana ("little mountain") and ran away from home to become a professional boxer in 1932 at age 18.

== Professional career ==
He won the American Flyweight Title by beating Midget Wolgast twice in 1935. He also went abroad to defend his title, but lost to Benny Lynch in a 15-round bout in London on January 9, 1937.

He also tried to fight for a world championship but fell short in all his world title matches. During his career he fought Little Dado and Little Pancho (half-brother of Francisco Guilledo) but lost to both of them on points.

He defeated Manuel Ortiz, Midget Wolgast, Tony Marino, Joe Tei Ken, Speedy Dado, Tommy Forte, Augie Curtis, Pat Palmer, Frankie Jarr, Eugene "Tuffy" Pierpont and Antol "Tony" Kocsis.
