= Kaiser Center for the Arts =

Building in California, United States

Henry J. Kaiser Center for the Arts
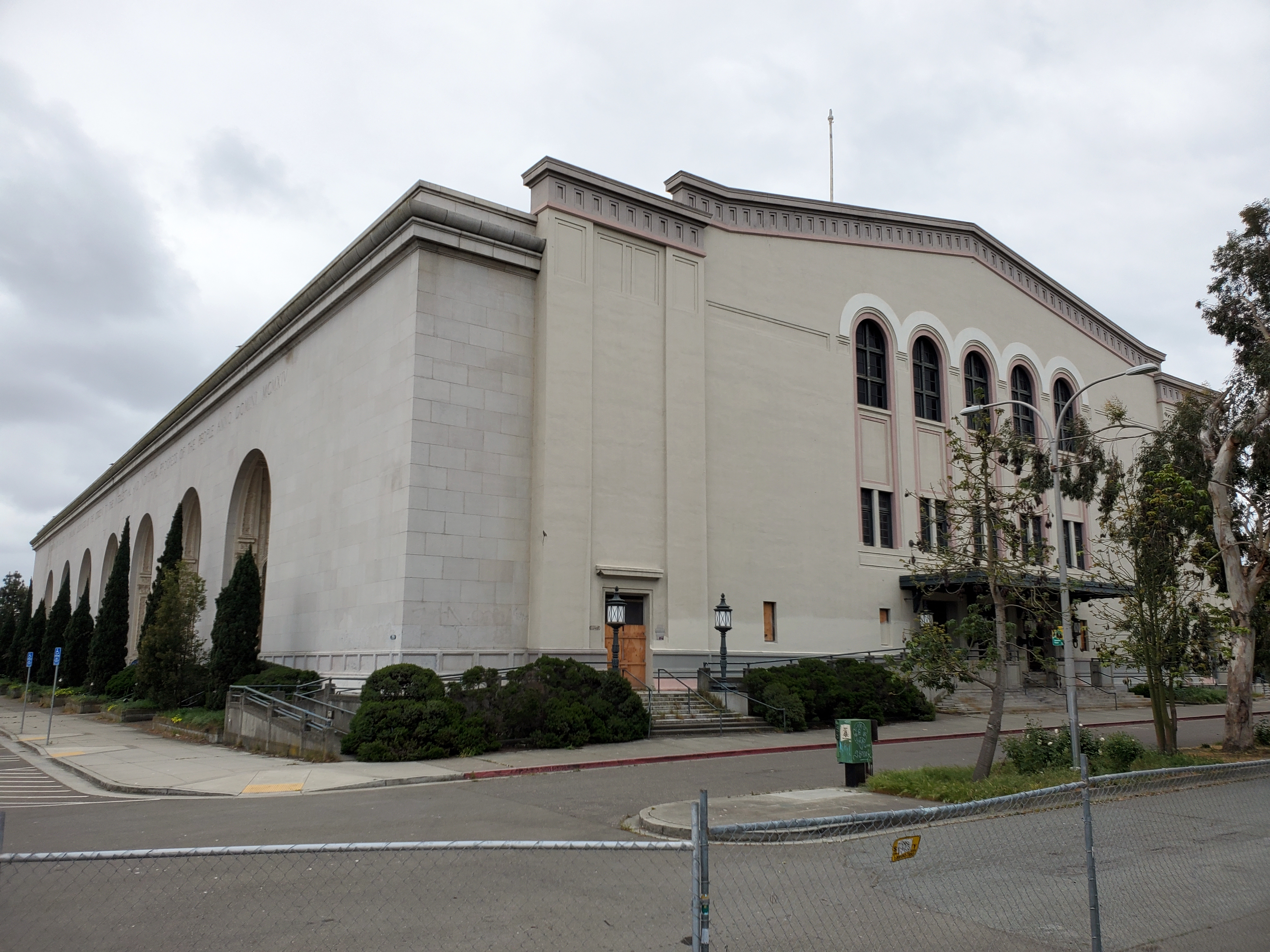
- Kaiser Convention Center in April 2021
- Former names: Oakland Civic Auditorium (1914-84), Kaiser Convention Center (1984–2023)

General information
- Architectural style: Beaux Arts
- Location: 10 10th Street, Oakland, California
- Coordinates: 37°47′51″N 122°15′42″W
- Completed: 1914

Design and construction
- Architect: John J. Donovan

Oakland Designated Landmark
- Designated: 1979
- Reference no.: 27

The Henry J. Kaiser Center for the Arts is a historic, publicly owned multi-purpose building located in Oakland, California. Originally known as the Oakland Civic Auditorium, it was renamed in honor of Henry J. Kaiser following a 1984 renovation, and was renamed as the Henry J. Kaiser Center for the Arts in 2023. Heller Manus Architects led the building’s seismic retrofit and renovation.

The Beaux-Arts style landmark was completed in 1915. The architect was John J. Donovan. The structural engineer was Maurice Couchot. The facility includes a 72,000sf, 5,492-seat arena, 1,500 seats Calvin Simmons Theatre, and a large ballroom. The building is #27 on the list of Oakland Historic Landmarks., and was listed on the National Register of Historic Places in 2021.

The building is located at 10 10th Street, in the Civic Center district of the city. It is next to the Oakland Museum, Laney College, Lake Merritt, and near the Lake Merritt BART station.

== History ==
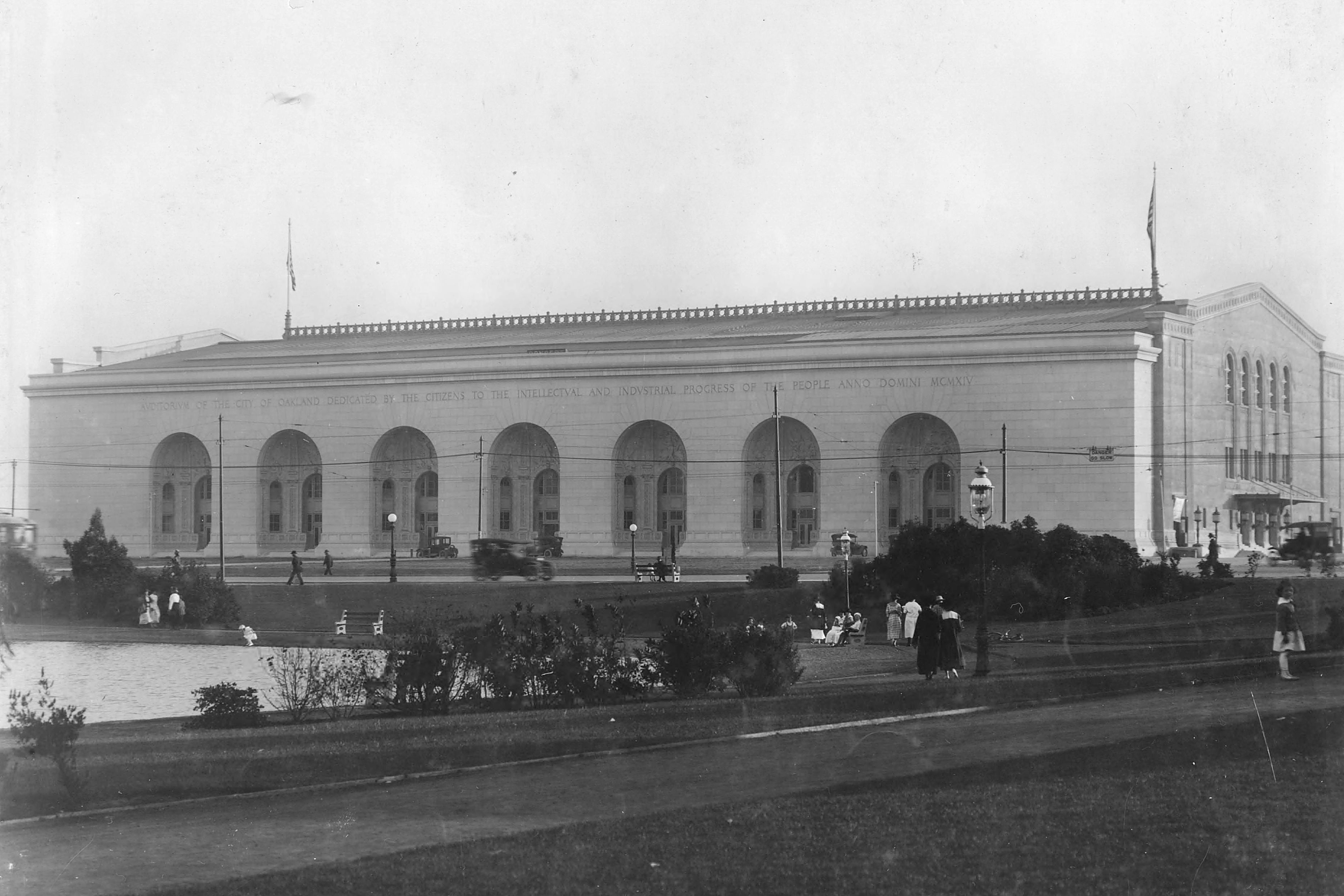
Oakland Civic Auditorium around 1917

In the wake of the 1906 San Francisco earthquake and fire, the City of Oakland entered a period of rapid growth. The Oakland Auditorium was constructed between 1913 and 1915 as one of many public and private projects planned during that growth period. The Oakland City Hall, another major civic building, was completed in 1914. The Oakland Auditorium was originally planned as a convention center, and in 1912 a $500,000 bond was issued for the project.

The development team included: John J. Donovan, the supervising architect; Henry F. Hornbostel, the consulting architect; Alexander Stirling Calder, the sculptor; N. Clark & Son, the terra cotta supplier; and Maurice C. Couchot, as consulting engineer. Alexander Stirling Calder, a nationally renowned sculptor, designed the sculptural reliefs in the niches on the north façade. Couchot designed the trussed roof specifically to reduce the overall weight of the roof.

After the approval of the bonds, the project scope was expanded to include the theatre, art gallery, ballroom, and other spaces. Without an increase in funds to cover the costs of these new components, the project went over budget. In 1913, the City Council replaced Donovan as the supervising architect with Walter J. Mathews, reportedly due to the cost overruns. Nonetheless, the design of the building is credited to Donovan.

The Oakland Auditorium opened on April 30, 1915, with a 3-day celebration called “Dance of a Thousand Colors.” The opening of the Auditorium was expedited due to the timing of the 1915 Panama-Pacific International Exposition that opened in San Francisco on February 20, 1915. Until the 1960s, the Oakland Auditorium was the primary local facility for conventions and a variety of other large events.

With the opening of the Oakland Coliseum and Arena in 1966, the reopening of the 1931 Paramount Theatre in the 1970s, and George P. Scotland Convention Center at 10th and Broadway, events and performers were drawn away from the Oakland Auditorium.

Both the theatre and auditorium closed on January 1, 2006. Its future was uncertain for a decade. In 2006, Oakland voters defeated a ballot proposition advocating a library space in the building.

The facility was owned by the City of Oakland until 2011, when it was sold to the local redevelopment agency for $28 million. However, the redevelopment agency was dissolved by the State of California in 2012, so ownership reverted to the city of Oakland.

In 2017, the City of Oakland awarded a long-term lease to Orton Development Inc. (ODI) to renovate and operate the landmark 1913 Henry J. Kaiser Convention Center. Heller Manus Architects was selected to lead the building’s seismic retrofit and renovation.

The Calvin Simmons Theatre will return as a performing arts center, hosting live performances and providing event and practice spaces big and small for local arts organizations. The building’s basement will house music studios, makers’ spaces, and storage space for the Theatre and local arts organizations.

The arena space was originally planned to be office space, but in 2023 it reopened with its original function as event space. The Calvin Simmons Theatre was reopened in 2024.

== Notable events ==
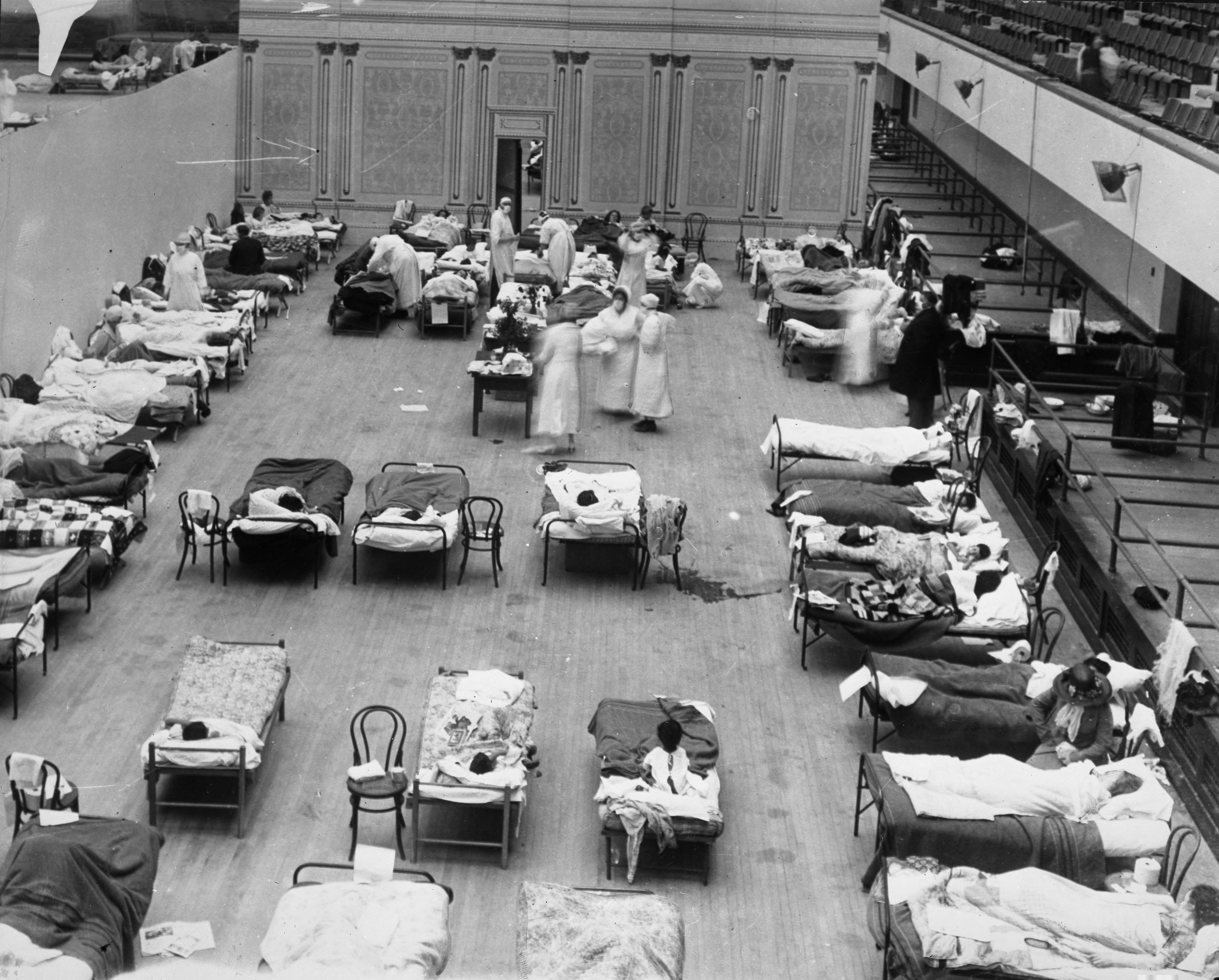
The auditorium used as a temporary hospital during the 1918 flu pandemic

During the 1918 flu pandemic the auditorium was used as a makeshift infirmary.

Until 1941, Kaiser Arena hosted the Ringling Brothers and Barnum and Bailey Circus. In 1942, the Circus moved across the bay to the San Francisco Civic Auditorium and then in the mid-1960s to the Cow Palace.

In the 1950s and 1960s the Roller Derby played there hundreds of times. The auditorium hosted the Oakland Symphony Orchestra until 1972, and the arena was home to the Oakland Skates roller hockey team in 1996.

For almost 70 years, from 1919 until 1987, the arena was home to the annual Christmas Pageant (later the Oakland Children's Holiday Pageant) involving at least 1,700 youngsters from 70 city schools. The organizer, professional ballerina and dance teacher Louise Jorgensen, went to each school to train the children for their role as elves, toys, poinsettias or fairies.

Elvis Presley performed at the convention center on June 3, 1956, and again on October 27, 1957.

On December 28, 1962, Martin Luther King Jr. spoke to an audience of 7,000 at the auditorium to mark the 100th anniversary of the Emancipation Proclamation.

Ike & Tina Turner performed at the Oakland Auditorium on January 13, 1967.

From 1967 through 1989, the Grateful Dead, an American rock band, performed at the convention center 57 times. Their first 23 concerts at the convention center were billed at "Oakland Auditorium", and later, starting in 1985, the venue changed to "Henry J. Kaiser Convention Center". In the 80's the band started performing "runs" of shows over the course of three to seven days.

On November 23, 1969, Western swing pioneer and TV personality Spade Cooley received a 72-hour furlough from Vacaville prison to play a benefit concert for the Deputy Sheriffs Association of Alameda County. During the intermission, after a standing ovation, he died of a heart attack. He was to be paroled on February 22, 1970.

On November 30, 1979, Bob Marley and the Wailers played at the Oakland Auditorium on the Survival Tour.

On August 6, 1988, the arena hosted a stop of NWA wrestling's Great American Bash tour. The Main Event featured a WarGames match between The Four Horsemen and the team of Dusty Rhodes, Lex Luger, and The Road Warriors and Paul Ellering.

Megadeth played an ill-fated show on March 10, 1988, in which frontman Dave Mustaine was severely intoxicated and began ranting against his former band Metallica (who were present at the show), and began verbally assaulting several audience members. He would also go on to denounce Metallica bassist Jason Newsted, and replacement guitarist Kirk Hammett.

On the evening of October 20, 1991 as the bands Anthrax, Public Enemy and Primus performed inside while across Lake Merritt the flames of the Oakland firestorm of 1991 were clearly visible from the hall's entrance as Bill Graham stood and greeted patrons at the top of the entry a mere five days before his untimely death.

From 1997 to 1999 the arena played host to the University of California, Berkeley's women's basketball team while the team's on-campus venue, Haas Pavilion, was being renovated.

In January 2012 Occupy Oakland marched on the facility, stating their intent to reclaim this abandoned space for the people, but were kept away by police. The action and subsequent incidents that day resulted in over 400 arrests by the Oakland Police Department and in an undetermined cost to the city due to damage and vandalism.

In March 2022, the unidentified, mummified body of a man was found within a wall of the building during renovations, which was later identified as that of a 44-year-old homeless man who had been missing since August 2020.

On March 26, 2024, Robert F. Kennedy, Jr. held a rally to announce his Vice Presidential running mate Nicole Shanahan in front of an audience of several hundred.

== Architecture ==
The Henry J. Kaiser Center for the Arts is a large rectangular, Beaux Arts style building at the southern end of Lake Merritt near downtown Oakland, California. Beaux Arts style elements that are present include the simple orderliness of the exterior, classical massing, monumental scale, symmetrical facades, light-colored masonry walls, and decorative elements such as pilasters, garlands, and floral details. The building has a side-gabled roof with decorative parapets that extend slightly above the roofline.

The building measures approximately four hundred feet long by two hundred feet across. The building has four floors, including the basement, that are accessed primarily by a system of ramps; stairs and elevators are also present. The building was designed and constructed to house both an arena and a theatre plus other assembly spaces, including ballrooms. The east end of the building houses the arena and the west end the theatre.

The stage between the arena and theatre was originally designed to serve both and also allowed for the stage to lower to connect the two spaces. The building is steel frame and reinforced concrete construction, with a three-hinged arch roof truss system at the arena roof. Its principal, north façade is monolithic, with granite cladding and a series of monumental niches that house entry ways with allegorical vaults rendered in terra cotta.

== Site ==
The Henry J. Kaiser Center for the Arts, having been originally sited within a lakeside park, has an expansive frontage that is generally associated with a range of other nearby civic buildings, including the Oakland Museum of California, Laney Community College, the Alameda County Superior Courthouse and Administrative Building, and the Oakland Public Library. The Oakland Auditorium primary (north) façade is oriented toward Lake Merritt.

The east and west façades are set back and include entrances to the Calvin Simmons Theatre on the east and the Arena on the west. The building’s architectural design faces Lake Merritt. The 10th Street façade on the south side includes a historic service entrance.

== Building exterior ==
The north façade of the Henry J. Kaiser Center for the Arts faces north towards Lake Merritt with a monumental, symmetrical and sculptural wall. Its monolithic granite face is punctuated by seven arched openings that contain half-vaulted entry vestibule niches.

Each of the seven entrance niches contain a monumental exedra that is elaborately decorated with sculptural reliefs made from terra cotta. Collectively the works are titled the “Riches of the Earth.” Each of the seven designs presents a unique scene, each with its own subtheme and title. From east to west – “The Joy of the Effort,” “Consolation of Arts,” “Wealth of the Earth,” The Wealth of the Mind,” “Wealth of the Sea,” “The Duties of Life,” and “Gifts of the Air.”

Each niche is broken into three parts, or bays, with four composite style pilasters delineating the central entrance and flanking window bays in each niche. The pictorial scenes include figures that depict the theme. For example, the “Consolation of Arts” has figures playing music, creating sculptures, and performing a theatrical piece. Some typical classical details are consistently used throughout all the niches and include decorative garland (fruit, floral, and leaf), floral panels, bands of egg and dart molding, as well as bands of geometric designs around the window and door openings.

== See also ==
- List of convention centers in the United States
