= California State Athletic Commission =

US state sports governing body

California State Athletic Control Board

Agency overview
- Jurisdiction: California
- Headquarters: 2005 Evergreen Street, Suite 2010, Sacramento, CA 95815
- Agency executives: Peter Villegas, Chairman; Vernon Williams, Vice-Chairman; Andy Foster, Executive Officer
- Parent agency: California Department of Consumer Affairs
- Website: Official Site

Footnotes
- Commissioners Michael Hardeman, Doug Hendrickson

The California State Athletic Commission (CSAC) is a state government agency that regulates amateur and professional boxing, amateur and professional kickboxing, and professional mixed martial arts (MMA) throughout California by licensing all participants and supervising the events. CSAC operates under California's Department of Consumer Affairs.

In May 2017, CSAC implemented a 10-point plan against extreme weight-cutting inclusive of fine fighters who missed contracted fight weights, missed weight fighters may ask to move to higher weight class, a 30-day and 10-day weight check for “high level title fights among others On October 25, 2019 CSAC passed a vote of 5–0 on cancelling a fight if fighters weighted more than 15% above their contracted fight weight on the day of the event.

== See also ==
- Association of Boxing Commissions
- Mixed martial arts rules
