= Jackie Jurich =

American boxer

Personal information
- Nickname: Rose of San Jose
- Nationality: American
- Born: Jackie Jurich California, USA

Boxing career

Boxing record
- Total fights: 84
- Wins: 61
- Win by KO: 22
- Losses: 14
- Draws: 9

Jackie Jurich was an American former professional boxer. He is also known by his nickname "Rose of San Jose."

== Professional career ==
Jurich claimed the World Flyweight Title, after he was scheduled to face then World champion Benny Lynch in a title fight. When Lynch came in over the weight limit, Jurich's manager laid claim to the title. This was despite the fact that Jurich was knocked out by Lynch in the overweight bout.

Jurich would soon after lose a bout to Peter Kane, which is generally recognized as for being for the vacant World Flyweight Title.

== Personal life ==
After retiring from boxing, Jurich lived in San Francisco with his brother and worked as a janitor Local #9 San Francisco at Bay Meadows and Golden Gate Fields from the 1960s through the 1970s. Jackie Jurich is survived by his daughter Lili Balfour, her brother Paul Balfour, and their extended families.
