= Sixto Escobar =

Puerto Rican boxer (1913-1979)

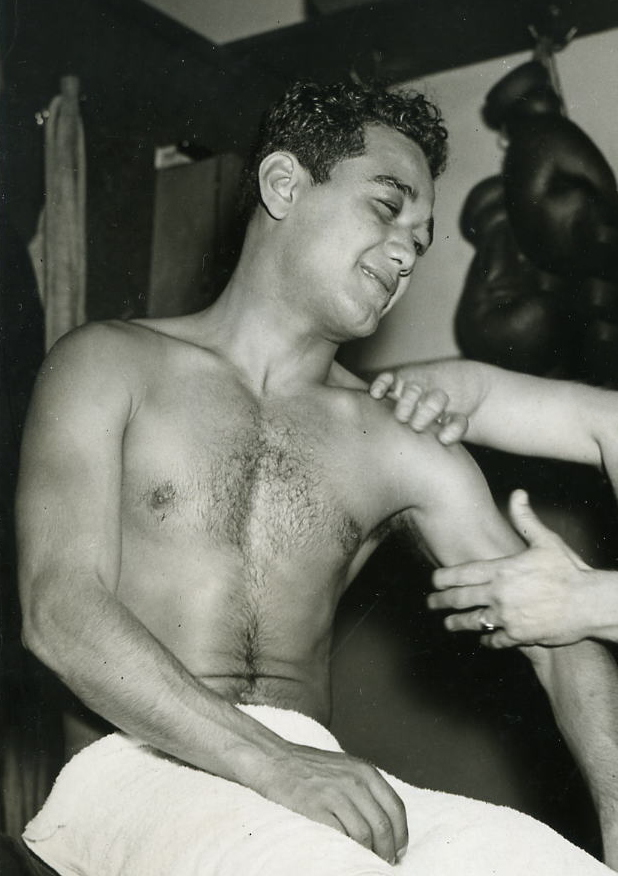
- Escobar in the 1930s

Personal information
- Nickname: El Gallito
- Nationality: Puerto Rican
- Born: Sixto Escobar Vargas; March 23, 1913 Barceloneta, Puerto Rico
- Died: November 17, 1979 (aged 66) Barceloneta, Puerto Rico
- Height: 5 ft 4 in (163 cm)
- Weight: Bantamweight

Boxing career
- Stance: Orthodox

Boxing record
- Total fights: 66
- Wins: 39
- Win by KO: 17
- Losses: 23
- Draws: 4
- No contests: 0

Sixto Escobar (March 23, 1913 – November 17, 1979) was a Puerto Rican professional boxer. Competing in the bantamweight division, he was Puerto Rico's first world champion and a two-time Undisputed Bantamweight World Champion.

Escobar was born in Barceloneta and raised in San Juan. There he received his primary education and took interest in boxing. After gathering a record of 21–1–1 as an amateur, Escobar debuted as a professional in 1931 defeating Luis "Kid Dominican" Pérez by knockout. Early in his career, he moved to Venezuela due to the lack of opponents in his division. There he received an opportunity for the Venezuelan Bantamweight championship, but lost by points to Enrique Chaffardet. Subsequently, he moved to New York and began boxing in other states, eventually capturing the Montreal Athletic Commission World Bantamweight Title. In 1936, he defeated Tony Marino to unify this championship with the one recognized by the International Boxing Union, in the process becoming the third Latin American undisputed world boxing champion. After retiring, he worked as a spokesperson for beer companies in New York, before returning to Puerto Rico in the 1960s, where he resided until his death. He received several posthumous recognitions and his name was used in several sports venues and buildings. In 2002, Escobar was inducted into the International Boxing Hall of Fame.

== Early life and amateur career ==
Escobar was born in La Boca in Barrio Palmas Altas, a sector of Barceloneta, Puerto Rico, to Jacinto Escobar and Adela Vargas. Early in his life, he moved to Tras Talleres in Santurce, a subsection of San Juan, Puerto Rico. There he received his elementary and secondary education, up until the seventh grade, when he decided to dedicate himself full-time to his sports career. In Tras Talleres, he began developing an interest in boxing and received instruction in said discipline. Although at this time, boxing was illegal in Puerto Rico; remote places such as a house's backyard or rooftops were used to organize clandestine fights without attracting attention from the local police. In 1928, a Puerto Rican boxer named Ángel "Sotito" Soto moved from New York to a house near the Escobar family's residence and established a gym in his backyard. There he gave boxing classes to Escobar and several other young athletes. After several months of instruction, Soto prepared a boxing card with included three-round fights, in which each round lasted two minutes. In this event, Escobar earned his first victory, defeating a pugilist identified as "Gombar" by knockout in the first round. After this match, Escobar continued fighting in clandestine gyms. He met and was received by Ignacio Peñagaricano, the owner of Victoria Gym. Escobar received his boxing license through Peñagaricano. On February 16, 1927, governor Horace Mann Towner legalized boxing and allowed the establishment of organized boxing matches. Professionals would fight Fridays, Saturdays and Sundays which, were considered the best days of the week, while amateurs could compete the remaining days of the week without limitations. As an amateur, he fought in 23 combats, gathering a record of 21 wins, one loss and a draw. His draw was against Ramón Rodríguez of San Lorenzo and his only loss was in the hands of Pedro Montañez from Cayey, in a fight that took place in March 1930.

== Professional career ==
Escobar turned professional on September 1, 1930, in a fight card organized at the Victory Garden gym in San Juan. In this event, he defeated Luis "Kid Dominican" Pérez, who entered the fight as the Dominican Republic's champion, by knockout in the third round. In Puerto Rico, Escobar fought in 15 contests, before moving to Venezuela after the popularity of professional boxing declined in his home country. This move was motivated by Roberto Andrade, who provided transportation to the country. In Venezuela, he fought in Caracas, competing against José Lugo, Sindulfo Díaz, Rafael "Moralito" Morales, Pica Pica and Simón Chávez among others. On November 11, 1931, Escobar competed against Enrique Chaffardet for the Venezuelan Bantamweight Title, but lost by decision. After 17 fights, he returned to Puerto Rico and competed in five cards. But professional boxing suffered another decline in interest, which forced Escobar to work as an accommodator in baseball games three days of the week, generally on weekends. In the meanwhile, Tony Rojas, a friend of his managers Gustavo Jiménez and Arturo Gigante, convinced them to release Escobar of the contract which bound them. Since Escobar turned professional while he was still legally a minor, his father had to sign the unbinding agreement. After succeeding in this task, Rojas presented Escobar with a steam boat ticket to New York, which covered his food, clothes and hotel expenses. Escobar reached New York in early 1934, intending to "obtain fame and honor" for "[his] motherland", there he was received by Rojas and professional trainer Whitey Bimstein. His first fight in the United States took place at the Valley Arena in Holyoke, Massachusetts on May 7, 1934. In this contest he was paired against Canadian bantamweight titleholder Bobby Leitham, defeating him by technical knockout in the seventh round.

Escobar's manager, Lou Brix and his trainer recognized that Escobar could be close to a championship fight once the incumbent, Panamian Alfonso Teófilo Brown, refused to defend the championship against the first contender, which led to it being stripped by the National Boxing Association (NBA). A rematch was then organized against Leitham. This was an eliminatory card organized by the Montreal Athletic Commission, which was to determine a contender for their vacant Bantamweight World Championship, against first contender Baby Casanova, who attended the card. After scoring three knockdowns in the fourth round, Escobar connected another punch that injured Leitham, after which Leitham's manager surrendered the fight. This marked Leitham's last fight. Following this result, the NBA immediately called for a fight between Escobar and Casanova. By this time he had gained a reputation as a quick and technical boxer, capable of gathering quick knockouts with body punches if confronted by an unprepared opponent. The fight took place on June 26, 1934, and it was organized in Montreal, Quebec, Canada. Escobar scored a knockdown in the third round; the fight concluded in the ninth round when Casanova lost by knockout. With this win, Escobar won the Montreal Athletic Commission World Bantamweight Title, thus becoming the first Puerto Rican to win a world boxing championship title. This had a significant impact on Puerto Rico, where it was constantly discussed by the general public. Songs, decimas and poetry were written about this accomplishment. However, the New York State Athletic Commission (NYSAC) and International Boxing Union (IBU) of France didn't recognize the outcome of this fight, conserving Tony Marino and Brown as their recognized champions.

=== Undisputed world bantamweight title ===
On August 8, 1934, he defeated Eugene Hart by points in a non-title match organized in Canada. This was the first time in his career that Escobar completed a 15-round contest. After this event, he stayed in Montreal expecting to fight against the winner of a matchup between Louis Salica and Bobby Quintana, which was scheduled to take place on December of that year. However, Escobar was forced to cancel his plans after suffering a heel injury when he was hit by a car. He spent a month in inactivity while recovering, and in the winter he returned to Puerto Rico. The governor ordered to have all government buildings closed so that public employees could attend a welcoming ceremony. The event, which took place in Old San Juan's dock, was followed by a parade. Upon arriving in Barceloneta, Escobar was recognized as a "predilect son" of that municipality by the city's mayor, which was followed by a week of festivities in his name. Escobar pursued a fight with Brown, but his offers were refused while the Panamanian pugilist promoted a campaign protesting the removal of his recognition as champion, demanding to be reinstated.

On August 7, 1935, Escobar defeated Pete Sanstol—who once held, in 1931, the Canadian Boxing Federation and Montreal Athletic Commission (MAC) world bantamweight titles—by unanimous decision in 12 rounds. However, Escobar still wasn't considered the division's Undisputed Champion because Balthazar Sangchili had defeated Panama Al Brown and was recognized by the IBU. Due to this, Sanstol sent a letter to the NYSAC noting that the fight was of eliminatory nature, even though it was recognized as a titular contest by the NBA and MAC. Wanting to be recognized as such, Escobar pursued a title unification fight against Tony Marino, who had defeated Sangchili by knockout in his previous fight. He won the fight by knockout in the thirteenth round, receiving the "undisputed world champion" distinction. On November 13, 1935, Escobar became the first Puerto Rican to win a title fight in the first round, defeating "Indian" Quintana by knockout.

This outcome made it possible to organize a fight against Louis Salica, it was the first time that Escobar fought a title fight in Puerto Rico. The card was promoted by Arturo Gigante and Gustavo Jiménez Sicardó. Escobar won the fight by unanimous decision, while Jack Dempsey served as referee. He participated in Mike Jacobs's "Carnival of Champions" on September 23, 1937 and lost the title to Harry Jeffra by unanimous decision. Shortly after, he recovered from this loss and he returned to the gym; he defeated Johnny Defoe in a preparatory contest. On February 20, 1938, Escobar faced Jeffra in a rematch organized at the El Escambrón baseball park in Puerta de Tierra. He won the contest by unanimous decision, scoring three knockdowns. This became an early example of fights that attracted the attention and criticism of boxing analysts, particularly those in New York. On April 2, 1939, Escobar defeated Kayo Morgan before a sold-out crowd of 15,000 at the Estadio Sixto Escobar, which had been inaugurated three years earlier. After this fight, he received The Ring Bantamweight Championship, which was presented by the magazine's editor, Nat Fleischer. Later in 1939, Escobar received a draft notice from the United States Army, ordering him to take a physical exam for possible military service. He and his manager presented the issue to the Puerto Rico Boxing Commission, managing to receive a postponement of two months before surrendering his title. On April 6, 1940, Escobar fought Simón Chávez for ten rounds in what ended as a draw. Escobar then fought some short non-title fights, of which he lost four, all by points. On December 2, 1940, Escobar participated in his last professional fight, losing to a ten-round decision to Harry Jeffra. Throughout his career Escobar avoided being knocked down or out in any fight, all of his losses being by decision. In April 1941, he was drafted to the United States Army and participated in World War II obtaining the rank of Technician fifth grade.

== Retirement, death and legacy ==
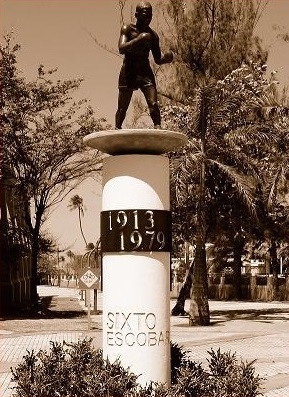
Statue of Sixto Escobar, located in front of the Sixto Escobar Stadium in Old San Juan, Puerto Rico

After his military service, Escobar confronted problems to meet the bantamweight's limit and retired. He became a spokesman for a liquor brand and relocated to New York temporally, with his family. Subsequently, he returned to Puerto Rico where he worked selling liquor in bars. In May 1947, Escobar and Jiménez Sicardó co-promoted a fight with the intention of bringing fans back to boxing. In the main event, Diego Sosa was matched against Francisco Colón García. Escobar was inducted into the Madison Square Garden's Boxing Hall of Fame in 1950. Escobar continued in his job as a liquor salesperson, during which it was common for liquor salesmen to drink a little bit of the product which they sold in front of potential customers. This contributed to the development of Escobar's alcoholic tendencies. His alcoholism would later combine with his diabetes and contribute to his death when he was 66 years old. Weeks before his death, Escobar participated in his last ceremony, where Diego Suárez, president of V. Suárez & Company. gave him a recognition.

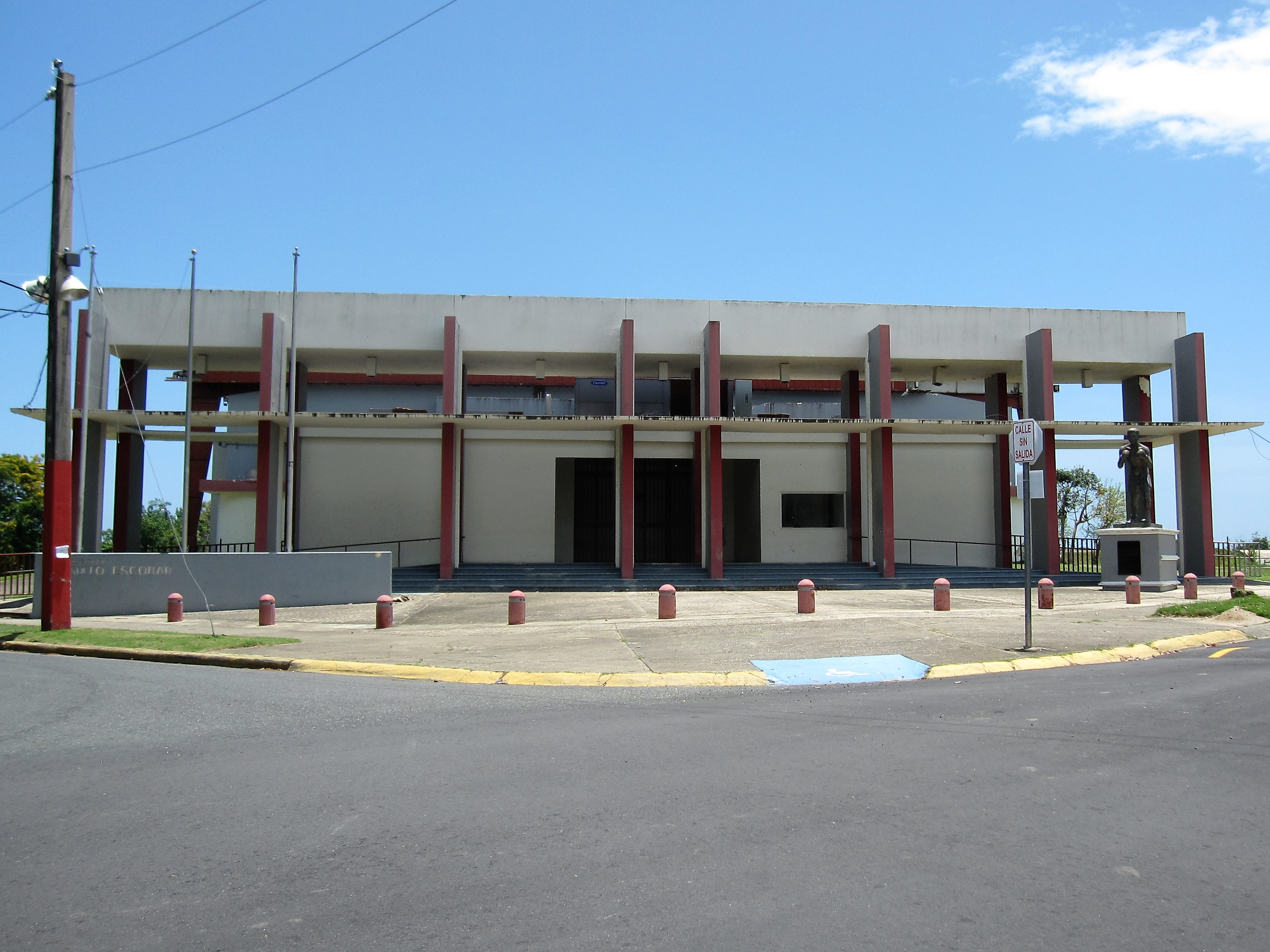
Auditorio Sixto Escobar in Barceloneta, Puerto Rico

After his death, the town of Barceloneta honored his memory by a statue. His remains are interred at Cementerio Municipal Viejo in Barceloneta, Puerto Rico, according to a memorial written to honor his life. Escobar became the first world boxing champion in history to have a statue in his honor. On June 9, 2002, Escobar was inducted into the International Boxing Hall of Fame. He became the fourth Puerto Rican to receive this distinction and the first to be included in the "Old Timers" section. In March 2005, a second statue of Estobar was unveiled at the Estadio Sixto Escobar in San Juan. Among the celebrities that attended the ceremony were former boxing world champions Julian Solís and Alfredo Escalera. This statue's location served as a remembrance tribute during the 94th anniversary of Escobar's birth, when a flower crown was placed at its feet. During this date, an activity was presented by Puerto Rico's House of Boxing in the library of the Pabellón de la Fama del Deporte Puertorriqueño. Among those who attended the ceremony were Solís, Escalera and Iván Calderón. On this date, People Inc. presented a documentary covering his life, which was donated to the venue. Several buildings and streets were named after Escobar posthumously, including the Auditorio Sixto Escobar. The house where he lived was later turned into a library and museum bearing his name.

In 2019 Sixto Escobar was posthumously inducted to the Puerto Rico Veterans Hall of Fame.

== Professional boxing record ==
66 fights	39 wins	23 losses
By knockout	17	0
By decision	22	23
Draws	4	

No.	Result	Record	Opponent	Type	Round	Date	Location	Notes
66	Loss	39–23–4	Harry Jeffra	PTS	10	Dec 2, 1940	Carlin's Park, Baltimore, Maryland, U.S.	
65	Draw	39–22–4	Simon Chavez	PTS	10	Apr 6, 1940	Nuevo Circo, Caracas, Venezuela	
64	Loss	39–22–3	Frankie Covelli	SD	10	Dec 11, 1939	Duquesne Garden, Pittsburgh, Pennsylvania, U.S.	
63	Loss	39–21–3	Tony Olivera	PTS	10	Oct 4, 1939	Auditorium, Oakland, California, U.S.	
62	Loss	39–20–3	Jimmy Perrin	UD	10	Aug 14, 1939	Municipal Auditorium, New Orleans, Louisiana, U.S.	
61	Loss	39–19–3	Frankie Bove	PTS	8	Jul 25, 1939	Belmont Park, Garfield, New Jersey, U.S.	
60	Win	39–18–3	Young Johnny Buff	PTS	8	Jul 7, 1939	Morris County Arena, Mount Freedom, New Jersey, U.S.	
59	Win	38–18–3	K.O. Morgan	UD	15	Apr 2, 1939	Escambron Baseball Park, San Juan, Puerto Rico	Retained NYSAC, NBA, and The Ring bantamweight titles
58	Loss	37–18–3	Al Mancini	UD	10	Dec 19, 1938	Turner's Arena, Washington, D.C., U.S.	
57	Loss	37–17–3	Henry Hook	PTS	10	Nov 1, 1938	Maple Leaf Gardens, Toronto, Ontario, Canada	
56	Win	37–16–3	Lou Transparenti	UD	10	Sep 5, 1938	Carlin's Park, Baltimore, Maryland, U.S.	
55	Loss	36–16–3	Nat Litfin	SD	10	May 4, 1938	Hippodrome, New York City, New York, U.S.	
54	Loss	36–15–3	K.O. Morgan	UD	10	Apr 19, 1938	Arena Gardens, Detroit, Michigan, U.S.	
53	Win	36–14–3	Harry Jeffra	UD	15	Feb 20, 1938	Escambron Baseball Park, San Juan, Puerto Rico	Won NYSAC, NBA, and The Ring bantamweight titles
52	Draw	35–14–3	Johnny DeFoe	PTS	8	Nov 13, 1937	Ridgewood Grove, Brooklyn, New York City, New York, U.S.	
51	Loss	35–14–2	Harry Jeffra	UD	15	Sep 23, 1937	Polo Grounds, New York City, New York, U.S.	Lost NYSAC, NBA, and The Ring bantamweight titles
50	Win	35–13–2	Eddie Reed	KO	8 (10)	Sep 1, 1937	South Park Arena, Hartford, Connecticut, U.S.	
49	Win	34–13–2	Georgie Holmes	TKO	3 (8)	Jul 21, 1937	Dyckman Oval, Manhattan, New York City, New York, U.S.	
48	Win	33–13–2	Pat Robertson	TKO	8 (10)	Jun 21, 1937	Marigold Gardens Outdoor Arena, Chicago, Illinois, U.S.	
47	Win	32–13–2	Nicky Jerome	TKO	2 (10)	May 12, 1937	Hippodrome, New York City, New York, U.S.	
46	Win	31–13–2	Lou Salica	UD	15	Feb 21, 1937	Escambron Baseball Park, San Juan, Puerto Rico	Retained NYSAC, NBA, and The Ring bantamweight titles
45	Loss	30–13–2	Harry Jeffra	MD	10	Dec 9, 1936	Hippodrome, New York City, New York, U.S.	
44	Win	30–12–2	Indian Quintana	KO	1 (15)	Nov 13, 1936	Madison Square Garden, New York City, New York, U.S.	Retained NYSAC, NBA, and The Ring bantamweight titles
43	Loss	29–12–2	Harry Jeffra	SD	10	Oct 5, 1936	Carlin's Park, Baltimore, Maryland, U.S.	
42	Win	29–11–2	Tony Marino	TKO	13 (15)	Aug 31, 1936	Dyckman Oval, Manhattan, New York City, New York, U.S.	Retained NYSAC and NBA bantamweight titles; Won The Ring bantamweight title
41	Loss	28–11–2	Indian Quintana	UD	10	Jul 15, 1936	Queensboro Arena, New York City, New York, U.S.	
40	Win	28–10–2	Al Gillette	TKO	5 (10)	Feb 5, 1936	Escambron Baseball Park, San Juan, Puerto Rico	
39	Win	27–10–2	Lou Salica	UD	15	Nov 15, 1935	Madison Square Garden, New York City, New York, U.S.	Won NYSAC and NBA bantamweight titles
38	Loss	26–10–2	Lou Salica	MD	15	Aug 26, 1935	Dyckman Oval, Manhattan, New York City, New York, U.S.	Lost NBA bantamweight title For vacant NYSAC bantamweight title
37	Win	26–9–2	Pete Sanstol	UD	12	Aug 7, 1935	Forum, Montreal, Quebec, Canada	Won vacant NBA bantamweight title
36	Win	25–9–2	Johnny Bang	KO	5 (10)	Jun 21, 1935	Luna Park Arena, Brooklyn, New York City, New York, U.S.	
35	Win	24–9–2	Joey Archibald	TKO	6 (8)	May 28, 1935	Polo Grounds, New York City, New York, U.S.	
34	Loss	23–9–2	Juan Zurita	PTS	10	Mar 31, 1935	El Toreo de Cuatro Caminos, Mexico City, Distrito Federal, Mexico	
33	Win	23–8–2	Eugène Huat	UD	15	Aug 8, 1934	Forum, Montreal, Quebec, Canada	Retained Montreal Athletic Commission bantamweight title
32	Win	22–8–2	Rodolfo Casanova	KO	9 (15)	Jun 26, 1934	Forum, Montreal, Quebec, Canada	Won vacant Montreal Athletic Commission bantamweight title
31	Win	21–8–2	Bobby Leitham	TKO	5 (10)	Jun 6, 1934	Forum, Montreal, Quebec, Canada	
30	Win	20–8–2	Joey Archibald	UD	10	May 21, 1934	Valley Arena Gardens, Holyoke, Massachusetts, U.S.	
29	Win	19–8–2	Bobby Leitham	TKO	7 (10)	May 7, 1934	Valley Arena Gardens, Holyoke, Massachusetts, U.S.	
28	Draw	18–8–2	Felipe Andrade	PTS	10 (?)	Sep 15, 1933	Victory Garden Stadium, San Juan, Puerto Rico	
27	Win	18–8–1	Vicente Abadia	PTS	8	Aug 27, 1933	Victory Garden Stadium, San Juan, Puerto Rico	
26	Win	17–8–1	Ray Lulolo	PTS	8	Aug 13, 1933	Victory Garden Stadium, San Juan, Puerto Rico	
25	Win	16–8–1	KO Tiger	TKO	2 (8)	Jun 23, 1933	Victory Garden Stadium, San Juan, Puerto Rico	
24	Loss	15–8–1	Ely Arriaga	PTS	8	May 27, 1933	Caracas, Venezuela	
23	Win	15–7–1	Pedro Ruiz	PTS	10	May 12, 1933	Caracas, Venezuela	
22	Win	14–7–1	KO Tiger	PTS	8	Apr 8, 1933	Caracas, Venezuela	
21	Loss	13–7–1	Enrique Chaffardet	PTS	10	Feb 11, 1933	Caracas, Venezuela	
20	Draw	13–6–1	Enrique Chaffardet	PTS	10	Jan 9, 1933	Caracas, Venezuela	
19	Loss	13–6	Simon Chavez	PTS	10	Jul 31, 1932	Caracas, Venezuela	
18	Win	13–5	Enrique Mendoza	PTS	8	Jun 26, 1932	Caracas, Venezuela	
17	Win	12–5	Sindulfo Diaz	PTS	10	Jun 4, 1932	Caracas, Venezuela	
16	Loss	11–5	Jose Lago	PTS	8	Apr 23, 1932	Caracas, Venezuela	
15	Loss	11–4	Firpo Zuliano	PTS	12	Mar 19, 1932	Caracas, Venezuela	
14	Loss	11–3	Enrique Chaffardet	PTS	10	Nov 15, 1931	Caracas, Venezuela	For Venezuelan featherweight title
13	Win	11–2	Phil Tobias	PTS	10	Sep 13, 1931	Caracas, Venezuela	
12	Win	10–2	Abeol Alvarez	KO	5 (10)	Aug 9, 1931	Caracas, Venezuela	
11	Win	9–2	Firpo Zuliano	PTS	10	Jul 18, 1931	Caracas, Venezuela	
10	Win	8–2	Simon Chavez	PTS	10	Jun 28, 1931	Caracas, Venezuela	
9	Win	7–2	Rafael Morales	KO	2 (8)	May 17, 1931	Caracas, Venezuela	
8	Win	6–2	Isidoro Gonzalez	KO	5 (8)	May 3, 1931	Caracas, Venezuela	
7	Win	5–2	Rafael Morales	PTS	10	Feb 1, 1931	Victory Garden Stadium, San Juan, Puerto Rico	
6	Win	4–2	Ramon Rodriquez	PTS	4	Jan 16, 1931	Victory Garden Stadium, San Juan, Puerto Rico	
5	Loss	3–2	Rafael Morales	PTS	8	Jan 1, 1931	Victory Garden Stadium, San Juan, Puerto Rico	
4	Win	3–1	Ramon Rodriquez	PTS	6	Oct 5, 1930	Victory Garden Stadium, San Juan, Puerto Rico	
3	Loss	2–1	Luis Emilio Perez	PTS	4	Sep 12, 1930	Victory Garden Stadium, San Juan, Puerto Rico	
2	Win	2–0	Luis Emilio Perez	PTS	4	Aug 29, 1930	Victory Garden Stadium, San Juan, Puerto Rico	
1	Win	1–0	Luis Emilio Perez	TKO	2 (4)	Jul 17, 1930	Victory Garden Stadium, San Juan, Puerto Rico	

== Titles in boxing ==
=== Major world titles ===
- NYSAC bantamweight champion (118 lbs) (2×)
- NBA (WBA) bantamweight champion (118 lbs) (3×)

=== The Ring magazine titles ===
- The Ring bantamweight champion (118 lbs) (2×)

=== Regional/International titles ===
- Montreal Athletic Commission bantamweight champion (118 lbs)

=== Undisputed titles ===
- Undisputed bantamweight champion (2×)

== Boxing Hall of Fame ==
Puerto Ricans in the International Boxing Hall of Fame

Number	Name	Year inducted	Notes
1	Carlos Ortíz	1991	World Jr. Welterweight Champion 1959 June 12- 1960, September 1, WBA Lightweight Champion 1962 Apr 21 – 1965 Apr 10, WBC Lightweight Champion 1963 Apr 7 – 1965 Apr 10, WBC Lightweight Champion 1965 Nov 13 – 1968 Jun 29.
2	Wilfred Benítez	1994	The youngest world champion in boxing history. WBA Light Welterweight Champion 1976 Mar 6 – 1977, WBC Welterweight Champion 1979 Jan 14 – 1979 Nov 30, WBC Light Middleweight Champion.
3	Wilfredo Gómez	1995	WBC Super Bantamweight Champion 1977 May 21 – 1983, WBC Featherweight Champion 1984 Mar 31 – 1984 Dec 8, WBA Super Featherweight Champion 1985 May 19 – 1986 May 24.
4	José "Chegui" Torres	1997	Won a silver medal in the junior middleweight at the 1956 Olympic Games. Undisputed Light Heavyweight Champion 1965 Mar 30 – 1966 Dec 16
5	Sixto Escobar	2002	Puerto Rico's first boxing champion. World Bantamweight Champion 15 Nov 1935– 23 Sep 1937, World Bantamweight Champion 20 Feb 1938– Oct 1939
6	Edwin Rosario	2006	Ranks #36 on the list of "100 Greatest Punchers of All Time." according to Ring Magazine. WBC Lightweight Champion 1983 May 1 – 1984 Nov 3, WBA Lightweight Champion 1986 Sep 26 – 1987 Nov 21, WBA Lightweight Champion 199 Jul 9 – 1990 Apr 4, WBA Light Welterweight Champion 1991 Jun 14 – 1992 Apr 10.
7	Pedro Montañez	2007	92 wins out of 103 fights. Never held a title.
8	Joe Cortez	2011	The first Puerto Rican boxing referee to be inducted into the Boxing Hall of Fame
9	Herbert "Cocoa Kid" Hardwick	2012	Member of boxing's "Black Murderers' Row". World Colored Welterweight Championship - June 11, 1937 to August 22, 1938; World Colored Middleweight Championship - January 11, 1940 until the title went extinct in the 1940s; World Colored Middleweight Championship - January 15, 1943 until the title went extinct in the 1940s
10	Félix "Tito" Trinidad	2014	Captured the IBF welterweight crown in his 20th pro bout. Won the WBA light middleweight title from David Reid in March 2000 and later that year unified titles with a 12th-round knockout against IBF champ Fernando Vargas. In 2001 became a three-division champion.
11	Héctor "Macho" Camacho	2016	First boxer to be recognized as a septuple champion in history (counting championships from minor sanctioning bodies). WBC Super Featherweight Championship - August 7, 1983 – 1984, WBC Lightweight Championship - August 10, 1985 – 1987, WBO Light Welterweight Champion - March 6, 1989 – February 23, 1991, WBO Light Welterweight Champion - May 18, 1991–1992.
12	Mario Rivera Martino	2019	First Puerto Rican boxing sports writer to be inducted into the International Boxing Hall of Fame. He served Puerto Rican boxing for more than 50 years as a writer and eventual commissioner.
13	Miguel Cotto	2022	He is a multiple-time world champion, and the first Puerto Rican boxer to win world titles in four weight classes, from light welterweight to middleweight. In 2007 and 2009,

= Indicates the person is no longer alive14 ivan Calderon

== See also ==
- List of bantamweight boxing champions
- List of Puerto Rican boxing world champions
- Sports in Puerto Rico
- Undisputed championship (boxing)

Achievements
Preceded by Panama Al Brown; Recognition withdrawn	Montreal Athletic Commission World Bantamweight Champion; June 26, 1934 – August 26, 1935	Succeeded by Lou Salica
Preceded by Panama Al Brown; Recognition withdrawn	NBA World Bantamweight Champion; August 7, 1935 – August 26, 1935	Succeeded by Lou Salica
Preceded by Panama Al Brown; Recognition withdrawn	NYSAC World Bantamweight Champion; August 7, 1935 – August 26, 1935	Succeeded by Lou Salica
Preceded by Tony Marino (boxer)	World Bantamweight Champion; November 15, 1935 – September 23, 1937	Succeeded by Harry Jeffra
Preceded by Harry Jeffra	World Bantamweight Champion; February 20, 1938– October 1939; Vacated	Succeeded by Lou Salica
