= Harry Jeffra =

American boxer (1914–1988)

Personal information
- Nationality: American
- Born: Ignazio Pasquale Giuffre; November 30, 1914 Baltimore, Maryland, U.S.
- Died: September 1988 (aged 73) Baltimore, Maryland, U.S.
- Height: 5 ft 5 in (1.65 m)
- Weight: Bantamweight; Featherweight

Boxing career

Boxing record
- Total fights: 122
- Wins: 94
- Win by KO: 27
- Losses: 20
- Draws: 7
- No contests: 1

Harry Jeffra (born Ignazio Pasquale Giuffre on November 30, 1914 – September 1988) was an American boxer. Born in Baltimore, Maryland, he became an Undisputed World Bantamweight and NYSAC World Featherweight boxing champion. His career spanned from 1933 to 1950, and his final record showed 93 wins with (27 by KOs), 20 losses, and 7 draws. Jeffra was inducted into the World Boxing Hall of Fame in 1998. His manager was Max Waxman, and his trainer was Heinie Blaustein.

== Early life and career ==
Jeffra was born on in Baltimore, Maryland. He claimed to have changed his name from Ignatius Guiffie in the fourth grade, when his school principal said she couldn't pronounce it. According to Jeffra, he began boxing in 1929 at age fifteen, though his amateur career was rather dismal, fighting twenty-eight amateur bouts, and losing twenty seven.

Apparently his boxing fortunes changed for the better once turning professional around eighteen, and particularly after finding manager Max Wacman. Fighting exclusively in his hometown of Baltimore, Maryland as a professional between September 22, 1933, and August 2, 1935, he won twenty-six fights with only one draw and not a single loss.

=== First meeting with Sixto Escobar ===
On December 9, 1936, Jeffra first met the reigning World Bantamweight champion Sixto Escobar. Though barely 23 years old, Jeffra was awarded a 10-round decision at New York's Hippodrome. Both fighters boxed close to the 120 pound mark, slightly over the Bantamweight limit. This was an important early victory for a boxer aspiring to a world championship to beat a world champion, even if it was not in a title fight.

On May 13, 1937, he defeated Nicky Jerome handily at the New York Hippodrome. Two right hand shots in the second round put Jerome on the mat twice, once for a count of seven and the second time, 1:26 into the second round, the referee stopped the fight.

On July 19, 1937, he defeated Ruby Bradley, a well known opponent, at Arena stadium in Philadelphia in a fourth-round technical knockout.

== Capturing the World Bantamweight Championship ==
Jeffra captured the World Bantamweight title at age 23 by outpointing Puerto Rican great Sixto Escobar on September 23, 1937 in a fifteen-round points decision in New York's Polo Grounds. A noteworthy source wrote that "he (Jeffra) deserved the decision by a wide margin, winning nine rounds to Escobar's two." The evening included three championship prizefights in one night staged by promoter Mike Jacobs, and included a bout by boxing great Barney Ross. The crowd numbered an extraordinary 32,600, though even more had been anticipated at Jacob's masterpiece of displayed boxing skill. The bout was Jeffra's first fifteen-round battle, and exhausted after the win, he was jubilant, but expected to take a month off from training.

=== Losing the World Bantamweight Championship ===
Jeffra, however, lost the title to Escobar in his home country in San Juan, Puerto, Rico, on February 20, 1938 in another classic fifteen round points decision before a crowd of around 13,000. Winning by a large margin, and probably inspired by the home crowd, Escobar floored Jeffra twice in the eleventh and once in the fourteenth. After the bout, Jeffra announced through his trainer that he would never again try to make the strict Bantamweight limit. At least one source considered the restrictive dieting and heavy work outs required by Jeffra to make the 118 bantamweight limit, and the resulting lack of stamina, to be one of the causes of his loss to Escobar.

On September 17, 1938, Jeffra defeated Nicky Jerome in a sixth-round technical knockout at Ridgewood Grove in Brooklyn. Jerome was an important opponent.

== Capturing the World Featherweight Championship ==
Jeffra then moved up in weight to featherweight, where he fought several bouts against Joey Archibald. On September 28, 1939, Archibald won a very controversial split decision after 15 rounds against Jeffra. Most writers scored the fight for Jeffra.

On May 20, 1940, Jeffra outpointed Archibald to win the NYSAC (New York) version of the World Featherweight Championship in a fifteen rounds unanimous decision in his hometown of Baltimore. The title was also recognized by Maryland, and possibly California. Jeffra won by a large margin before an impressive crowd of 4,500. He came close to knocking out Archibald in the second where he scored three knockdowns using strong rights, two for counts of nine. Though Archibald attempted comebacks in the eighth and ninth rounds with a strong showing, it was not enough to affect Jeffra's wide margin.

On July 29, 1940, he successfully defended his NYSAC World Featherweight Title against Spider Armstrong in a fifteen-round Unanimous Decision at Carlin's Park in Baltimore.

=== Three bouts with Bill Speary ===
On November 19, 1940, he fought Bill Speary for the first time. He lost in a ten-round somewhat close Unanimous Decision at the Kingston Armory in Kingston, Pennsylvania. Most of the judges gave Speary only six rounds on points in the bout, though it was enough to win, as several of the remaining rounds were scored as draws. The Wilkes-Barre Evening News considered the bout the best of Speary's boxing career.

On January 6, 1941, he defeated Speary in their second meeting in a twelve-round Unanimous Decision at Carlin's Park in Baltimore. In their third meeting on February 2, 1942, he beat Speary in a ten-round Split Decision before a crowd of 7,000 at the Maple Leaf Gardens in Toronto, Canada. There were no knockdowns in the fight, which started slowly in the early rounds. Jeffra used a straight right and a less effective left to build a lead in points primarily in the last three rounds.

=== Loss of the World Featherweight Title ===
He lost to Archibald in a NYSAC title bout on May 12, 1941 in a fifteen-round split decision in Washington, D.C., though according to most sources, it is not entirely clear if he subsequently lost the NYSAC World Featherweight Title. Several articles noticed the split decision merely complicated the status of NYSAC World Featherweight Title. Archibald used the win to push his candidacy for the more widely recognized NBA World Featherweight Title.

On August 12, 1941, he matched Mike Raffa at Forbes Field in Pittsburgh, Pennsylvania in a ten-round draw.

On September 8, 1941, he defeated well known boxer Tommy Forte in a ten-round unanimous decision at Shibe Park, in Philadelphia, Pennsylvania. Forte was considered a World Bantamweight contender and fought former champion Lou Salica on several occasions.

On September 15, 1941, he defeated Lou Transparenti at the Colliseum in Baltimore in a twelve-round unanimous decision. Transparenti had been a contender for the World Featherweight Championship during his career.

On November 10, 1941, Jeffra again defeated great rival Joey Archibald gaining a ten-round Unanimous Decision in Providence, Rhode Island, taking the lead early and never losing it. It was their fourth and last bout together. Jack Dempsey, who shared management with Jeffra, acted as one of his corner men. Jeffra boxed at 128, quite close to the weight of Archibald.

Jeffra lost a NYSAC World Featherweight Title bout to reigning champion Chalky Wright on June 19, 1942, before a crowd of 6,000 at Oriole Park in Baltimore, in a ten-round technical knockout. Jeffra was down in the ninth, badly worn down from the blows of Wright. He returned for the tenth looking weak, and once he was down, the fight was immediately called. Some sources consider this bout as the official loss of his NYSAC Featherweight Title, as the outcome was more decisive than his loss to Archibald in May 1941.

== Important bouts in late boxing career ==
=== Win against champion Lou Salica ===
On March 27, 1944, Jeffra fought an important non-title bout with former NBA World Bantamweight Champion Lou Salica, winning in a ten-round unanimous decision in his hometown of Baltimore. Salica won only one round in the bout that was described as "a cautious, cagey battle between ex-champions that afforded little excitement and no knockdowns." It would be Salica's last known competitive professional bout.

=== Win against champion Phil Terranova ===
On November 20, 1944, Jeffra scratched out an important but close victory in a non-title bout against former NBA World Featherweight Champion Phil Terranova in a ten-round split decision in Baltimore. The crowd of 5,000 probably cheered for Jeffra, their hometown favorite, who rallied in the late rounds to win the close decision.

Jeffra defeated such men as Lou Salica, "Pittsburgh" Jackie Wilson, Ruby Bradley, Joey Iannotti, Indian Quintana, and Bill Speary. Jeffra was inducted into the Ring Boxing Hall of Fame in 1982.

== Titles in boxing ==
=== Major world titles ===
- NYSAC bantamweight champion (118 lbs)
- NBA (WBA) bantamweight champion (118 lbs)
- NYSAC featherweight champion (126 lbs)

=== The Ring magazine titles ===
- The Ring bantamweight champion (118 lbs)

=== Regional/international titles ===
- Maryland featherweight champion (126 lbs)

=== Undisputed titles ===
- Undisputed bantamweight champion

== Life after boxing ==
After retiring from competitive boxing around 1946, but fighting a few bouts as late as 1950, he coached boxing at Western Maryland College for two years and worked as an agent for Jockey Sam Palumbo, an exceptional half mile track rider. In 1960, he joined the staff of Pimlico Race Course in Baltimore, as a stable manager, where he continued to work for many years.

He was married and had two sons and two daughters, sending all to college.

In April 1982, Jeffra was named to the Ring Boxing Hall of Fame.

He died in September 1988.

== See also ==
- List of bantamweight boxing champions
- List of featherweight boxing champions

Achievements
Preceded by Sixto Escobar	World Bantamweight Champion; 23 September 1937– 20 February 1938	Succeeded by Sixto Escobar
Preceded by Joey Archibald	World Featherweight Champion; 20 May 1940– 12 May 1941	Succeeded by Joey Archibald
