= Petey Scalzo =

American boxer (1917–1993)

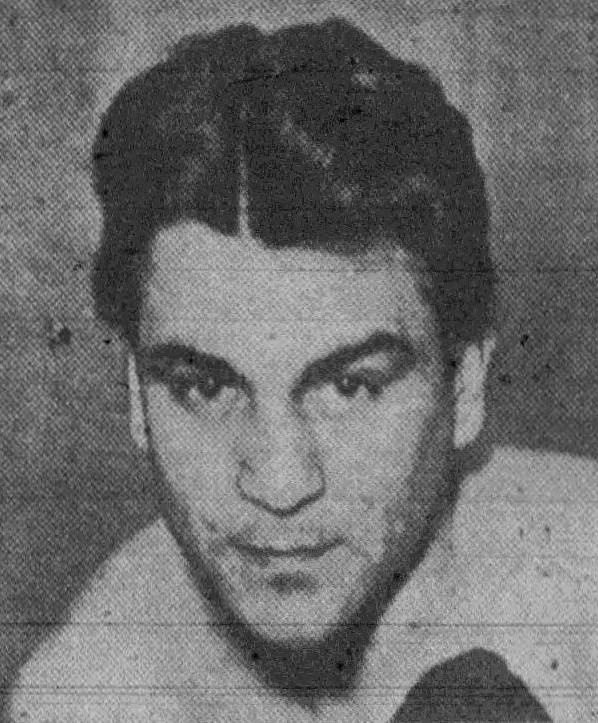
- Scalzo, circa 1942

Personal information
- Nickname: The Greek
- Nationality: American
- Born: Peter Donato Scalzo; August 1, 1917 Brooklyn, New York, U.S.
- Died: June 15, 1993 (aged 75) New York, New York, U.S.
- Height: 5 ft 5 in (1.65 m)
- Weight: Featherweight

Boxing career
- Reach: 5 ft 6.5 in (1.69 m)
- Stance: Orthodox

Boxing record
- Total fights: 112
- Wins: 90
- Win by KO: 48
- Losses: 15
- Draws: 6
- No contests: 1

Petey Scalzo (1917-1993) was an American boxer from Hell's Kitchen, New York. He was declared the National Boxing Association Featherweight Championship of the World on May 1, 1940, two weeks prior to winning a sixth-round technical knockout over Frankie Covelli on May 15, 1940. The NBA had withdrawn the world featherweight championship from Joey Archibald the previous month for his refusal to fight leading contenders, including Scalzo.

Scalzo's manager was the hard working Pete Reilly who found monthly bouts for Scalzo as he began to rise in the boxing ranks. His trainers were Dan and Nick Florio.

== Early life and career ==
Scazo was born in Brooklyn, New York on August 1, 1917, to an Italian family, and survived a rough childhood in Hell’s Kitchen. To earn a living as a youth, he sold newspapers, and danced on street corners for small donations from passing pedestrians. According to one source he spoke Italian, Greek, and sign language as a young man.

Showing remarkable talent in his pursuit of boxing as an amateur, he took the New York Metropolitan AAU championship, and International Golden Gloves bantamweight championship. At the end of his amateur career in 1936, he won the New York Daily News Golden Gloves Open Bantamweight 118 pound Championship before a crowd of 20,000, and soon decided to turn professional.

=== Important win over NYSAC featherweight champion Joey Archibald, 1938 ===
On December 5, 1938, Scalzo defeated the reigning New York State Athletic Commission's (NYSAC) world featherweight champion Joey Archibald in a second-round knockout at Royal Windsor Arena in New York. The bout was not a title fight, and certainly not recognized as one by the National Boxing Association (NBA), a sanctioning body with a wider range and more prestige than the NYSAC. In the first round, Archibald received a hard right to the chin, but managed to rally to keep the round even. After finding an opening in the second round, Scalzo delivered three powerful right hooks to the chin of Archibald that dropped him 2 minutes, and 10 seconds after the bell. The win would cement Scalzo as the leading contender for the National Boxing Association's world featherweight championship.

Demonstrating his punching ability, Scalzo defeated Lou Transparenti at Turners Arena in Washington in a seventh-round technical knockout on January 3, 1939.

On December 1, 1939, Scalzo defeated Allie Stoltz in a fourth-round knockout at New York's Madison Square Garden. It was Stoltz's first loss by knockout. In the fourth, Scalzo knocked Stoltz to the mat for a count of seven with a strong left hook to the chin. Upon arising he was knocked to the mat again with a straight right, after which the referee ended the bout when Stolz could not rise to his feet.

== Taking the NBA world featherweight championship, May 1940 ==
On May 15, 1940, Scalzo defeated Frankie Covelli for the National Boxing Association (NBA) World featherweight title at Washington D.C.'s Griffith Stadium in a decisive sixth-round TKO. Scalzo had previously been declared world featherweight champion by the NBA on May 1, 1940. Scalzo first dropped Covelli to the mat in the fifth with a left hook during close infighting that required Covelli to take a count of nine before he could rise to resume the bout. Upon arising, Scalzo knocked Covelli to the mat again, and after he resumed the bout, Scalzo dropped him for the third and final time. The win was probably Scalzo's single most important victory.

He followed his victory over Covelli with a decisive eight round points decision over Mike Belloise before a roaring crowd of 900 at Starlight Park in the Bronx on June 3, 1940. Belloise briefly held the NYSAC world featherweight title in 1936 before being stripped of it in August, 1937.

=== Notable bouts during world featherweight title reign ===
On July 10, 1940, in one of his few defenses of the world featherweight title, Scalzo defeated Bobby "Poison" Ivy in a fifteen-round TKO in Hartford, Connecticut. Scalzo showed superiority in both long range boxing and infighting, though in the twelfth, Ivy staged a comeback which brought the Connecticut crowd of 5,000 to their feet. Ivy did not return to the ring as the bell sounded for the fifteenth round due to a badly cut and bleeding lip. The United Press scoreboard gave Scalzo eleven rounds, with the second and twelfth for Ivy, and one tied. A few officials present felt Ivy deserved the eleventh round as well.

On July 15, 1940, Scalzo defeated Maxie Fisher before a crowd of around 5600 in a ten-round points decision at Meadowbrook Bowl in Newark, New Jersey. Scalzo was five years younger and had boxed professionally six fewer years. His youthfulness allowed him to step up the contest in the final five rounds. Fisher could not keep pace as Scalzo bored in and delivered a variety of blows, particularly his close range left hook. Nonetheless, there were no knockdowns, and Fisher rallied at times to keep the crowd interested.

On August 26, 1940, Scalzo defeated Jimmy Perrin in a well publicized ten round unanimous decision which brought 10,000 fans to City Park Stadium in New Orleans. Perrin, who fought defensively throughout the bout, was "completely outclassed" by the hard punching Scalzo, and took only the ninth round. Though Scalzo dominated, the fight had no knockdowns and neither boxer left the bout with visible injuries. As both boxers were over the featherweight limit, there was no title at stake.

In an unexpected loss, on October 4, 1940, Jewish boxer Julie Kogon defeated Scalzo in a non-title eight round points decision at Madison Square Garden. Scalzo was down in both the sixth and seventh rounds. Though both fighters fought under 131 pounds, very close to the featherweight range, Kogon was never recognized as a world featherweight championship, as he was a pound or two overweight.

In a non-title bout on November 1, 1940, Scalzo defeated Bernie Friedkin, a Jewish boxer from Brooklyn, at New York's Madison Square Garden in an eight-round points decision, though the New York Times reported the decision was not well received by the fans who were rooting for Friedkin.

On April 18, 1941, he won a first-round technical knockout against Andy Strivani at Legion Stadium in Hollywood, flooring him four times in the first round with rousing rights to the head. After 1:25 of the first around, the referee called the fight.

==== Title match draw with Phil Zwick, May 19, 1941 ====
Scalzo fought Phil Zwick for the National Boxing Association World featherweight title on May 19, 1941, in a Milwaukee, Wisconsin bout that was eventually declared a draw after it was discovered referee Barney Ross had changed his initial scoring from a draw to a Scalzo win. Ross may have been inexperienced as a referee, as his real fame was as a former world light and welterweight champion.

== Losing the NBA world featherweight championship to Richie Lemos, July, 1941 ==
On July 1, 1941 Scalzo lost the NBA world featherweight title before a near capacity crowd of 9,500 to Richie Lemos in a fifth-round knockout of a 12-round bout at the Olympic Auditorium in Los Angeles. Scalzo claimed that he had been somewhat weak during practice the weeks before, having trouble making weight. He was briefly down in the first for a no count from a left by Lemos, who appeared to take the first two rounds. The third and fourth appeared to belong to Scalzo, however, who landed effective uppercuts and crossing rights to Lemos, who rarely countered. In the fifth round, Lemos changed to his natural right hand forward with left foot back or southpaw stance, and in an instant landed a vicious left to the head of Scalzo that changed the course of the bout. Lemos then chased Scalzo to a corner, delivering more punishment. When Scalzo tried to retreat, Lemos tagged him with another scorching left that put his crumpled opponent on the mat for a nine count. According to one source, Lemos had used a feint with his right to throw Scalzo off balance prior to delivering his scorching left. As Scalzo gamely rose and made a futile attempt to resume the fight for the last time, Lemos dropped him for an eight count. Scalzo struggled to rise without success, and the referee called the bout.

== Loss against reigning NYSAC world lightweight champion Bob Montgomery, October 1943 ==
Scalzo's last publicized fight was against reigning NYSAC and Pennsylvania lightweight champion Bob Montgomery on October 25, 1943 at Convention Hall in Philadelphia. No title was at stake as both men were over the lightweight limit, with Montgomery at 137 and Scalzo at 138. Recovering from an impacted tooth, Montgomery was returning from a two-month layoff. Before a crowd of 6,500, Scalzo lost the scheduled ten round bout in the sixth by technical knockout. In the second round, Scalzo received a long cut on his head when Montgomery's head unintentionally bumped against his. Montgomery knocked Scalzo to the mat three times, once in the third and twice in the fifth rounds, and had him drowsy from repeated blows in the sixth. Fifty-three seconds into the sixth the referee stopped the fight, and though Scalzo was on his feet, he seemed helpless against the blows of Montgomery.

== Life after boxing ==
After his boxing career ended, Scalzo refereed boxing matches throughout the 1950s, and worked for the New York State Athletic Commission.

=== Acting career 1963-70 ===
Scalzo gave speaking performances that showcased his unique style of humor, eventually graduating to perform on TV's Ed Sullivan show in a skit he perfected with the great ring announcer Johnnie Addie. Though Scalzo was an ethnic Italian, his comic skits with Addie often presented him as owner of a Greek restaurant and were performed at such venues as Boxing Guild meetings and honorary dinners. He appeared in the 1963 film The Doctor and the Playgirl, filmed in New York with boxing champions Rocky Graziano, Jake LaMotta, and Barney Ross, a childhood idol who refereed his 1941 fight with Phil Zwick. In the 1967 made for TV Movie, World Heavyweight Championship: Muhammed Ali vs. Zora Folley, he had a small role as himself. In 1970 he played "Dinty the Dope" in Starlite Film's poorly reviewed Cauliflower Cupids appearing once again with ex-champions LaMotta and Graziano.

Scalzo died in New York on June 15, 1993, at 73. His wife Christina died a few years earlier. He spent several years in a Veteran's Hospital, suffering from Alzheimers prior to his death.

== Professional boxing record ==
112 fights	90 wins	15 losses
By knockout	48	3
By decision	42	12
Draws	6	
No contests	1	

No.	Result	Record	Opponent	Type	Round, time	Date	Location	Notes
112	Loss	90–15–6 (1)	Bob Montgomery	TKO	6 (10), 0:53	Oct 25, 1943	Convention Hall, Philadelphia, Pennsylvania, US	
111	Win	90–14–6 (1)	Eddie Dowl	PTS	8	Sep 21, 1943	Broadway Arena, New York City, New York, US	
110	Win	89–14–6 (1)	Alex Doyle	TKO	7 (8)	Sep 17, 1943	Fort Hamilton Arena, New York City, New York, US	
109	Loss	88–14–6 (1)	Ellis Phillips	MD	10	Nov 9, 1942	Arena, Philadelphia, Pennsylvania, US	
108	Loss	88–13–6 (1)	Jimmy Collins	UD	10	Oct 5, 1942	Coliseum, Baltimore, Maryland, US	
107	Loss	88–12–6 (1)	Ellis Phillips	UD	10	Sep 21, 1942	Convention Hall, Philadelphia, Pennsylvania, US	
106	Loss	88–11–6 (1)	John Thomas	UD	10	Jun 12, 1942	Legion Stadium, Hollywood, California, US	
105	Loss	88–10–6 (1)	Jimmy Hatcher	UD	10	May 25, 1942	Victory Arena, New Orleans, Louisiana, US	
104	Win	88–9–6 (1)	Toby Vigil	RTD	8 (10)	May 1, 1942	Legion Stadium, Hollywood, California, US	
103	Loss	87–9–6 (1)	Jimmy Hatcher	PTS	8	Apr 7, 1942	Broadway Arena, New York City, New York, US	
102	Loss	87–8–6 (1)	George Latka	UD	10	Mar 20, 1942	Legion Stadium, Hollywood, California, US	
101	Win	87–7–6 (1)	Nat Litfin	PTS	8	Mar 3, 1942	Broadway Arena, New York City, New York, US	
100	NC	85–7–6 (1)	Toby Vigil	NC	6 (10)	Jan 9, 1942	Legion Stadium, Hollywood, California, US	No contest after Vigil could not continue from a low blow
99	Win	86–7–6	Mickey Farber	PTS	8	Dec 30, 1941	Broadway Arena, New York City, New York, US	
98	Loss	85–7–6	Allie Stolz	PTS	8	Dec 19, 1941	Madison Square Garden, New York City, New York, US	
97	Win	85–6–6	Nat Litfin	PTS	8	Nov 4, 1941	Broadway Arena, New York City, New York, US	
96	Win	84–6–6	Curley Nichols	TKO	5 (8)	Oct 21, 1941	Broadway Arena, New York City, New York, US	
95	Win	83–6–6	Mike Raffa	UD	10	Sep 15, 1941	Forbes Field, Pittsburgh, Pennsylvania, US	
94	Win	82–6–6	Jimmy Gilligan	TKO	5 (8)	Sep 9, 1941	Queensboro Arena, New York City, New York, US	
93	Win	81–6–6	Jimmy Gilligan	PTS	8	Aug 21, 1941	Fort Hamilton Arena, New York City, New York, US	
92	Loss	80–6–6	Richie Lemos	KO	5 (12), 2:02	Jul 1, 1941	Olympic Auditorium, Los Angeles, California, US	Lost NBA featherweight title
91	Draw	80–5–6	Phil Zwick	PTS	15	May 19, 1941	Auditorium, Milwaukee, Wisconsin, US	Retained NBA featherweight title
90	Win	80–5–5	Andy Scrivani	TKO	1 (10), 2:05	Apr 18, 1941	Legion Stadium, Hollywood, California, US	
89	Draw	79–5–5	Vern Bybee	PTS	10	Mar 31, 1941	Coliseum Bowl, San Francisco, California, US	
88	Loss	79–5–4	Guy Serean	TKO	8 (10)	Feb 14, 1941	Legion Stadium, Hollywood, California, US	
87	Win	79–4–4	Richie Lemos	TKO	7 (10)	Dec 27, 1940	Legion Stadium, Hollywood, California, US	
86	Win	78–4–4	Bernie Friedkin	PTS	8	Nov 1, 1940	Madison Square Garden, New York City, New York, US	
85	Loss	77–4–4	Julie Kogon	PTS	8	Oct 4, 1940	Madison Square Garden, New York City, New York, US	
84	Win	77–3–4	Jimmy Perrin	UD	10	Aug 26, 1940	City Park Stadium, New Orleans, Louisiana, US	
83	Win	76–3–4	Ginger Foran	PTS	8	Aug 5, 1940	Starlight Park, New York City, New York, US	
82	Win	75–3–4	Maxie Fischer	PTS	10	Jul 15, 1940	Meadowbrook Bowl, Newark, New Jersey, US	
81	Win	74–3–4	Bobby Ivy	TKO	15 (15)	Jul 10, 1940	Bulkeley Stadium, Hartford, Connecticut, US	Retained NBA featherweight title
80	Draw	73–3–4	Bernie Friedkin	PTS	8	Jun 17, 1940	Dexter Park Arena, New York City, New York, US	
79	Win	73–3–3	Mike Belloise	PTS	8	Jun 3, 1940	Starlight Park, New York City, New York, US	
78	Win	72–3–3	Frankie Covelli	TKO	6 (15), 1:05	May 15, 1940	Griffith Stadium, Washington, DC, US	Retained NBA featherweight title
77	Win	71–3–3	Ginger Foran	KO	5 (8), 2:07	Apr 30, 1940	New York Coliseum, New York City, New York, US	
76	Win	70–3–3	Primo Flores	PTS	8	Apr 9, 1940	New York Coliseum, New York City, New York, US	
75	Draw	69–3–3	Primo Flores	PTS	8	Feb 27, 1940	New York Coliseum, New York City, New York, US	
74	Win	69–3–2	Jimmy Vaughn	PTS	8	Feb 17, 1940	Ridgewood Grove, New York City, New York, US	
73	Win	68–3–2	Tony Dupre	KO	2 (8)	Feb 3, 1940	Ridgewood Grove, New York City, New York, US	
72	Win	67–3–2	Cristobal Jaramillo	PTS	8	Jan 29, 1940	St. Nicholas Arena, New York City, New York, US	
71	Win	66–3–2	Nat Litfin	UD	8	Jan 22, 1940	St. Nicholas Arena, New York City, New York, US	
70	Win	65–3–2	'Young' Johnny Buff	KO	2 (8)	Jan 13, 1940	Ridgewood Grove, New York City, New York, US	
69	Win	64–3–2	Simon Chavez	PTS	10	Dec 22, 1939	Madison Square Garden, New York City, New York, US	
68	Win	63–3–2	Hank Nakamura	PTS	8	Dec 12, 1939	New York Coliseum, New York City, New York, US	
67	Win	62–3–2	Allie Stolz	KO	4 (10), 2:13	Dec 1, 1939	Madison Square Garden, New York City, New York, US	
66	Win	61–3–2	Herbie Gilmore	TKO	5 (10)	Nov 8, 1939	Marieville Gardens, North Providence, Rhode Island, US	
65	Loss	60–3–2	Simon Chavez	PTS	10	Oct 15, 1939	Nuevo Circo, Caracas, Venezuela	
64	Win	60–2–2	Frankie Wallace	PTS	8	Jul 28, 1939	Fort Hamilton Arena, New York City, New York, US	
63	Win	59–2–2	Benny Piazza	KO	3 (8)	Jul 14, 1939	Morris County Arena, Mount Freedom, New Jersey, US	
62	Win	58–2–2	Pete DeGrasse	TKO	4 (10), 2:31	Jun 26, 1939	Hickey Park, Millvale, Pennsylvania, US	
61	Win	57–2–2	Emil Joseph	UD	10	Jun 12, 1939	Hickey Park, Millvale, Pennsylvania, US	
60	Win	56–2–2	Vince Dell'Orto	PTS	8	May 3, 1939	Madison Square Garden, New York City, New York, US	
59	Win	55–2–2	Baby Luis	TKO	2 (8), 1:33	Mar 17, 1939	Madison Square Garden, New York City, New York, US	
58	Win	54–2–2	Sal Bartolo	UD	10	Feb 17, 1939	Boston Garden, Boston, Massachusetts, US	
57	Win	53–2–2	Jimmy Buckler	TKO	2 (10), 2:34	Jan 31, 1939	Motor Square Garden, Pittsburgh, Pennsylvania, US	
56	Win	52–2–2	Minnie DeMore	KO	6 (10)	Jan 23, 1939	Motor Square Garden, Pittsburgh, Pennsylvania, US	
55	Win	51–2–2	Lou Transparenti	TKO	7 (10)	Jan 3, 1939	Turner's Arena, Washington, DC, US	
54	Win	50–2–2	Paul 'Tennessee' Lee	PTS	8	Dec 26, 1938	St. Nicholas Arena, New York City, New York, US	
53	Win	49–2–2	Joey Archibald	KO	2 (10), 2:10	Dec 5, 1938	St. Nicholas Arena, New York City, New York, US	
52	Win	48–2–2	Johnny Compo	TKO	5 (8)	Nov 12, 1938	Ridgewood Grove, New York City, New York, US	
51	Win	47–2–2	Jose Santos	TKO	4 (8)	Nov 7, 1938	St. Nicholas Arena, New York City, New York, US	
50	Win	46–2–2	Francis Walsh	KO	2 (8)	Oct 27, 1938	Prospect Hall, New York City, New York, US	
49	Win	45–2–2	Davey Crawford	TKO	3 (8)	Oct 3, 1938	Broadway Arena, New York City, New York, US	
48	Win	44–2–2	Jimmy Lancaster	PTS	8	Sep 16, 1938	Fort Hamilton Arena, New York City, New York, US	
47	Win	43–2–2	Vernon Cormier	PTS	8	Aug 18, 1938	Fort Hamilton Arena, New York City, New York, US	
46	Loss	42–2–2	Tony Dupre	PTS	8	Jul 19, 1938	Griffith Stadium, Washington, DC, US	
45	Win	42–1–2	Al Ragone	PTS	8	Jun 29, 1938	Queensboro Arena, New York City, New York, US	
44	Win	41–1–2	Alex Burns	KO	3 (8)	Jun 23, 1938	Fort Hamilton Arena, New York City, New York, US	
43	Win	40–1–2	George Karkella	PTS	8	May 25, 1938	Queensboro Arena, New York City, New York, US	
42	Win	39–1–2	George Carlo	TKO	5 (8), 2:50	May 20, 1938	Griffith Stadium, Washington, DC, US	
41	Loss	38–1–2	Mike Belloise	PTS	8	Apr 26, 1938	New York Coliseum, New York City, New York, US	
40	Win	38–0–2	Nat Litfin	PTS	8	Mar 15, 1938	New York Coliseum, New York City, New York, US	
39	Win	37–0–2	Cristobal Jaramillo	PTS	6	Mar 4, 1938	Madison Square Garden, New York City, New York, US	
38	Win	36–0–2	Al Gillette	KO	2 (6)	Jan 14, 1938	Rialto Theater, Washington, DC, US	
37	Win	35–0–2	Cristobal Jaramillo	UD	8	Dec 28, 1937	New York Coliseum, New York City, New York, US	
36	Win	34–0–2	Al Reid	PTS	8	Nov 19, 1937	Madison Square Garden, New York City, New York, US	
35	Win	33–0–2	Red Hutchins	TKO	6 (8)	Oct 22, 1937	Hippodrome, New York City, New York, US	
34	Win	32–0–2	Al Gillette	KO	1 (8)	Oct 7, 1937	Fort Hamilton Arena, New York City, New York, US	
33	Win	31–0–2	Harry Gentile	TKO	3 (8)	Sep 30, 1937	Fort Hamilton Arena, New York City, New York, US	
32	Win	30–0–2	San Sanchez	KO	1 (8)	Aug 23, 1937	Arena Stadium, Philadelphia, Pennsylvania, US	
31	Draw	29–0–2	Johnny Pena	PTS	8	Jul 22, 1937	Fort Hamilton Arena, New York City, New York, US	
30	Win	29–0–1	Sammy Russo	KO	1 (6), 1:06	Jul 19, 1937	Dexter Park Arena, New York City, New York, US	
29	Win	28–0–1	Henry Hook	KO	3 (6)	Jul 1, 1937	Fort Hamilton Arena, New York City, New York, US	
28	Win	27–0–1	Al Reid	PTS	8	Jun 15, 1937	New York Coliseum, New York City, New York, US	
27	Win	26–0–1	Harry Gentile	TKO	2 (6)	Jun 7, 1937	Dexter Park Arena, New York City, New York, US	
26	Win	25–0–1	Skippy Allen	KO	2 (6)	May 17, 1937	Dexter Park Arena, New York City, New York, US	
25	Win	24–0–1	Johnny Compo	PTS	6	May 12, 1937	Hippodrome, New York City, New York, US	
24	Win	23–0–1	Joey Wach	PTS	8	May 4, 1937	New York Coliseum, New York City, New York, US	
23	Win	22–0–1	Al Gillette	PTS	6	Apr 6, 1937	New York Coliseum, New York City, New York, US	
22	Win	21–0–1	Cleo Wilson	KO	2 (6)	Apr 1, 1937	Star Casino, New York City, New York, US	
21	Win	20–0–1	Willis Johnson	TKO	5 (6)	Mar 16, 1937	New York Coliseum, New York City, New York, US	
20	Win	19–0–1	Johnny Scibelli	PTS	6	Mar 3, 1937	Hippodrome, New York City, New York, US	
19	Win	18–0–1	Jimmy English	PTS	6	Jan 27, 1937	Hippodrome, New York City, New York, US	
18	Win	17–0–1	Willie Felice	PTS	6	Jan 11, 1937	St. Nicholas Arena, New York City, New York, US	
17	Draw	16–0–1	Al Reid	PTS	8	Dec 29, 1936	New York Coliseum, New York City, New York, US	
16	Win	16–0	Jimmy Lancaster	PTS	6	Dec 9, 1936	Hippodrome, New York City, New York, US	
15	Win	15–0	Georgie Holmes	TKO	1 (6)	Nov 24, 1936	New York Coliseum, New York City, New York, US	
14	Win	14–0	Connie Holmes	TKO	4 (6)	Nov 2, 1936	St. Nicholas Arena, New York City, New York, US	
13	Win	13–0	Johnny Compo	PTS	6	Oct 27, 1936	New York Coliseum, New York City, New York, US	
12	Win	12–0	Abe Schone	KO	2 (6)	Oct 22, 1936	Mecca Sports Arena, New York City, New York, US	
11	Win	11–0	Ramon Pabon	KO	1 (6)	Oct 17, 1936	Ridgewood Grove, New York City, New York, US	
10	Win	10–0	Davey Crawford	KO	2 (6)	Oct 12, 1936	St. Nicholas Arena, New York City, New York, US	
9	Win	9–0	Abe Schone	PTS	4	Oct 5, 1936	St. Nicholas Arena, New York City, New York, US	
8	Win	8–0	Davey Crawford	PTS	4	Sep 29, 1936	New York Coliseum, New York City, New York, US	
7	Win	7–0	Sammy Santillo	PTS	4	Sep 21, 1936	St. Nicholas Arena, New York City, New York, US	
6	Win	6–0	Lou Pisano	KO	1 (4)	Sep 10, 1936	Fort Hamilton Arena, New York City, New York, US	
5	Win	5–0	Benny Johnson	KO	3 (4)	Jul 28, 1936	Queensboro Arena, New York City, New York, US	
4	Win	4–0	Tommy Vello	KO	1 (4)	Jul 21, 1936	Dexter Park Arena, New York City, New York, US	
3	Win	3–0	Andy Crispino	TKO	1 (6)	Jul 9, 1936	Fort Hamilton Arena, New York City, New York, US	
2	Win	2–0	Dominic Pasquale	KO	1 (4)	Jul 7, 1936	Queensboro Arena, New York City, New York, US	
1	Win	1–0	Damasco Seda	TKO	1 (4)	Jun 29, 1936	Dyckman Oval, New York City, New York, US	

== Primary boxing achievements ==
Achievements
Preceded by Joey Archibald	NBA World Featherweight Champion; May 1, 1940 Declared NBA Champion– July 1, 1941	Succeeded by Richie Lemos
