= Joey Archibald =

American boxer (1914–1998)

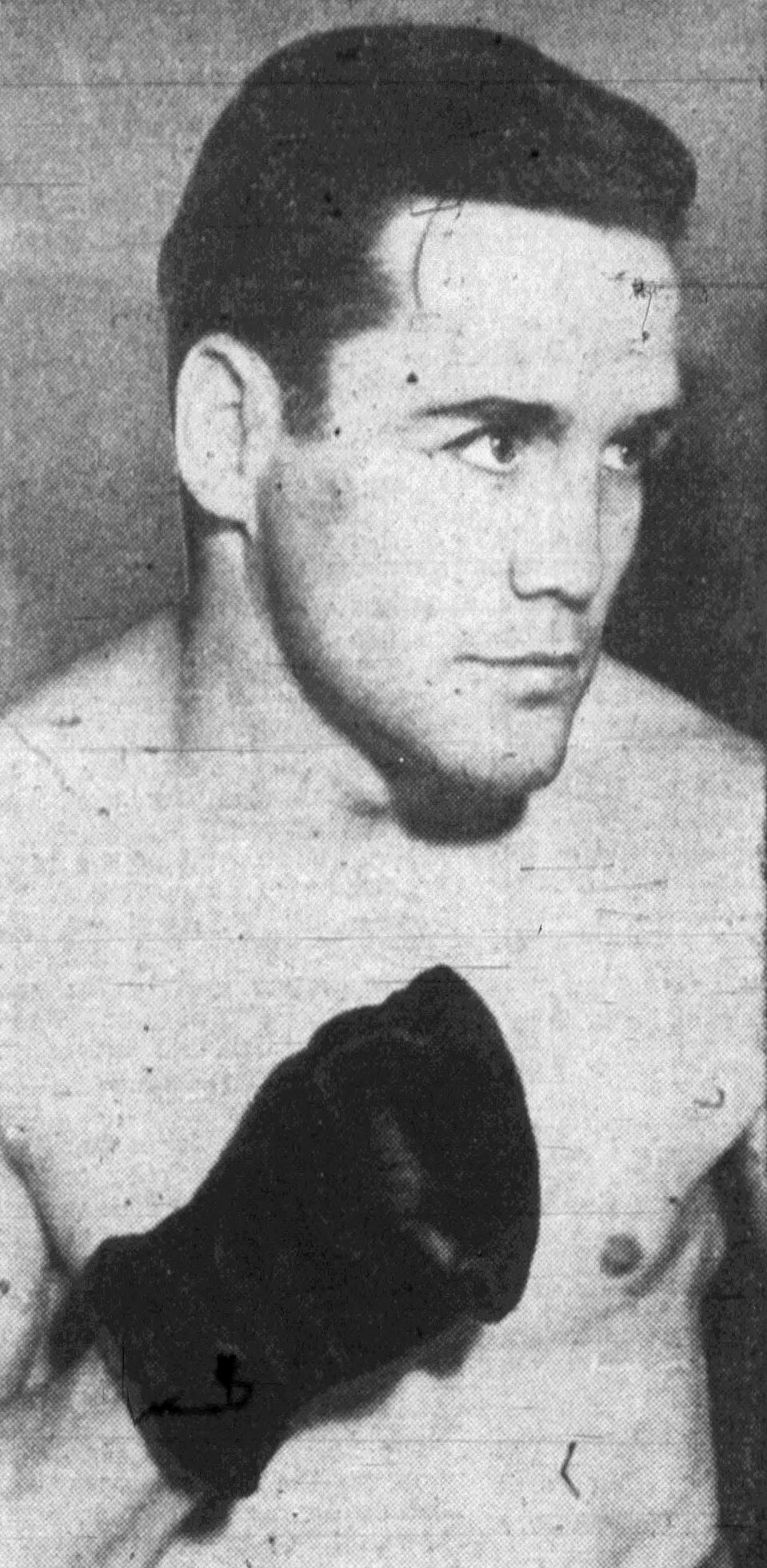
- Archibald, circa 1941

Personal information
- Nationality: American
- Born: Joseph J. Archibald; February 20, 1914 Providence, Rhode Island
- Died: February 3, 1998 (aged 83) Providence, Rhode Island
- Height: 5 ft 2.5 in (1.59 m)
- Weight: Featherweight

Boxing career
- Stance: Orthodox

Boxing record
- Total fights: 107
- Wins: 60
- Win by KO: 29
- Losses: 42
- Draws: 5

Joey Archibald (February 20, 1914 – February 3, 1998) was an Undisputed Featherweight boxing champion in April 1939. He was managed by Al Weill, and his trainer was Charlie Goldman.

== Early life ==
Archibald was born on February 20, 1914, in Providence, Rhode Island. He attended Providence College before his boxing career took off, and once studied for the priesthood.

Setting himself up for a title shot on September 12, 1938, he defeated Tony Dupre, former holder of the 1936 USA New England Bantamweight Title, in a ten-round points decision at Griffith Stadium in Washington D.C.

== NYSAC World Featherweight champion, October, 1938 ==
Archibald won the NYSAC version of the then vacant world featherweight championship when he defeated Mike Belloise, former NYSE featherweight champion, in a fifteen-round points decision at New York's lost boxing shrine, St. Nicholas Arena, on October 17, 1938. He had previously beaten Belloise on July 11, 1938, on points in a close ten-round unanimous decision in Washington, D.C.

Belloise and Archibald were chosen to fight for the title by commissioners of the New York State Athletic Commission, causing some controversy as several top contenders were overlooked. The National Boxing Association had previously decided to give recognition to Archibald if he could subsequently defeat Leo Rodak.

Belloise's boxing and the accuracy of his punching were considered below par for a title match by some reporters. Belloise started strong in the first before a vocal crowd of nearly 7,000, but dropped the second through the fifth rounds to Archibald's continuous blows to his waist and body. In the sixth, Belloise was staggered by Archibald with a succession of hooks that drove him across the ring. In the eleventh through the fifteenth, Archibald came back to gain dominance. Two of the three judges gave the bout to Archibald, with the referee voting a tie, while Ed Hughes of the Brooklyn Daily Eagle gave ten to Archibald, three to Belloise, and two even. In a similar scoring, the United Press gave nine rounds to Archibald, with three to Belloise, and three even.

On December 5, 1938, while still holding the NYSAC featherweight title, Archibald lost to Petey Scalzo in a second-round knockout at Royal Windsor Arena in New York. The bout was not a title fight, and certainly not recognized as one by the National Boxing Association (NBA), a sanctioning body with a wider range and more prestige than the NYSAC. In the first round, Archibald received a hard right to the chin, but managed to rally to keep the round even. After finding an opening in the second round, Scalzo delivered three powerful right hooks to the chin of Archibald that dropped him 2 minutes, and 10 seconds after the bell. The win would cement Scalzo as the leading contender for the National Boxing Association's world featherweight championship, though Archibald's management never scheduled a rematch.

On February 6, 1939, Archibald defeated Al Mancini at Rhode Island Auditorium in Providence in a ten-round non-title points decision.

== NBA World Featherweight Champion, April, 1939 ==
He gained universal recognition and the NBA world featherweight championship when he defeated Leo Rodak before a crowd of 5,500 on April 18, 1939, in a fifteen-round points decision at Rhode Island Auditorium in Providence. Rodak was considered the top contender for the NYSAC world featherweight title. Archibald was the aggressor throughout his bout with Rodak, and landed the most punches in the opinion of the referee who scored for him. The Associated Press gave seven rounds to Archibald, with six for Rodak and two even. Both fighters committed fouls in the eleventh, a round declared even by the referee as was the closely fought seventh. In the thirteenth and fourteenth, with the bout close but Archibald leading by a shade, Rodak broke loose and gained the advantage with long and wary rights. The fifteenth clearly went to Archibald. After the fight, Rodak's manager complained of frequent low blows by Archibald.

=== First NBA Feather title defense, 1939 ===
He defeated Henry Jeffra in his first defense of the featherweight world title in a fifteen-round split decision on September 28, 1939, at Griffith Stadium in Washington, D.C. The referee was the exceptional ex-lightweight champion Benny Leonard who scored ten rounds for Archibald, with only four for Jeffra, though one judged seriously dissented giving ten rounds to Jeffra. The remaining judge gave nine rounds to Archibald. The sports writers who covered the bout unanimously favored Jeffra, as did the crowd of 10,000 who heavily booed and threw newspapers into the ring for five minutes after the split decision was announced.

=== Loss of NBA World Feather title, April, 1940 ===
The NBA withdrew the world featherweight title from Archibald in April 1940 for his refusal to fight leading contenders, particularly Petey Scalzo.

=== Loss of NYSAC World Feather Title, May, 1940 ===
Archibald lost the NYSAC and Baltimore version of the world featherweight title to Harry Jeffra on May 20, 1940, in a fifteen-round Unanimous Decision at the Coliseum in Baltimore. Jeffra was knocked to the canvas three times in the second round, twice for a count of nine. Archibald landed his blows in earnest in the eighth and ninth rounds with lefts to the body, but was far too behind on points to pull ahead. The Associated Press gave Jeffra seven rounds, Archibald three, with five even.

== Retaking the NYSAC World Feather title, May, 1941 ==
Archibald regained the NYSAC version of the world featherweight title from Jeffra on May 12, 1941, in a fifteen-round split decision at Griffith Stadium in Washington before a small crowd of 1,800. With his victory, he also won championship recognition from Maryland, Pennsylvania, and California. Starting as an underdog at odds of 8-5, Archibald came back in the ninth through fourteenth rounds after suffering from a slow start that saw Jeffra leading on points, and then weathered a furious attack from Jeffra in the final round. In a close bout, only referee scored for Jeffra, with both judges backing Archibald.

=== Final loss of NYSAC World Feather title, September 1941 ===
Jeffra's reign was short lived as Chalky Wright knocked him out on September 11, 1941, before a crowd of 5,500 overtook the crown in an eleventh-round knockout at Griffith Stadium in Washington D.C. Wright knocked Archibald to the canvas 54 seconds into the eleventh with a left hook and a powerful straight right, though he was well ahead on points before the knockout. Archibald lost the first eight rounds by a substantial margin.

Before a crowd of 5,500 on June 23, 1942, Archibald lost to the great and undefeated Willie Pep, at Bulkely Stadium, Hartford, Connecticut in an eight-round points decision. There was only one knockdown in the bout when Archibald hit the canvas for a fleeting second in the seventh round. Referee Louis "Kid" Kaplan scored all eight rounds for Pep. Archibald, who still had his speed, was unable to land more than three punches that landed cleanly against the crafty Pep, who retained an exceptional defense throughout the bout which lacked thrills but was clearly an exceptional display between two highly skilled opponents.

Despite his fine effort against Jeffra to regain the title, Archibald appeared to be a fighter in decline after 1939, though he continued to fight high quality opponents. He lost 27 out of 34 fights from July 1939 until his retirement from the ring in August 1943. His final record was 60 wins (29 KOs), 42 losses and 5 draws.

== Professional boxing record ==
107 fights	60 wins	42 losses
By knockout	29	8
By decision	31	33
By disqualification	0	1
Draws	5	

No.	Result	Record	Opponent	Type	Round	Date	Location	Notes
107	Loss	60–42–5	Doll Rafferty	KO	3 (10)	Aug 11, 1943	Borchert Field, Milwaukee, Wisconsin, U.S.	
106	Loss	60–41–5	Tony Costa	MD	10	May 10, 1943	Rhode Island Auditorium, Providence, Rhode Island, U.S.	
105	Loss	60–40–5	Carroll Alexander	SD	8	Apr 9, 1943	Uline Arena, Washington, D.C., U.S.	
104	Loss	60–39–5	Sal Bartolo	UD	10	Mar 26, 1943	Arena, Boston, Massachusetts, U.S.	
103	Loss	60–38–5	Joey Pirrone	UD	8	Jan 7, 1943	Arena, Cleveland, Ohio, U.S.	
102	Loss	60–37–5	Lou Transparenti	UD	10	Nov 2, 1942	Coliseum, Baltimore, Maryland, U.S.	
101	Loss	60–36–5	Willie Pep	UD	10	Oct 16, 1942	Rhode Island Auditorium, Providence, Rhode Island, U.S.	
100	Loss	60–35–5	Adelfo Giz	KO	2 (10)	Sep 5, 1942	Arena Cristal, Havana, Cuba	
99	Loss	60–34–5	Benny Goldberg	PTS	10	Jul 21, 1942	Scott Stadium, Toledo, Ohio, U.S.	
98	Loss	60–33–5	Johnny Forte	PTS	8	Jul 7, 1942	Shibe Park, Philadelphia, Pennsylvania, U.S.	
97	Loss	60–32–5	Willie Pep	PTS	10	Jun 23, 1942	Bulkeley Stadium, Hartford, Connecticut, U.S.	
96	Loss	60–31–5	Mike Raffa	KO	5 (10)	May 25, 1942	Forbes Field, Pittsburgh, Pennsylvania, U.S.	
95	Draw	60–30–5	Aaron Seltzer	PTS	8	Apr 14, 1942	New York Coliseum, New York City, New York, U.S.	
94	Draw	60–30–4	Frankie Rubino	PTS	8	Mar 24, 1942	Broadway Arena, New York City, New York, U.S.	
93	Loss	60–30–3	Lulu Costantino	PTS	8	Feb 9, 1942	St. Nicholas Arena, New York City, New York, U.S.	
92	Loss	60–29–3	Harry Jeffra	UD	10	Nov 10, 1941	Rhode Island Auditorium, Providence, Rhode Island, U.S.	
91	Win	60–28–3	Billy Banks	PTS	10	Oct 14, 1941	Uline Arena, Washington, D.C., U.S.	
90	Loss	59–28–3	Chalky Wright	KO	11 (15)	Sep 11, 1941	Griffith Stadium, Washington, D.C., U.S.	Lost NYSAC and The Ring featherweight titles
89	Loss	59–27–3	Richie Lemos	PTS	10	Aug 26, 1941	Olympic Auditorium, Los Angeles, California, U.S.	
88	Loss	59–26–3	Lou Transparenti	SD	10	Jul 17, 1941	Oriole Park, Baltimore, Maryland, U.S.	
87	Loss	59–25–3	Bobby Ivy	MD	10	Jun 9, 1941	Rhode Island Auditorium, Providence, Rhode Island, U.S.	
86	Win	59–24–3	Harry Jeffra	SD	15	May 12, 1941	Griffith Stadium, Washington, D.C., U.S.	Won NYSAC and The Ring featherweight titles
85	Win	58–24–3	Larry Bolvin	PTS	10	Mar 10, 1941	Rhode Island Auditorium, Providence, Rhode Island, U.S.	
84	Loss	57–24–3	Larry Bolvin	KO	4 (10)	Feb 3, 1941	Rhode Island Auditorium, Providence, Rhode Island, U.S.	
83	Win	57–23–3	Billy Banks	PTS	10	Dec 16, 1940	Turner's Arena, Washington, D.C., U.S.	
82	Loss	56–23–3	Tommy Forte	UD	10	Nov 11, 1940	Arena, Philadelphia, Pennsylvania, U.S.	
81	Loss	56–22–3	Bill Speary	UD	10	Oct 1, 1940	Kingston Armory, Kingston, Pennsylvania, U.S.	
80	Loss	56–21–3	Bobby Ivy	PTS	10	Aug 20, 1940	Bulkeley Stadium, Hartford, Connecticut, U.S.	
79	Loss	56–20–3	Joe Marinelli	MD	10	Aug 2, 1940	Patterson Blvd. Arena, Dayton, Ohio, U.S.	
78	Loss	56–19–3	Harry Jeffra	UD	15	May 20, 1940	Coliseum, Baltimore, Maryland, U.S.	Lost NYSAC and The Ring featherweight titles
77	Loss	56–18–3	Jimmy Perrin	SD	10	Feb 26, 1940	Municipal Auditorium, New Orleans, Louisiana, U.S.	
76	Loss	56–17–3	Al Mancini	PTS	10	Nov 13, 1939	Rhode Island Auditorium, Providence, Rhode Island, U.S.	
75	Win	56–16–3	Harry Jeffra	SD	15	Sep 28, 1939	Griffith Stadium, Washington, D.C., U.S.	Retained NBA, NYSAC, and The Ring featherweight titles
74	Loss	55–16–3	Simon Chavez	PTS	10	Jul 9, 1939	Nuevo Circo, Caracas, Venezuela	
73	Win	55–15–3	Joey Silva	PTS	10	Jun 5, 1939	Griffith Stadium, Washington, D.C., U.S.	
72	Win	54–15–3	Leo Rodak	PTS	15	Apr 18, 1939	Rhode Island Auditorium, Providence, Rhode Island, U.S.	Retained NYSAC featherweight title; Won vacant NBA and The Ring featherweight titles
71	Loss	53–15–3	Jimmy Gilligan	UD	10	Feb 27, 1939	Broadway Auditorium, Buffalo, New York, U.S.	
70	Win	53–14–3	Al Mancini	PTS	10	Feb 6, 1939	Rhode Island Auditorium, Providence, Rhode Island, U.S.	
69	Win	52–14–3	Jerry Mazza	KO	2 (10)	Jan 16, 1939	Turner's Arena, Washington, D.C., U.S.	
68	Loss	51–14–3	Petey Scalzo	KO	2 (10)	Dec 5, 1938	St. Nicholas Arena, New York City, New York, U.S.	
67	Win	51–13–3	Paul Lee	UD	10	Nov 21, 1938	Turner's Arena, Washington, D.C., U.S.	
66	Win	50–13–3	Mike Belloise	MD	15	Oct 17, 1938	St. Nicholas Arena, New York City, New York, U.S.	Won vacant NYSAC featherweight title
65	Win	49–13–3	Tony Dupre	PTS	10	Sep 12, 1938	Griffith Stadium, Washington, D.C., U.S.	
64	Win	48–13–3	Mike Belloise	UD	10	Jul 11, 1938	Griffith Stadium, Washington, D.C., U.S.	
63	Win	47–13–3	Johnny Scibelli	KO	2 (10)	Mar 28, 1938	Turner's Arena, Washington, D.C., U.S.	
62	Win	46–13–3	Sammy Crocetti	PTS	10	Mar 14, 1938	Marieville Gardens, North Providence, Rhode Island, U.S.	
61	Win	45–13–3	Johnny Mirabella	TKO	9 (10)	Mar 7, 1938	Turner's Arena, Washington, D.C., U.S.	
60	Win	44–13–3	Biff Lemieux	UD	10	Dec 10, 1937	Rialto Theater, Washington, D.C., U.S.	
59	Win	43–13–3	Joe Marciente	TKO	4 (8)	Sep 1, 1937	Griffith Stadium, Washington, D.C., U.S.	
58	Win	42–13–3	Lou Gevinson	TKO	8 (10)	Aug 2, 1937	Griffith Stadium, Washington, D.C., U.S.	
57	Win	41–13–3	Harry Gentile	TKO	6 (10)	Jul 21, 1937	Griffith Stadium, Washington, D.C., U.S.	
56	Win	40–13–3	Nicky Jerome	KO	10 (10)	Jun 23, 1937	Griffith Stadium, Washington, D.C., U.S.	
55	Win	39–13–3	Ray Ingram	TKO	7 (10)	Jun 2, 1937	Griffith Stadium, Washington, D.C., U.S.	
54	Win	38–13–3	Lawrence Gunn	KO	6 (8)	May 17, 1937	Turner's Arena, Washington, D.C., U.S.	
53	Win	37–13–3	Buddy Grimes	UD	8	May 3, 1937	Turner's Arena, Washington, D.C., U.S.	
52	Loss	36–13–3	Tony Dupre	DQ	4 (10)	Apr 19, 1937	Infantry Hall, Providence, Rhode Island, U.S.	Archibald was disqualified for illegal use of shoulders and elbows
51	Loss	36–12–3	Aurel Toma	PTS	8	Apr 5, 1937	Madison Square Garden, New York City, New York, U.S.	
50	Win	36–11–3	Cyril Joseph	PTS	6	Feb 10, 1937	Hippodrome, New York City, New York, U.S.	
49	Win	35–11–3	Biff Lemieux	UD	12	Jan 28, 1937	Egleston Square Stadium, Boston, Massachusetts, U.S.	Retained USA New England featherweight title
48	Win	34–11–3	Joe Bottom	KO	2 (6)	Jan 8, 1937	Arena, Syracuse, New York, U.S.	
47	Win	33–11–3	Biff Lemieux	UD	12	Nov 26, 1936	Egleston Square Stadium, Boston, Massachusetts, U.S.	Won vacant USA New England featherweight title
46	Win	32–11–3	Joey Wach	PTS	6	Oct 28, 1936	Hippodrome, New York City, New York, U.S.	
45	Loss	31–11–3	Nat Litfin	PTS	8	Jul 28, 1936	New York Coliseum, New York City, New York, U.S.	
44	Loss	31–10–3	Johnny Cabello	KO	2 (8)	Jun 25, 1936	Orange County Fairgrounds, Middletown, New York, U.S.	
43	Win	31–9–3	Katsumi Morioka	PTS	8	Jun 1, 1936	Woodcliff Park, Poughkeepsie, New York, U.S.	
42	Loss	30–9–3	Lou Camps	PTS	8	Apr 21, 1936	New York Coliseum, New York City, New York, U.S.	
41	Win	30–8–3	Phil Siriani	PTS	6	Mar 24, 1936	New York Coliseum, New York City, New York, U.S.	
40	Win	29–8–3	Johnny Mirabella	PTS	6	Mar 17, 1936	Broadway Arena, New York City, New York, U.S.	
39	Win	28–8–3	Jose Santos	TKO	2 (8)	Feb 4, 1936	Broadway Arena, New York City, New York, U.S.	
38	Win	27–8–3	Indian Quintana	PTS	8	Nov 15, 1935	Madison Square Garden, New York City, New York, U.S.	
37	Loss	26–8–3	Johnny Mauro	PTS	8	Sep 26, 1935	Triboro Stadium, Long Island City, New York City, New York, U.S.	
36	Win	26–7–3	Jose Santos	PTS	8	Sep 10, 1935	Woodcliff Park, Poughkeepsie, New York City, New York, U.S.	
35	Win	25–7–3	Johnny Bang	PTS	6	Aug 6, 1935	New York Coliseum, New York City, New York, U.S.	
34	Win	24–7–3	Jimmy Martin	PTS	8	Jul 30, 1935	Coney Island Velodrome, New York City, New York, U.S.	
33	Loss	23–7–3	Sixto Escobar	TKO	6 (8)	May 28, 1935	Polo Grounds, New York City, New York, U.S.	
32	Win	23–6–3	Joey Brown	KO	2 (6)	May 10, 1935	Madison Square Garden, New York City, New York, U.S.	
31	Draw	22–6–3	Jose Santos	PTS	8	Apr 24, 1935	Providence, Rhode Island, U.S.	
30	Win	22–6–2	Petty Dixon	TKO	4 (8)	Mar 14, 1935	Casino, Fall River, Massachusetts, U.S.	
29	Win	21–6–2	Herb Cormier	KO	5 (8)	Dec 12, 1934	Providence, Rhode Island, U.S.	
28	Win	20–6–2	Frankie McKenna	PTS	8	Nov 30, 1934	Casino, Fall River, Massachusetts, U.S.	
27	Win	19–6–2	Frankie McKenna	PTS	8	Nov 23, 1934	Casino, Fall River, Massachusetts, U.S.	
26	Loss	18–6–2	Frankie Martin	PTS	10	Sep 19, 1934	Forum, Montreal, Quebec, Canada	
25	Draw	18–5–2	Dick Welsh	PTS	8	Sep 17, 1934	Valley Arena, Holyoke, Massachusetts, U.S.	
24	Win	18–5–1	Jimmy Doyle	TKO	2 (8)	Aug 13, 1934	Heywood Arena, West Springfield, Massachusetts, U.S.	
23	Win	17–5–1	Skippy Allen	KO	3 (8)	Jul 23, 1934	Heywood Arena, West Springfield, Massachusetts, U.S.	
22	Loss	16–5–1	Felipe Andrade	PTS	8	Jul 9, 1934	Heywood Arena, West Springfield, Massachusetts, U.S.	
21	Loss	16–4–1	Sixto Escobar	UD	10	May 21, 1934	Valley Arena, Holyoke, Massachusetts, U.S.	
20	Win	16–3–1	Damasco Seda	KO	6 (6)	May 18, 1934	Rhode Island Auditorium, Providence, Rhode Island, U.S.	
19	Win	15–3–1	Freddie Lattanzio	RTD	4 (10)	May 14, 1934	Valley Arena, Holyoke, Massachusetts, U.S.	
18	Win	14–3–1	Johnny Bang	PTS	10	Dec 5, 1933	Rhode Island Auditorium, Providence, Rhode Island, U.S.	
17	Win	13–3–1	Ruby Bradley	KO	7 (10)	Nov 7, 1933	Rhode Island Auditorium, Providence, Rhode Island, U.S.	
16	Win	12–3–1	Jimmy Lorenzo	KO	5 (6)	Oct 24, 1933	Providence, Rhode Island, U.S.	
15	Draw	11–3–1	Johnny Bang	PTS	10	Oct 16, 1933	New Bedford, Massachusetts, U.S.	
14	Win	11–3	Billy Walsh	KO	2 (8)	Oct 10, 1933	Rhode Island Auditorium, Providence, Rhode Island, U.S.	
13	Win	10–3	Francis Walsh	PTS	8	Jun 14, 1933	Providence, Rhode Island, U.S.	
12	Loss	9–3	Frankie Genaro	PTS	10	Apr 5, 1933	Casino, Fall River, Massachusetts, U.S.	
11	Win	9–2	Buster Nadeau	KO	4 (8)	Mar 15, 1933	Casino, Fall River, Massachusetts, U.S.	
10	Win	8–2	Herb Bradley	KO	3 (8)	Mar 8, 1933	Casino, Fall River, Massachusetts, U.S.	
9	Win	7–2	Mike Fortier	KO	2 (6)	Feb 8, 1933	Casino, Fall River, Massachusetts, U.S.	
8	Loss	6–2	Ruby Bradley	PTS	8	Jan 18, 1933	Casino, Fall River, Massachusetts, U.S.	
7	Win	6–1	Herb Bradley	TKO	3 (6)	Jan 16, 1933	Infantry Hall, Providence, Rhode Island, U.S.	
6	Win	5–1	Bobby Mullins	KO	1 (6)	Jan 11, 1933	Casino, Fall River, Massachusetts, U.S.	
5	Win	4–1	Francis Walsh	PTS	10	Oct 27, 1932	Mechanics Hall, Worcester, Massachusetts, U.S.	
4	Loss	3–1	Herb Bradley	PTS	8	Jun 8, 1932	Woonsocket, Rhode Island, U.S.	
3	Win	3–0	Johnny Troncone	KO	3 (6)	May 18, 1932	Casino, Fall River, Massachusetts, U.S.	
2	Win	2–0	Leo Cass	KO	1 (6)	May 6, 1932	Casino, Fall River, Massachusetts, U.S.	
1	Win	1–0	Ernest Hebert	KO	4 (6)	Apr 29, 1932	Casino, Fall River, Massachusetts, U.S.	

== Titles in boxing ==
=== Major world titles ===
- NYSAC featherweight champion (126 lbs) (2×)
- NBA (WBA) featherweight champion (126 lbs)

=== The Ring magazine titles ===
- The Ring featherweight champion (126 lbs) (2×)

=== Regional/International titles ===
- New England featherweight champion (126 lbs)

=== Undisputed titles ===
- Undisputed featherweight champion

== See also ==
- List of featherweight boxing champions

Achievements
Vacant Title last held by Henry Armstrong	NBA World Featherweight Champion; April 18, 1939 – May 20, 1940	Succeeded by Harry Jeffra
Preceded by Harry Jeffra	NYSAC World Featherweight Champion; May 12, 1941 –September 11, 1941	Succeeded by Chalky Wright
