= Enrique Chaffardet =

Venezuelan boxer

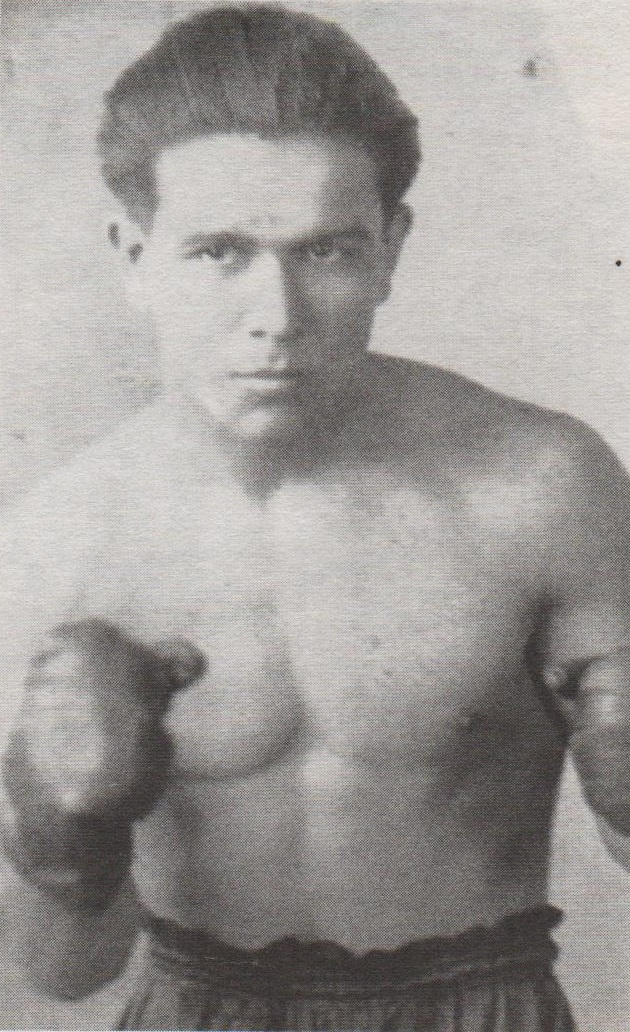
- Enrique Chaffardet 1922 Brooklyn, New York

Personal information
- Nickname: Henry Chaff
- Born: Enrique 'Henry' Chaffardet; December 5, 1907 Güiria, Venezuela
- Died: November 17, 1979 (aged 71) Caracas, Venezuela
- Height: 5 ft 6 in (168 cm)
- Weight: Bantamweight

Boxing career
- Stance: Orthodox

Boxing record
- Wins: 58
- Win by KO: 34
- Losses: 18
- Draws: 7
- No contests: 0

Enrique Chaffardet (December 5, 1907 – April 24, 1980) was a Venezuelan professional boxer during the Roaring Twenties who became the Venezuelan featherweight champion on August 17, 1930, after beating Sixto Escobar. Also known as 'Henry Chaff' and 'El Indio de Irapa' he was the first Venezuelan boxer to ever achieve international success and was eventually inducted into a Boxing Hall of Fame with an official record of 58–20–7. Born in Güiria, Venezuela, he is one of the nation's most legendary athletes. He is also the great-grandfather of Venezuelan footballer Andres De Abreu.

Later on Enrique Chaffardets family fled Venezuela for political reasons and they settled in New York City. In New York he was known as "Henry Chaff." Chaffardet (sometimes spelled "Chafferdet" by the papers) fought as an amateur in New York City around 1924–1925. In 1924 he worked as a sparring partner for Pancho Villa in New York. As an amateur boxer for the Ascension Parish House, he scored three kayo victories in one night. He turned pro around 1925, and was trained by former champion Mike McTigue and Clonie Tait. He was the most sought-after boxer in Brooklyn in 1926. His professional debut was on October 7, 1926, against Ernie Lind in New Jersey.

Chaffardet moved to Puerto Rico, and reportedly appeared on the first legal boxing card there. He then returned to Venezuela and continued training boxers, including future rival Simon Chavez.

Venezuelan sources report Chaffardet had over 100 wins as a pro, with about 18 losses. He ended his career in 1944.

Chaffardet died on April 24, 1980, in Caracas, Venezuela.
