= Richie Lemos =

American boxer

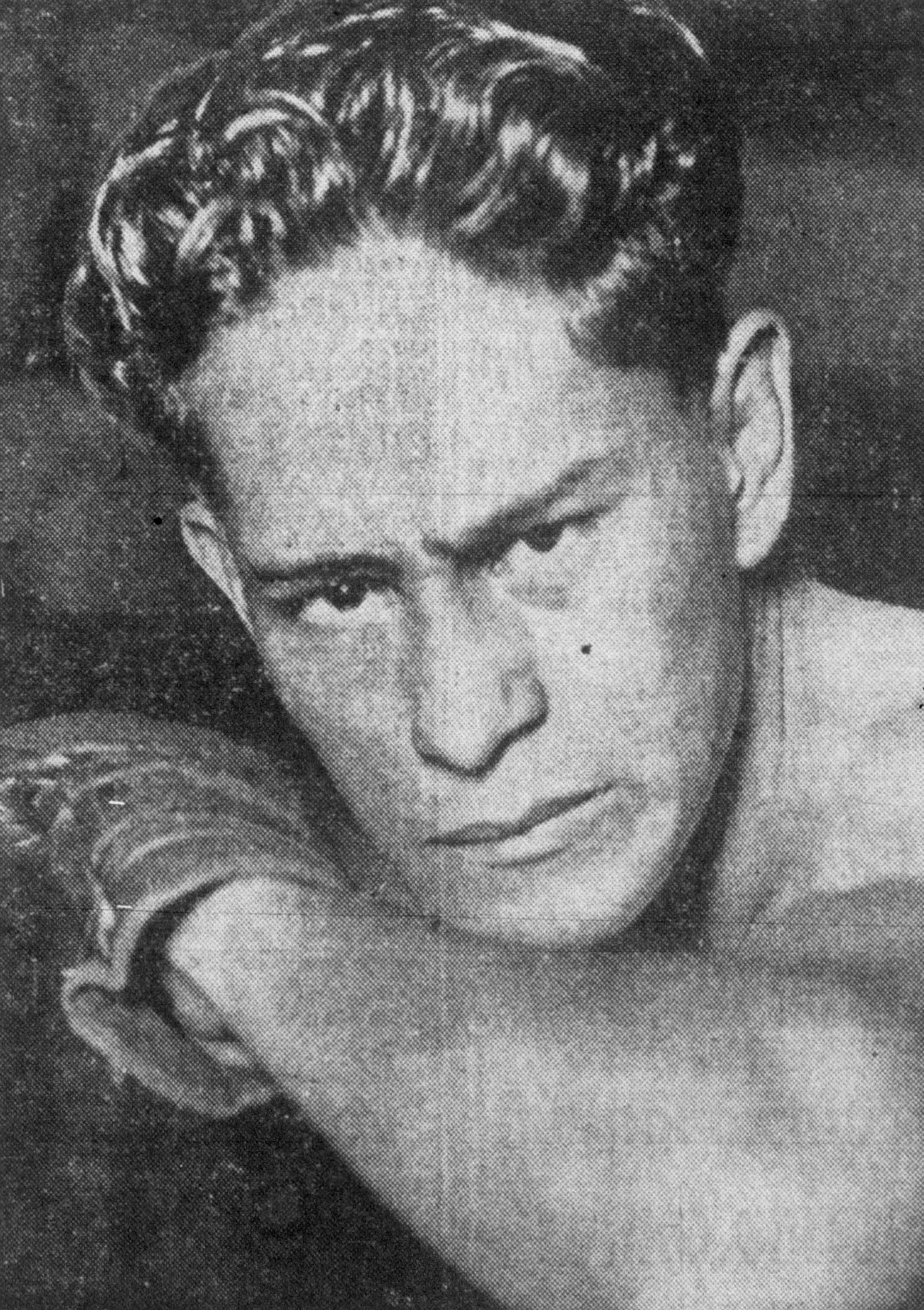
- Lemos, circa 1942

Personal information
- Nickname: Plaza Mexican
- Born: Richard Lemos; February 7, 1920 Los Angeles, California, U.S.
- Died: October 18, 2004 (aged 84) Covina, California, U.S.
- Height: 5 ft 5 in (170 cm)
- Weight: Light Welterweight; Lightweight; Featherweight

Boxing career
- Reach: 72 in (183 cm)
- Stance: Southpaw

Boxing record
- Total fights: 81
- Wins: 55
- Win by KO: 26
- Losses: 23
- Draws: 3

Richie Lemos (Feb 7, 1920 – October 18, 2004) was an American professional boxer in the Featherweight division. He became an NBA World Featherweight Champion in July 1941.

== Early life and career ==
Lemos was born in Los Angeles, near First and Main by the historic Olvera Street, on February 7, 1920. His parents were from Mexico, his mother Michaela from Guadalajara, Jalisco and his father Feliciano from Michoacán. Their struggling family would eventually have nine more children after his birth.

Though American-born, his ring nicknames included "Plaza Mexican" and "Mexican Tiger."

At only eighteen, on July 15, 1938, Lemos defeated prolific Philippine boxer Pablo Dano, holder of the 1935 California World Bantamweight Title, in a ten-round points decision, though he was knocked to the mat twice. The bout took place at Gilmore Stadium in Lemos's hometown of Los Angeles. Five days after the bout, Lemos's manager announced Richie had injured his hand in the bout and would stay away from the ring for five weeks, though the time away stretched to three months.

Lemos's father died three months later in November 1938, making Richie the sole supporter of his mother and nine young sisters and brothers.

With a wife of his own, and a struggling family of siblings to support, Lemos fought often. His better paydays at the peak of his career averaged only $3500, about $81,000 in 2025 dollars, and a modest sum for a world champion boxer today.

On April 6, 1939, Lemos lost to Lou Salica, future holder of both the NYSAC and NBA World Bantamweight Titles, at Legion Stadium in Hollywood in a ten-round points decision.

Lemos came from behind to defeat Eddie Marcus in a searing ten rounder on July 18, 1939, at Olympic Stadium in Los Angeles. The two young boxers exchanged blows furiously in the last three rounds, with Marcus dropping to his knees briefly in the ninth, perhaps from shear exhaustion. Fatigued by the tenth, Lemos summoned a last bit of energy to win by a shade in the final round, though he had been previously knocked to the mat on two earlier occasions.

=== Close first bout with Petey Scalzo, reigning world featherweight champion, December, 1940 ===
On December 27, 1940, Lemos lost to Petey Scalzo, reigning NBA world featherweight champion, in their first meeting, a non-title bout at Legion Stadium in Hollywood. A deep cut over one of his Lemos's eyes caused the ring doctor to stop the fight, which led to his losing the bout in a technical knockout in the seventh round. Significantly, many fans of Lemos in the stands felt he had the better of the bout before receiving his injury. Mushy Callahan, acting referee and famous former boxing lightweight, gave only one round to Scalzo, but five to Lemos, with one even. In a fast bout, Scalzo scored frequently with uppercuts to Lemos's head, though most were blocked effectively.

On April 1, 1941, he defeated Jewish Brooklyn-born boxer Lew Feldman, in a ten-round points decision at Olympic Stadium in Los Angeles. Carrying the fight to his opponent throughout the match, Lemos dropped Feldman to the mat for a nine count in the ninth round. The referee gave Lemos six rounds, with three even and only one to Feldman. Feldman had been an outmatched contender for both the Light and Welterweight titles against Henry Armstrong in 1939, and a 1932 contender for the NYSAC World Jr. Lightweight title.

== Taking the NBA World Featherweight Championship, July, 1941 ==
On July 1, 1941, in his first attempt, Lemos took the NBA world featherweight title before a near capacity crowd of 9,500 from Petey Scalzo in a fifth-round knockout of a 12-round bout at the Olympic Auditorium in Los Angeles. Scalzo claimed that he had been somewhat weak during practice the weeks before, having trouble making weight. Scalzo was briefly down in the first for a no count from a left by Lemos, who appeared to take the first two rounds.

The third and fourth rounds appeared to belong to Scalzo, however, who landed effective uppercuts and crossing rights against Lemos, who rarely countered. In the fifth round, Lemos changed to his natural right hand forward with left foot back or southpaw stance, and in an instant landed a vicious left to the head of Scalzo that changed the course of the bout. Lemos then chased Scalzo to a corner, delivering more punishment. When Scalzo tried to retreat, Lemos tagged him with another scorching left that put his crumpled opponent on the mat for a nine count. According to one source, Lemos had used a feint with his right to throw Scalzo off balance prior to delivering his scorching left. As Scalzo gamely rose and made a futile attempt to resume the fight for the last time, Lemos dropped him for an eight count. Scalzo struggled to rise without success, and the referee called the bout.

On August 26, 1941, Lemos defeated Joey Archibald, former NBA world featherweight champion in a ten-round points decision at Olympic Auditorium in Los Angeles in a lopsided battle where Lemos had Archibald's style completely deciphered by the fourth round. Archibald landed few telling blows, and mostly backpedaled throughout the bout. The referee gave Lemos ten rounds, though the Los Angeles Times gave him six, as they claimed Archibald led in the first three by a shade. In the first four rounds, Archibald staged a duck and weave defense that prevented Lemos from boring in. Lemos, though winning the bout took home only $1,163, a relatively paltry sum today for a world champion in a winning bout, even in 1941 dollars.

Four months after the Scalzo win, Lemos's wife Julia gave birth to their first daughter, Ann Marie on November 11, 1941.

== Losing the NBA World Featherweight Championship against Jackie Wilson, November, 1941 ==
On November 18, 1941, Lemos lost the NBA world featherweight title by a ten-round unanimous decision to Jackie Wilson at Olympic Auditorium in Los Angeles. In an exciting bout, the L.A. Times, gave Wilson nine of the twelve rounds before a full house of 9000 fans. In the sixth, Lemos brought only a temporary halt to Wilson's dominance with a well placed body attack. There were no knockdowns in the bout, with Wilson playing a solid defense, though Lemos staged a rousing but belated comeback in the tenth using solid rights that rocked his opponent on his heels. The fight was Lemos's first and only defense of the featherweight title. Wilson vowed to win the rematch to take place in thirty days.

=== Losing title rematch with Jackie Wilson, December, 1941 ===
In their twelve-round NBA featherweight title rematch on December 17, 1941, Lemos still trailed on points going into the final rounds, and tried gallantly to stage a comeback, but Wilson kept Lemos at bay with a flicking left that proved an adequate defense against the former champion. Even when Lemos went to southpaw stance in the sixth, Wilson answered with blows that stopped his opponent's assault. Lemos took only three rounds, Wilson seven, with two even. Both boxers weighed in at 126.

On February 3, 1942, Lemos had his third straight loss against Chalky Wright, reigning NYSAC world featherweight champion, at Olympic Auditorium in Los Angeles, when his cut left eye led to a technical knockout in the sixth round. Wright had taken the NYSAC world featherweight championship in 1941 against Joey Archibald. Lemos appeared to take only the second and third rounds. His cut was caused by a jolting right from Wright in the fifth round which was likely the hardest punch of the contest, and Wright continued to land blows on the eye in the early part of the sixth. A crowd of 8,500 attended the non-title bout for Naval relief.

=== Contending for the California State Lightweight Title, April, 1942 ===
On March 3, 1942, Lemos knocked out Ray Lunny at Olympic Stadium in Los Angeles in the sixth round. The following month on April 28, Lemos lost to Lunny in an unpopular ten-round decision before a near capacity crowd in San Francisco's Civic Auditorium. Lunny's sharp lefts stunned Lemos in the fourth and tenth rounds. Lemos, however, forced the fighting through most of the bout, and scored heavily in the close in fighting. The fight was a title match for the USA California State Lightweight Title. Lunny appeared to take the bout with an injured right hand which he used sparingly, scoring repeatedly with left crosses. Ringsiders gave Lunny six rounds, Lemos three, with one even.

On June 26, 1942, Lemos defeated Bobby Ivy in an eight-round technical knockout at Legion Stadium in Hollywood. Ivy retired to his corner after the eighth round and did not return.

On July 24, 1942, Lemos lost to 1944 NBA World Lightweight Champion Juan Zurita in a ten-round unanimous decision at Legion Stadium in Hollywood. Zurita had formerly taken the National Feather and Lightweight Titles of Mexico. Lemos scored very few strong blows against his better skilled opponent, who seemed to gain momentum in the later rounds. Paul Lowry of the Los Angeles Times gave Zurita every round. Zurita skillfully evaded the blows of Lemos with cunning, and landed left hooks to the body and rights and lefts to the head of Lemos throughout the bout. There were no knockdowns, but in the seventh round, Zurita caused a serious cut over Lemos's left eye.

On October 5, 1942, Lemos mildly upset Cleo Shans, the betting favorite and number two world lightweight contender, in a ten-round points decision at the Arcadian Arena in Providence, Rhode Island. It was Lemos's third victory over Shans in their four meetings, three of which had occurred on the West Coast. Lemos also won their final meeting on May 7, 1943, a ten-round points decision by both judges at Legion Stadium in Hollywood, achieving victory using a series of lefts and hooks with both hands. Lemos took the first three rounds with jabs and hooks to the head, though Shans took the next four rounds. Lemos switched to a left stance in the eighth and ninth to win on points, though Shans took the tenth.

== Life away from the ring and 1943 boxing retirement ==
After his last fight, a ten-round win over Tyree White on August 27, 1943, Lemos felt an intense pain in his eye, later diagnosed as a detached retina. On the day of his eye surgery to correct the problem, his second daughter, Dorothy was born to his wife Julia. After his wife gave birth to his last daughter, Joanne, Lemos tried to enlist in the Army but was barred due poor vision, a result of his eye surgery. He worked as a truck driver, and a butcher, before becoming a custodian at an elementary school in later life. After his wife Julia died in 1985, he lived with his second daughter Dorothy and her husband.

In 1989 Lemos was inducted into the World Boxing Hall of Fame. He died at 84 on October 18, 2004, in Covina, California, a suburb of Los Angeles, after a long illness. He was survived by three daughters, fifteen grandchildren, eight great-grandchildren, and one great-great-grandchild.

== See also ==
- List of Mexican boxing world champions
- List of world featherweight boxing champions

Achievements
Preceded by Petey Scalzo	World Featherweight Champion; 1 July 1941– 18 November 1941	Succeeded by Jackie Wilson
