= Eladio Valdés =

Cuban boxer

Black Bill
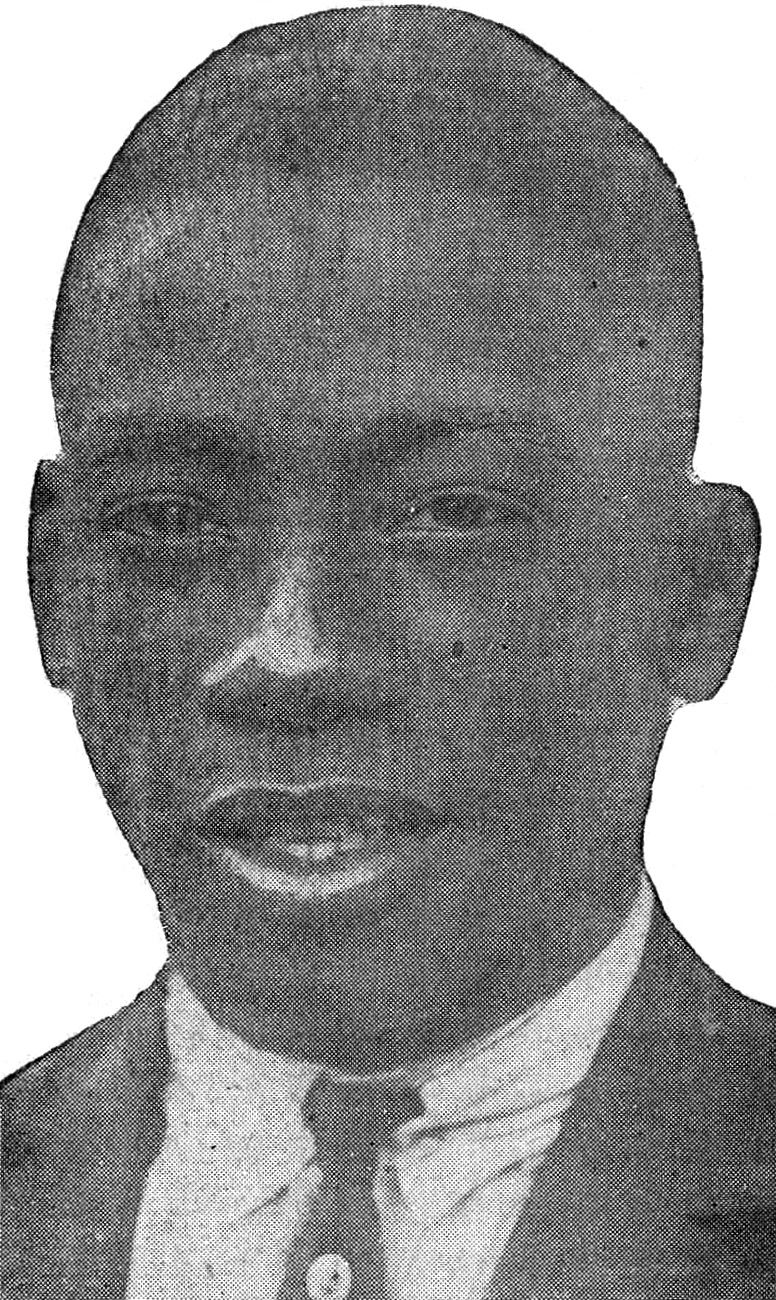

Personal information
- Nickname: Black Bill
- Born: Eladio Valdés; July 1, 1905 Republic of Cuba
- Died: May 13, 1933 (aged 27) Harlem, New York
- Height: 5 ft 3.5 in (1.61 m)
- Weight: Flyweight

Boxing career
- Stance: Orthodox

Boxing record
- Total fights: 168
- Wins: 127
- Win by KO: 20
- Losses: 25
- Draws: 14
- No contests: 2

Eladio "Black Bill" Valdés (July 1905 – May 14, 1933) was a Cuban boxer, active in the 1920s. Small of stature at 5 feet 3.5 inches (1.613 m) and weighing between 109 and 115 pounds (49 and 52 kg), he was managed by Luis "Pincho" Gutiérrez and trained by Moe Fleischer. He made his first official appearance on September 11, 1920 (at age 15) in a fight in Havana, his native city, where he defeated Diego Blanco in the fourth round.

Valdés continued to fight throughout the 1920s, dividing his fights between Havana and New York City. Although he was neither large nor a power hitter, he was known for throwing opponents off guard by attacking with agility and angled punches. He is notable for having never suffered a single loss by knockout. Valdés was the cousin of Cuban boxer Kid Chocolate.

== Boxing career ==

=== Cuban flyweight and light flyweight champion, 1921–1923 ===
On November 6, 1921, he was proclaimed Cuban Flyweight Champion after his defeat of Dixie Lewis, and presented with a belt that month. On May 7, 1923, in Havana, he defeated Genaro Pino for the Light Flyweight Championship of Cuba in 12 rounds.

=== Challenging for the world flyweight championship, 1930 ===
On March 21, 1930, he unsuccessfully challenged Midget Wolgast for the New York State Athletic Commission's version of the World Flyweight Title at Madison Square Garden.

During his career, he defeated opponents such as Johnny McCoy, Willie Davies, "Corporal" Izzy Schwartz, Sammy Bienfield, the French boxer Eugène Huat, Happy Atherton, Genaro Pino, Marty Gold, Bobby Green, Henry Catena, Pinky Silverberg, and Benny Marks.

== Death ==
Plagued by alcoholism and boxing-related blindness, Valdés committed suicide while in Harlem, New York, on May 14, 1933.

== Professional boxing record ==
All information in this section is derived from BoxRec, unless otherwise stated.

=== Official record ===
168 fights	123 wins	24 losses
By knockout	20	0
By decision	100	22
By disqualification	3	2
Draws	13	
No contests	2	
Newspaper decisions/draws	6	

All newspaper decisions are officially regarded as “no decision” bouts and are not counted in the win/loss/draw column.

No.	Result	Record	Opponent	Type	Round	Date	Age	Location	Notes
168	Win	123–24–13 (8)	Felipe Andrade	PTS	10	Jan 1, 1931	25 years, 245 days	Victory Garden Stadium, San Juan, Puerto Rico	
167	Draw	122–24–13 (8)	Jose Lago	PTS	10	Dec 25, 1930	25 years, 238 days	Victory Garden Stadium, San Juan, Puerto Rico	
166	Loss	122–24–12 (8)	Antal Kocsis	PTS	10	Nov 20, 1930	25 years, 203 days	Olympia Boxing Club, New York City, New York, US	
165	Win	122–23–12 (8)	Freddie Lattanzio	PTS	10	Oct 16, 1930	25 years, 168 days	Olympia Boxing Club, New York City, New York, US	
164	Win	121–23–12 (8)	Bobby Zimmerman	PTS	8	Oct 10, 1930	25 years, 162 days	Convention Hall, Camden, New Jersey, US	
163	Loss	120–23–12 (8)	'Happy' Melvin Atherton	NWS	10	Sep 23, 1930	25 years, 145 days	Tomlinson Hall, Indianapolis, Indiana, US	
162	Loss	120–23–12 (7)	Marty Gold	MD	10	Sep 17, 1930	25 years, 139 days	Meyers Bowl, North Braddock, New Jersey, US	
161	Loss	120–22–12 (7)	Willie Davies	UD	10	Jul 14, 1930	25 years, 74 days	Meyers Bowl, North Braddock, New Jersey, US	
160	Loss	120–21–12 (7)	Willie Davies	MD	10	Jun 2, 1930	25 years, 32 days	Meyers Bowl, North Braddock, New Jersey, US	
159	Win	120–20–12 (7)	Routier Parra	SD	6	Apr 28, 1930	24 years, 362 days	Coliseum, Toronto, Ontario, Canada	
158	Loss	119–20–12 (7)	Midget Wolgast	PTS	15	Mar 21, 1930	24 years, 324 days	Madison Square Garden, New York City, New York, US	For vacant NYSAC flyweight title
157	Win	119–19–12 (7)	Manuel González	PTS	10	Mar 1, 1930	24 years, 304 days	Arena Polar, Havana, Cuba	
156	Win	118–19–12 (7)	Routier Parra	PTS	8	Feb 8, 1930	24 years, 283 days	New York Coliseum, New York City, New York, US	
155	Win	117–19–12 (7)	Routier Parra	PTS	8	Jan 25, 1930	24 years, 269 days	New York Coliseum, New York City, New York, US	
154	Win	116–19–12 (7)	Freddie Lattanzio	PTS	10	Jan 11, 1930	24 years, 255 days	New York Coliseum, New York City, New York, US	
153	Win	115–19–12 (7)	Freddie Lattanzio	PTS	10	Dec 11, 1929	24 years, 224 days	New York Coliseum, New York City, New York, US	
152	Win	114–19–12 (7)	Eugène Huat	PTS	10	Nov 22, 1929	24 years, 205 days	Madison Square Garden, New York City, New York, US	
151	Win	113–19–12 (7)	Willie Davies	PTS	10	Nov 4, 1929	24 years, 187 days	Madison Square Garden, New York City, New York, US	
150	Win	112–19–12 (7)	Johnny McCoy	PTS	6	Sep 30, 1929	24 years, 152 days	Broadway Auditorium, Buffalo, New York, US	
149	Win	111–19–12 (7)	'Happy' Melvin Atherton	PTS	10	Sep 17, 1929	24 years, 139 days	Arena Gardens, Toronto, Ontario, Canada	
148	Win	110–19–12 (7)	Tommy Abobo	PTS	10	Aug 31, 1929	24 years, 122 days	Playland Stadium, New York City, New York, US	
147	Win	109–19–12 (7)	Marty Gold	PTS	10	Jul 26, 1929	24 years, 86 days	Playland Stadium, New York City, New York, US	
146	Win	108–19–12 (7)	Phil Tobias	PTS	10	Jul 10, 1929	24 years, 70 days	Ebbets Field, New York City, New York, US	
145	Win	107–19–12 (7)	Harry Goldstein	PTS	10	Jun 24, 1929	24 years, 54 days	Maple Leaf Stadium, Toronto, Ontario, Canada	
144	Win	106–19–12 (7)	Jack McDermott	PTS	10	May 11, 1929	24 years, 10 days	Broadway Arena, New York City, New York, US	
143	Win	105–19–12 (7)	Routier Parra	KO	9 (10)	Apr 29, 1929	23 years, 363 days	Broadway Arena, New York City, New York, US	Also reported by some as an eighth-round KO
142	Win	104–19–12 (7)	Hal Stevenson	TKO	8 (10)	Apr 15, 1929	23 years, 349 days	Broadway Auditorium, Buffalo, New York, US	
141	Win	103–19–12 (7)	Johnny McCoy	PTS	8	Apr 8, 1929	23 years, 342 days	Coliseum, Toronto, Ontario, Canada	
140	Win	102–19–12 (7)	Mickey Paul	PTS	6	Mar 18, 1929	23 years, 321 days	Broadway Auditorium, Buffalo, New York, US	
139	Win	101–19–12 (7)	Marty Gold	PTS	8	Mar 14, 1929	23 years, 317 days	New Broadway AC, Philadelphia, Pennsylvania, US	
138	Win	100–19–12 (7)	Freddie Lattanzio	PTS	10	Feb 23, 1929	23 years, 298 days	Olympia Boxing Club, New York City, New York, US	
137	Win	99–19–12 (7)	Marty Gold	PTS	10	Feb 15, 1929	23 years, 290 days	Hamilton, Ontario, Canada	
136	Win	98–19–12 (7)	Routier Parra	PTS	10	Feb 9, 1929	23 years, 284 days	Olympia Boxing Club, New York City, New York, US	
135	Win	97–19–12 (7)	Tommy Abobo	PTS	10	Jan 26, 1929	23 years, 270 days	Olympia Boxing Club, New York City, New York, US	
134	Win	96–19–12 (7)	Pinky Silverberg	PTS	6	Dec 29, 1928	23 years, 242 days	Olympia Boxing Club, New York City, New York, US	
133	Loss	95–19–12 (7)	Joey Ross	PTS	10	Dec 3, 1928	23 years, 216 days	Coliseum, Toronto, Ontario, Canada	
132	Loss	95–18–12 (7)	Corporal Izzy Schwartz	PTS	10	Nov 20, 1928	N/A	Exact location unknown	Unconfirmed bout Exact date unknown
131	Win	95–17–12 (7)	Young Chappie	PTS	10	Nov 17, 1928	23 years, 200 days	Olympia Boxing Club, New York City, New York, US	
130	ND	94–17–12 (7)	Benny Tell	ND	10	Nov 11, 1928	23 years, 194 days	Exact location unknown	Exact date unknown
129	Win	94–17–12 (6)	Young Granado	PTS	10	Sep 1, 1928	23 years, 123 days	Havana, Cuba	
128	Win	93–17–12 (6)	H. Betancourt	KO	10 (?)	Aug 30, 1928	N/A	Exact location unknown	KO-5? Exact date unknown
127	Win	92–17–12 (6)	John Dempsey	DQ	5 (?)	Aug 18, 1928	N/A	Exact location unknown	Exact date unknown
126	Win	91–17–12 (6)	Corporal Izzy Schwartz	PTS	10	Aug 8, 1928	N/A	Exact location unknown	Exact date unknown
125	Win	90–17–12 (6)	Enrique Valdes	PTS	8	Jun 16, 1928	23 years, 46 days	Arena Colon, Havana, Cuba	
124	Win	89–17–12 (6)	Gilbert Castillo	PTS	10	May 30, 1928	N/A	Havana, Cuba	Exact date unknown
123	Win	88–17–12 (6)	Enrique Valdes	PTS	10	Mar 10, 1928	22 years, 314 days	Arena Colon, Havana, Cuba	
122	Win	87–17–12 (6)	Ramon Perez	PTS	10	Mar 3, 1928	22 years, 307 days	Arena Colon, Havana, Cuba	
121	Win	86–17–12 (6)	Anselmo Kid Salgado	KO	2 (6)	Feb 25, 1928	22 years, 300 days	Arena Colon, Havana, Cuba	
120	Win	85–17–12 (6)	Gilbert Castillo	KO	10 (10)	Nov 15, 1927	N/A	Havana, Cuba	Exact date unknown
119	Win	84–17–12 (6)	Luis Kiki Torres	PTS	10	Sep 10, 1927	22 years, 132 days	Nuevo Fronton, Havana, Cuba	
118	Win	83–17–12 (6)	Harry Goldstein	PTS	10	Aug 2, 1927	22 years, 93 days	Madonna Park, Englewood, New Jersey, US	
117	Win	83–17–12 (5)	Willie Cubic	NWS	10	Jul 20, 1927	22 years, 80 days	Newark, New Jersey, US	
116	Win	83–17–12 (4)	Phil Tobias	PTS	10	Apr 11, 1927	21 years, 345 days	Broadway Arena, New York City, New York, US	
115	Draw	82–17–12 (4)	Matty White	NWS	8	Feb 28, 1927	21 years, 303 days	Waltz Dream Arena, Atlantic City, New Jersey, US	
114	Loss	82–17–12 (3)	Joey Ross	PTS	10	Feb 5, 1927	21 years, 280 days	Walker AC, New York City, New York, US	
113	Win	82–16–12 (3)	Pinky Silverberg	PTS	6	Jan 19, 1927	21 years, 263 days	Walker AC, New York City, New York, US	
112	Draw	81–16–12 (3)	Blas Rodriguez	PTS	12	Jan 8, 1927	21 years, 252 days	Walker AC, New York City, New York, US	
111	Loss	81–16–11 (3)	Davey Adelman	PTS	8	Jan 1, 1927	21 years, 245 days	Armory, Reading, Pennsylvania, US	
110	Loss	81–15–11 (3)	Ruby Bradley	PTS	10	Dec 13, 1926	21 years, 226 days	Valley Arena, Holyoke, Massachusetts, US	
109	Loss	81–14–11 (3)	'Happy' Melvin Atherton	PTS	10	Nov 5, 1926	21 years, 188 days	Pioneer Sporting Club, New York City, New York, US	
108	Win	81–13–11 (3)	Johnny Mayo	NWS	4	Oct 22, 1926	21 years, 174 days	Armory, Hackensack, New Jersey, US	
107	Draw	81–13–11 (2)	Joey Ross	PTS	6	Oct 2, 1926	21 years, 154 days	Walker AC, New York City, New York, US	
106	Loss	81–13–10 (2)	Benny Marks	PTS	6	Sep 11, 1926	21 years, 133 days	Ridgewood Grove, New York City, New York, US	
105	Win	81–12–10 (2)	Benny Marks	DQ	7 (10)	Aug 30, 1926	21 years, 121 days	Dexter Park Arena, New York City, New York, US	Marks was DQ'd for low punching
104	Loss	80–12–10 (2)	Tommy Hughes	PTS	10	Aug 27, 1926	21 years, 118 days	Taylor Bowl, Newburgh Heights, Ohio, US	
103	Draw	80–11–10 (2)	Mickey Gill	PTS	10	Jul 17, 1926	21 years, 77 days	Commonwealth Sporting Club, New York City, New York, US	
102	Draw	80–11–9 (2)	Willie Davies	PTS	12	Jul 5, 1926	21 years, 65 days	Arena Colon, Havana, Cuba	
101	Draw	80–11–8 (2)	Willie Davies	PTS	12	Jun 2, 1926	21 years, 32 days	Havana, Cuba	
100	ND	80–11–7 (2)	Lalo Dominguez	ND	3	Apr 24, 1926	20 years, 358 days	Havana, Cuba	
99	Win	80–11–7 (1)	Enrique Valdes	KO	9 (12)	Apr 14, 1926	20 years, 348 days	Arena Colon, Havana, Cuba	
98	Win	79–11–7 (1)	Henny Catena	PTS	12	Mar 31, 1926	20 years, 334 days	Havana, Cuba	
97	Win	78–11–7 (1)	Johnny Breslin	PTS	10	Mar 15, 1926	20 years, 318 days	Madison Square Garden, New York City, New York, US	
96	Win	77–11–7 (1)	Bobby Green	PTS	10	Mar 6, 1926	20 years, 309 days	Commonwealth Sporting Club, New York City, New York, US	
95	Win	76–11–7 (1)	Eddie Ziegler	PTS	10	Feb 20, 1926	20 years, 295 days	Commonwealth Sporting Club, New York City, New York, US	
94	Win	75–11–7 (1)	Benny Tell	PTS	10	Feb 15, 1926	20 years, 290 days	Broadway Arena, New York City, New York, US	
93	Win	74–11–7 (1)	Manny Wexler	PTS	10	Feb 6, 1926	20 years, 281 days	Commonwealth Sporting Club, New York City, New York, US	
92	Loss	73–11–7 (1)	Young Chappie	PTS	10	Jan 15, 1926	20 years, 259 days	Cambria A.C., Philadelphia, Pennsylvania, US	
91	Win	73–10–7 (1)	Willie Woods	PTS	12	Jan 12, 1926	20 years, 256 days	Albany, New York, US	
90	Win	72–10–7 (1)	Bobby Burke	PTS	10	Jan 2, 1926	20 years, 246 days	Commonwealth Sporting Club, New York City, New York, US	
89	Loss	71–10–7 (1)	Davey Adelman	PTS	6	Jan 1, 1926	N/A	Reading, Pennsylvania, US	Also reported as W-8 for Bill. Exact date & Exact location unknown.
88	Win	71–9–7 (1)	George Waverly	PTS	10	Dec 17, 1925	N/A	Exact location unknown	Exact date unknown
87	Win	70–9–7 (1)	Joe McKean	PTS	10	Dec 12, 1925	20 years, 225 days	Commonwealth Sporting Club, New York City, New York, US	
86	Win	69–9–7 (1)	Marty Gold	PTS	10	Dec 11, 1925	20 years, 224 days	Cambria A.C., Philadelphia, Pennsylvania, US	
85	Win	68–9–7 (1)	Benny Tell	NWS	10	Nov 12, 1925	20 years, 195 days	Commonwealth Sporting Club, New York City, New York, US	
84	Win	68–9–7	Jimmy Russo	PTS	10	Nov 7, 1925	20 years, 190 days	Commonwealth Sporting Club, New York City, New York, US	
83	Win	67–9–7	Corporal Izzy Schwartz	PTS	12	Oct 24, 1925	20 years, 176 days	Commonwealth Sporting Club, New York City, New York, US	
82	Loss	66–9–7	Ernie Jarvis	PTS	10	Oct 16, 1925	20 years, 168 days	Pioneer Sporting Club, New York City, New York, US	
81	Loss	66–8–7	Willie Davies	UD	10	Sep 30, 1925	20 years, 152 days	Arena, Philadelphia, Pennsylvania, US	
80	Win	66–7–7	'Young' Dencio Villamore	PTS	10	Sep 26, 1925	20 years, 148 days	Commonwealth Sporting Club, New York City, New York, US	
79	Loss	65–7–7	Corporal Izzy Schwartz	PTS	10	Sep 17, 1925	20 years, 139 days	Velodrome, New York City, New York, US	
78	Loss	65–6–7	'Young' Dencio Villamore	DQ	5 (12)	Aug 29, 1925	20 years, 120 days	Commonwealth Sporting Club, New York City, New York, US	
77	Win	65–5–7	Battling Al Murray	PTS	10	Aug 22, 1925	20 years, 113 days	Commonwealth Sporting Club, New York City, New York, US	
76	Win	64–5–7	Corporal Izzy Schwartz	PTS	10	Jul 20, 1925	20 years, 80 days	Queensboro Stadium, New York City, New York, US	
75	Win	63–5–7	Willie Woods	PTS	12	Jul 11, 1925	20 years, 71 days	Commonwealth Sporting Club, New York City, New York, US	
74	Win	62–5–7	Corporal Izzy Schwartz	PTS	10	Jun 27, 1925	20 years, 57 days	Commonwealth Sporting Club, New York City, New York, US	
73	Win	61–5–7	Sammy Bienfeld	PTS	10	Jun 13, 1925	20 years, 43 days	Commonwealth Sporting Club, New York City, New York, US	
72	Win	60–5–7	Joe McKean	PTS	10	May 28, 1925	20 years, 27 days	Commonwealth Sporting Club, New York City, New York, US	
71	Win	59–5–7	Jockey Joe Dillon	PTS	10	May 16, 1925	20 years, 15 days	Commonwealth Sporting Club, New York City, New York, US	
70	Win	58–5–7	Willie Woods	PTS	12	May 6, 1925	20 years, 5 days	Manhattan S.C., New York City, New York, US	
69	Win	57–5–7	Tony Takis	PTS	12	Apr 25, 1925	19 years, 359 days	Commonwealth Sporting Club, New York City, New York, US	
68	Win	56–5–7	Bobby Burke	PTS	12	Apr 4, 1925	19 years, 338 days	Commonwealth Sporting Club, New York City, New York, US	
67	Win	55–5–7	Genaro Pino	PTS	10	Jan 3, 1925	19 years, 247 days	Havana, Cuba	
66	Draw	54–5–7	Kid Campbell	PTS	8	Nov 16, 1924	19 years, 199 days	Plaza de Toros Vista Alegre, Panama City, Panama	
65	Draw	54–5–6	Santiago Zorrilla	PTS	8	Nov 9, 1924	19 years, 192 days	Central American Stadium, Colon City, Panama	
64	Win	54–5–5	Kid Campbell	PTS	12	Oct 18, 1924	19 years, 170 days	Plaza de Toros Vista Alegre, Panama City, Panama	
63	Draw	53–5–5	Kid Vaquero	PTS	8	Oct 11, 1924	19 years, 163 days	Santa Ana Pavilion, Panama City, Panama	
62	Win	53–5–4	Marino Diaz	TKO	6 (8)	Sep 20, 1924	19 years, 142 days	Arena Colon, Havana, Cuba	
61	Win	52–5–4	Kid Molinet	PTS	10	Aug 30, 1924	19 years, 121 days	Lawn & Tennis Club, Havana, Cuba	
60	Win	51–5–4	Enriquito Valdez	TKO	6 (8)	Jul 1, 1924	19 years, 61 days	Havana, Cuba	
59	Win	50–5–4	Ramon Perez	KO	1 (?)	Jun 28, 1924	19 years, 58 days	Havana, Cuba	
58	Win	49–5–4	Ramon Perez	KO	4 (?)	May 10, 1924	19 years, 9 days	Havana, Cuba	
57	Win	48–5–4	Angel 'Kid' White	PTS	10	Feb 9, 1924	18 years, 284 days	Havana, Cuba	
56	Win	47–5–4	Kid Molinet	PTS	6	Jan 5, 1924	18 years, 249 days	Havana, Cuba	
55	Win	46–5–4	Genaro Pino	PTS	10	Dec 8, 1923	18 years, 221 days	Havana, Cuba	
54	Win	45–5–4	Jackie Palmer	PTS	10	Oct 28, 1923	18 years, 180 days	Havana, Cuba	
53	Win	44–5–4	Emilio Casado	KO	4 (?)	Sep 1, 1923	18 years, 123 days	Havana, Cuba	
52	Win	43–5–4	Kid Guanajay	PTS	8	Aug 19, 1923	18 years, 110 days	Havana, Cuba	
51	Win	42–5–4	Mike Rojo	PTS	10	Jul 22, 1923	18 years, 82 days	Havana, Cuba	
50	Win	41–5–4	Modesto Morales	PTS	8	Jul 2, 1923	N/A	Exact location unknown	Exact date, manner of win & number of rounds unknown
49	Win	40–5–4	Tommy Albear	PTS	8	Jun 10, 1923	18 years, 40 days	Havana, Cuba	
48	Win	39–5–4	Genaro Pino	PTS	12	May 7, 1923	18 years, 6 days	Havana, Cuba	Won Cuban light flyweight title
47	Win	38–5–4	Kid Guanajay	PTS	6	Mar 17, 1923	17 years, 320 days	Havana, Cuba	
46	Win	37–5–4	Kid Guanajay	PTS	8	Nov 25, 1922	17 years, 208 days	Havana, Cuba	
45	Loss	36–5–4	Genaro Pino	DQ	7 (8)	Oct 10, 1922	17 years, 162 days	Stadium Marina, Havana, Cuba	For vacant Cuban light flyweight title
44	Win	36–4–4	Joe Gomez	PTS	12	Jul 22, 1922	17 years, 52 days	Fronton Jai-Alai, Havana, Cuba	
43	Win	35–4–4	Luis Ventura	PTS	8	Jul 15, 1922	N/A	Havana, Cuba	Exact date not known. 1920-1922.
42	Win	34–4–4	Modesto Morales	PTS	6	Jul 10, 1922	N/A	Exact location unknown	Exact date, location & number of rounds unknown.
41	Win	33–4–4	Kid Delgado	PTS	6	Jun 15, 1922	17 years, 45 days	Havana, Cuba	
40	Win	32–4–4	Modesto Morales	PTS	6	May 20, 1922	17 years, 19 days	Nuevo Fronton, Havana, Cuba	
39	Win	31–4–4	Kid McCarthy	PTS	6	May 15, 1922	N/A	Havana, Cuba	Exact date not known. 1920-1922.
38	Win	30–4–4	Andres Urquia	PTS	6	Apr 29, 1922	N/A	Nuevo Fronton, Havana, Cuba	Exact date not known. 1920-1922.
37	Win	29–4–4	Modesto Morales	PTS	?	Apr 10, 1922	N/A	Havana, Cuba	Exact date, manner of win & number of rounds unknown.
36	Win	28–4–4	Andres Rojo	KO	1 (?)	Apr 8, 1922	N/A	Havana, Cuba	Exact date not known. 1920-1922.
35	Win	27–4–4	Modesto Morales	PTS	6	Mar 10, 1922	N/A	Exact location unknown	Exact date, manner of win & number of rounds unknown.
34	Loss	26–4–4	Antonio Valdez	PTS	8	Jan 28, 1922	16 years, 272 days	Fronton Jai-Alai, Marianao, Cuba	
33	Loss	26–3–4	Jockey Joe Dillon	PTS	12	Jan 14, 1922	16 years, 258 days	Marianao, Cuba	
32	Loss	26–2–4	Antonio Valdez	PTS	6	Jan 11, 1922	16 years, 255 days	Havana, Cuba	
31	Draw	26–1–4	Julio Otamendi	PTS	4	Jan 7, 1922	N/A	Havana, Cuba	Exact date not known. 1920-1922.
30	Win	26–1–3	Diego Pedroso	KO	2 (?)	Dec 10, 1921	N/A	Havana, Cuba	Exact date not known. 1920-1922.
29	Win	25–1–3	Mike Rojo	KO	8 (?)	Nov 25, 1921	16 years, 208 days	Stadium, Havana, Cuba	Retained Cuban flyweight title
28	Win	24–1–3	Young Sibysco	KO	5 (?)	Nov 8, 1921	N/A	Havana, Cuba	Exact date not known. 1920-1921 period.
27	Win	23–1–3	Dixie Lewis	PTS	8	Nov 6, 1921	16 years, 189 days	Havana, Cuba	
26	Win	22–1–3	Joe Fox	KO	5 (6)	Oct 16, 1921	16 years, 168 days	Santos & Artigas, Havana, Cuba	Number of rounds unknown.
25	Win	21–1–3	Modesto Morales	PTS	?	Oct 10, 1921	N/A	Stadium, Havana, Cuba	Exact date, manner of win & number of rounds unknown.
24	Win	20–1–3	Kid Guanajay	PTS	4	Oct 2, 1921	16 years, 154 days	Teatro Apolo, Havana, Cuba	
23	Draw	19–1–3	Julio Otamendi	PTS	8	Sep 25, 1921	16 years, 147 days	Fronton Jai-Alai, Havana, Cuba	
22	Win	19–1–2	Modesto Morales	KO	?	Sep 20, 1921	N/A	Stadium Marina, Havana, Cuba	Exact date, manner of win & number of rounds unknown.
21	Win	18–1–2	Eduardo Cardenas	KO	5 (?)	Sep 17, 1921	16 years, 139 days	Havana, Cuba	
20	Win	17–1–2	Diego Pedroso	PTS	6	Sep 9, 1921	16 years, 131 days	Havana, Cuba	Number of rounds unknown.
19	Loss	16–1–2	Kid Castro	PTS	4	Sep 3, 1921	N/A	Havana, Cuba	Exact date not known. 1920-1921 period.
18	Win	16–0–2	Armando Garay	PTS	6	Sep 3, 1921	N/A	Havana, Cuba	Date unknown
17	Win	15–0–2	Andres Urquia	KO	3 (?)	Aug 28, 1921	16 years, 119 days	Havana, Cuba	
16	Win	14–0–2	Modesto Morales	PTS	4	Aug 11, 1921	N/A	Havana, Cuba	Exact date not known. 1920-1922.
15	Draw	13–0–2	Modesto Morales	PTS	6	Jul 24, 1921	16 years, 84 days	Havana, Cuba	
14	Win	13–0–1	A. Cardona	KO	5 (?)	Jul 15, 1921	N/A	Havana, Cuba	Exact date not known. 1920-1922.
13	Win	12–0–1	Modesto Morales	PTS	?	Jul 10, 1921	N/A	Exact location unknown	Exact date, manner of win & number of rounds unknown.
12	Win	11–0–1	Kid Garcia	KO	1 (?)	Jun 9, 1921	N/A	Havana, Cuba	Exact date not known. 1920-1922.
11	Win	10–0–1	Modesto Morales	PTS	?	Jun 7, 1921	N/A	Exact location unknown	Exact date, manner of win & number of rounds unknown.
10	Draw	9–0–1	Julio Otamendi	PTS	4	May 2, 1921	N/A	Havana, Cuba	Exact date not known. 1920-1922.
9	Win	9–0	Antonio Pinero	PTS	4	Apr 30, 1921	15 years, 364 days	Havana, Cuba	
8	Win	8–0	Antonio Pinero	DQ	6 (?)	Apr 24, 1921	15 years, 358 days	Palisades Park, Havana, Cuba	
7	Win	7–0	Kid Castro	PTS	6	Apr 3, 1921	15 years, 337 days	Palisades Park, Havana, Cuba	
6	Win	6–0	Andre Fitcher	PTS	6	Mar 2, 1921	N/A	Havana, Cuba	Exact date not known. 1920-1922.
5	Win	5–0	Gerardo Rodriguez	PTS	6	Feb 2, 1921	N/A	Havana, Cuba	Exact date not known. 1920-1922.
4	Win	4–0	Young Alvarez	PTS	4	Jan 2, 1921	15 years, 246 days	Havana, Cuba	
3	Win	3–0	Kid Castro	PTS	6	Dec 11, 1920	N/A	Havana, Cuba	Exact date not known. 1920-1922.
2	Win	2–0	Diego Blanco	PTS	4	Sep 11, 1920	N/A	Havana, Cuba	Exact date not known. 1920-1922.
1	Win	1–0	Enriquito Valdez	PTS	4	Jan 1, 1920	N/A	Exact location unknown	Professional debut Exact date & year, manner of win & number of rounds unknown.

=== Unofficial record ===
168 fights	127 wins	25 losses
By knockout	20	0
By decision	104	23
By disqualification	3	2
Draws	14	
No contests	2	

Record with the inclusion of newspaper decisions in the win/loss/draw column.

No.	Result	Record	Opponent	Type	Round	Date	Age	Location	Notes
168	Win	127–25–14 (2)	Felipe Andrade	PTS	10	Jan 1, 1931	25 years, 245 days	Victory Garden Stadium, San Juan, Puerto Rico	
167	Draw	126–25–14 (2)	Jose Lago	PTS	10	Dec 25, 1930	25 years, 238 days	Victory Garden Stadium, San Juan, Puerto Rico	
166	Loss	126–25–13 (2)	Antal Kocsis	PTS	10	Nov 20, 1930	25 years, 203 days	Olympia Boxing Club, New York City, New York, US	
165	Win	126–24–13 (2)	Freddie Lattanzio	PTS	10	Oct 16, 1930	25 years, 168 days	Olympia Boxing Club, New York City, New York, US	
164	Win	125–24–13 (2)	Bobby Zimmerman	PTS	8	Oct 10, 1930	25 years, 162 days	Convention Hall, Camden, New Jersey, US	
163	Loss	124–24–13 (2)	'Happy' Melvin Atherton	NWS	10	Sep 23, 1930	25 years, 145 days	Tomlinson Hall, Indianapolis, Indiana, US	
162	Loss	123–23–13 (2)	Marty Gold	MD	10	Sep 17, 1930	25 years, 139 days	Meyers Bowl, North Braddock, New Jersey, US	
161	Loss	123–22–13 (2)	Willie Davies	UD	10	Jul 14, 1930	25 years, 74 days	Meyers Bowl, North Braddock, New Jersey, US	
160	Loss	123–21–13 (2)	Willie Davies	MD	10	Jun 2, 1930	25 years, 32 days	Meyers Bowl, North Braddock, New Jersey, US	
159	Win	123–20–13 (2)	Routier Parra	SD	6	Apr 28, 1930	24 years, 362 days	Coliseum, Toronto, Ontario, Canada	
158	Loss	122–20–13 (2)	Midget Wolgast	PTS	15	Mar 21, 1930	24 years, 324 days	Madison Square Garden, New York City, New York, US	For vacant NYSAC flyweight title
157	Win	122–19–13 (2)	Manuel González	PTS	10	Mar 1, 1930	24 years, 304 days	Arena Polar, Havana, Cuba	
156	Win	121–19–13 (2)	Routier Parra	PTS	8	Feb 8, 1930	24 years, 283 days	New York Coliseum, New York City, New York, US	
155	Win	120–19–13 (2)	Routier Parra	PTS	8	Jan 25, 1930	24 years, 269 days	New York Coliseum, New York City, New York, US	
154	Win	119–19–13 (2)	Freddie Lattanzio	PTS	10	Jan 11, 1930	24 years, 255 days	New York Coliseum, New York City, New York, US	
153	Win	118–19–13 (2)	Freddie Lattanzio	PTS	10	Dec 11, 1929	24 years, 224 days	New York Coliseum, New York City, New York, US	
152	Win	117–19–13 (2)	Eugène Huat	PTS	10	Nov 22, 1929	24 years, 205 days	Madison Square Garden, New York City, New York, US	
151	Win	116–19–13 (2)	Willie Davies	PTS	10	Nov 4, 1929	24 years, 187 days	Madison Square Garden, New York City, New York, US	
150	Win	115–19–13 (2)	Johnny McCoy	PTS	6	Sep 30, 1929	24 years, 152 days	Broadway Auditorium, Buffalo, New York, US	
149	Win	114–19–13 (2)	'Happy' Melvin Atherton	PTS	10	Sep 17, 1929	24 years, 139 days	Arena Gardens, Toronto, Ontario, Canada	
148	Win	113–19–13 (2)	Tommy Abobo	PTS	10	Aug 31, 1929	24 years, 122 days	Playland Stadium, New York City, New York, US	
147	Win	112–19–13 (2)	Marty Gold	PTS	10	Jul 26, 1929	24 years, 86 days	Playland Stadium, New York City, New York, US	
146	Win	111–19–13 (2)	Phil Tobias	PTS	10	Jul 10, 1929	24 years, 70 days	Ebbets Field, New York City, New York, US	
145	Win	110–19–13 (2)	Harry Goldstein	PTS	10	Jun 24, 1929	24 years, 54 days	Maple Leaf Stadium, Toronto, Ontario, Canada	
144	Win	109–19–13 (2)	Jack McDermott	PTS	10	May 11, 1929	24 years, 10 days	Broadway Arena, New York City, New York, US	
143	Win	108–19–13 (2)	Routier Parra	KO	9 (10)	Apr 29, 1929	23 years, 363 days	Broadway Arena, New York City, New York, US	Also reported by some as an 8-round KO
142	Win	107–19–13 (2)	Hal Stevenson	TKO	8 (10)	Apr 15, 1929	23 years, 349 days	Broadway Auditorium, Buffalo, New York, US	
141	Win	106–19–13 (2)	Johnny McCoy	PTS	8	Apr 8, 1929	23 years, 342 days	Coliseum, Toronto, Ontario, Canada	
140	Win	105–19–13 (2)	Mickey Paul	PTS	6	Mar 18, 1929	23 years, 321 days	Broadway Auditorium, Buffalo, New York, US	
139	Win	104–19–13 (2)	Marty Gold	PTS	8	Mar 14, 1929	23 years, 317 days	New Broadway AC, Philadelphia, Pennsylvania, US	
138	Win	103–19–13 (2)	Freddie Lattanzio	PTS	10	Feb 23, 1929	23 years, 298 days	Olympia Boxing Club, New York City, New York, US	
137	Win	102–19–13 (2)	Marty Gold	PTS	10	Feb 15, 1929	23 years, 290 days	Hamilton, Ontario, Canada	
136	Win	101–19–13 (2)	Routier Parra	PTS	10	Feb 9, 1929	23 years, 284 days	Olympia Boxing Club, New York City, New York, US	
135	Win	100–19–13 (2)	Tommy Abobo	PTS	10	Jan 26, 1929	23 years, 270 days	Olympia Boxing Club, New York City, New York, US	
134	Win	96–19–12 (2)	Pinky Silverberg	PTS	6	Dec 29, 1928	23 years, 242 days	Olympia Boxing Club, New York City, New York, US	
133	Loss	99–19–13 (2)	Joey Ross	PTS	10	Dec 3, 1928	23 years, 216 days	Coliseum, Toronto, Ontario, Canada	
132	Loss	99–18–13 (2)	Corporal Izzy Schwartz	PTS	10	Nov 20, 1928	N/A	Exact location unknown	Unconfirmed bout Exact date unknown
131	Win	99–17–13 (2)	Young Chappie	PTS	10	Nov 17, 1928	23 years, 200 days	Olympia Boxing Club, New York City, New York, US	
130	ND	98–17–13 (2)	Benny Tell	ND	10	Nov 11, 1928	23 years, 194 days	Exact location unknown	Exact date unknown
129	Win	98–17–13 (1)	Young Granado	PTS	10	Sep 1, 1928	23 years, 123 days	Havana, Cuba	
128	Win	97–17–13 (1)	H. Betancourt	KO	10 (?)	Aug 30, 1928	N/A	Exact location unknown	KO-5? Exact date unknown
127	Win	96–17–13 (1)	John Dempsey	DQ	5 (?)	Aug 18, 1928	N/A	Exact location unknown	Exact date unknown
126	Win	95–17–13 (1)	Corporal Izzy Schwartz	PTS	10	Aug 8, 1928	N/A	Exact location unknown	Exact date unknown
125	Win	94–17–13 (1)	Enrique Valdes	PTS	8	Jun 16, 1928	23 years, 46 days	Arena Colon, Havana, Cuba	
124	Win	93–17–13 (1)	Gilbert Castillo	PTS	10	May 30, 1928	N/A	Havana, Cuba	Exact date unknown
123	Win	92–17–13 (1)	Enrique Valdes	PTS	10	Mar 10, 1928	22 years, 314 days	Arena Colon, Havana, Cuba	
122	Win	91–17–13 (1)	Ramon Perez	PTS	10	Mar 3, 1928	22 years, 307 days	Arena Colon, Havana, Cuba	
121	Win	90–17–13 (1)	Anselmo Kid Salgado	KO	2 (6)	Feb 25, 1928	22 years, 300 days	Arena Colon, Havana, Cuba	
120	Win	89–17–13 (1)	Gilbert Castillo	KO	10 (10)	Nov 15, 1927	N/A	Havana, Cuba	Exact date unknown
119	Win	88–17–13 (1)	Luis Kiki Torres	PTS	10	Sep 10, 1927	22 years, 132 days	Nuevo Fronton, Havana, Cuba	
118	Win	87–17–13 (1)	Harry Goldstein	PTS	10	Aug 2, 1927	22 years, 93 days	Madonna Park, Englewood, New Jersey, US	
117	Win	86–17–13 (1)	Willie Cubic	NWS	10	Jul 20, 1927	22 years, 80 days	Newark, New Jersey, US	
116	Win	85–17–13 (1)	Phil Tobias	PTS	10	Apr 11, 1927	21 years, 345 days	Broadway Arena, New York City, New York, US	
115	Draw	84–17–13 (1)	Matty White	NWS	8	Feb 28, 1927	21 years, 303 days	Waltz Dream Arena, Atlantic City, New Jersey, US	
114	Loss	84–17–12 (1)	Joey Ross	PTS	10	Feb 5, 1927	21 years, 280 days	Walker AC, New York City, New York, US	
113	Win	84–16–12 (1)	Pinky Silverberg	PTS	6	Jan 19, 1927	21 years, 263 days	Walker AC, New York City, New York, US	
112	Draw	83–16–12 (1)	Blas Rodriguez	PTS	12	Jan 8, 1927	21 years, 252 days	Walker AC, New York City, New York, US	
111	Loss	83–16–11 (1)	Davey Adelman	PTS	8	Jan 1, 1927	21 years, 245 days	Armory, Reading, Pennsylvania, US	
110	Loss	83–15–11 (1)	Ruby Bradley	PTS	10	Dec 13, 1926	21 years, 226 days	Valley Arena, Holyoke, Massachusetts, US	
109	Loss	83–14–11 (1)	'Happy' Melvin Atherton	PTS	10	Nov 5, 1926	21 years, 188 days	Pioneer Sporting Club, New York City, New York, US	
108	Win	83–13–11 (1)	Johnny Mayo	NWS	4	Oct 22, 1926	21 years, 174 days	Armory, Hackensack, New Jersey, US	
107	Draw	82–13–11 (1)	Joey Ross	PTS	6	Oct 2, 1926	21 years, 154 days	Walker AC, New York City, New York, US	
106	Loss	82–13–10 (1)	Benny Marks	PTS	6	Sep 11, 1926	21 years, 133 days	Ridgewood Grove, New York City, New York, US	
105	Win	82–12–10 (1)	Benny Marks	DQ	7 (10)	Aug 30, 1926	21 years, 121 days	Dexter Park Arena, New York City, New York, US	Marks was DQ'd for low punching
104	Loss	81–12–10 (1)	Tommy Hughes	PTS	10	Aug 27, 1926	21 years, 118 days	Taylor Bowl, Newburgh Heights, Ohio, US	
103	Draw	81–11–10 (1)	Mickey Gill	PTS	10	Jul 17, 1926	21 years, 77 days	Commonwealth Sporting Club, New York City, New York, US	
102	Draw	81–11–9 (1)	Willie Davies	PTS	12	Jul 5, 1926	21 years, 65 days	Arena Colon, Havana, Cuba	
101	Draw	81–11–8 (1)	Willie Davies	PTS	12	Jun 2, 1926	21 years, 32 days	Havana, Cuba	
100	ND	81–11–7 (1)	Lalo Dominguez	ND	3	Apr 24, 1926	20 years, 358 days	Havana, Cuba	
99	Win	81–11–7	Enrique Valdes	KO	9 (12)	Apr 14, 1926	20 years, 348 days	Arena Colon, Havana, Cuba	
98	Win	80–11–7	Henny Catena	PTS	12	Mar 31, 1926	20 years, 334 days	Havana, Cuba	
97	Win	79–11–7	Johnny Breslin	PTS	10	Mar 15, 1926	20 years, 318 days	Madison Square Garden, New York City, New York, US	
96	Win	78–11–7	Bobby Green	PTS	10	Mar 6, 1926	20 years, 309 days	Commonwealth Sporting Club, New York City, New York, US	
95	Win	77–11–7	Eddie Ziegler	PTS	10	Feb 20, 1926	20 years, 295 days	Commonwealth Sporting Club, New York City, New York, US	
94	Win	76–11–7	Benny Tell	PTS	10	Feb 15, 1926	20 years, 290 days	Broadway Arena, New York City, New York, US	
93	Win	75–11–7	Manny Wexler	PTS	10	Feb 6, 1926	20 years, 281 days	Commonwealth Sporting Club, New York City, New York, US	
92	Loss	74–11–7	Young Chappie	PTS	10	Jan 15, 1926	20 years, 259 days	Cambria A.C., Philadelphia, Pennsylvania, US	
91	Win	74–10–7	Willie Woods	PTS	12	Jan 12, 1926	20 years, 256 days	Albany, New York, US	
90	Win	73–9–7	Bobby Burke	PTS	10	Jan 2, 1926	20 years, 246 days	Commonwealth Sporting Club, New York City, New York, US	
89	Loss	71–10–7	Davey Adelman	PTS	6	Jan 1, 1926	N/A	Reading, Pennsylvania, US	Also reported as W-8 for Bill. Exact date & Exact location unknown.
88	Win	72–9–7	George Waverly	PTS	10	Dec 17, 1925	N/A	Exact location unknown	Exact date unknown
87	Win	71–9–7	Joe McKean	PTS	10	Dec 12, 1925	20 years, 225 days	Commonwealth Sporting Club, New York City, New York, US	
86	Win	70–9–7	Marty Gold	PTS	10	Dec 11, 1925	20 years, 224 days	Cambria A.C., Philadelphia, Pennsylvania, US	
85	Win	69–9–7	Benny Tell	NWS	10	Nov 12, 1925	20 years, 195 days	Commonwealth Sporting Club, New York City, New York, US	
84	Win	68–9–7	Jimmy Russo	PTS	10	Nov 7, 1925	20 years, 190 days	Commonwealth Sporting Club, New York City, New York, US	
83	Win	67–9–7	Corporal Izzy Schwartz	PTS	12	Oct 24, 1925	20 years, 176 days	Commonwealth Sporting Club, New York City, New York, US	
82	Loss	66–9–7	Ernie Jarvis	PTS	10	Oct 16, 1925	20 years, 168 days	Pioneer Sporting Club, New York City, New York, US	
81	Loss	66–8–7	Willie Davies	UD	10	Sep 30, 1925	20 years, 152 days	Arena, Philadelphia, Pennsylvania, US	
80	Win	66–7–7	'Young' Dencio Villamore	PTS	10	Sep 26, 1925	20 years, 148 days	Commonwealth Sporting Club, New York City, New York, US	
79	Loss	65–7–7	Corporal Izzy Schwartz	PTS	10	Sep 17, 1925	20 years, 139 days	Velodrome, New York City, New York, US	
78	Loss	65–6–7	'Young' Dencio Villamore	DQ	5 (12)	Aug 29, 1925	20 years, 120 days	Commonwealth Sporting Club, New York City, New York, US	
77	Win	65–5–7	Battling Al Murray	PTS	10	Aug 22, 1925	20 years, 113 days	Commonwealth Sporting Club, New York City, New York, US	
76	Win	64–5–7	Corporal Izzy Schwartz	PTS	10	Jul 20, 1925	20 years, 80 days	Queensboro Stadium, New York City, New York, US	
75	Win	63–5–7	Willie Woods	PTS	12	Jul 11, 1925	20 years, 71 days	Commonwealth Sporting Club, New York City, New York, US	
74	Win	62–5–7	Corporal Izzy Schwartz	PTS	10	Jun 27, 1925	20 years, 57 days	Commonwealth Sporting Club, New York City, New York, US	
73	Win	61–5–7	Sammy Bienfeld	PTS	10	Jun 13, 1925	20 years, 43 days	Commonwealth Sporting Club, New York City, New York, US	
72	Win	60–5–7	Joe McKean	PTS	10	May 28, 1925	20 years, 27 days	Commonwealth Sporting Club, New York City, New York, US	
71	Win	59–5–7	Jockey Joe Dillon	PTS	10	May 16, 1925	20 years, 15 days	Commonwealth Sporting Club, New York City, New York, US	
70	Win	58–5–7	Willie Woods	PTS	12	May 6, 1925	20 years, 5 days	Manhattan S.C., New York City, New York, US	
69	Win	57–5–7	Tony Takis	PTS	12	Apr 25, 1925	19 years, 359 days	Commonwealth Sporting Club, New York City, New York, US	
68	Win	56–5–7	Bobby Burke	PTS	12	Apr 4, 1925	19 years, 338 days	Commonwealth Sporting Club, New York City, New York, US	
67	Win	55–5–7	Genaro Pino	PTS	10	Jan 3, 1925	19 years, 247 days	Havana, Cuba	
66	Draw	54–5–7	Kid Campbell	PTS	8	Nov 16, 1924	19 years, 199 days	Plaza de Toros Vista Alegre, Panama City, Panama	
65	Draw	54–5–6	Santiago Zorrilla	PTS	8	Nov 9, 1924	19 years, 192 days	Central American Stadium, Colon City, Panama	
64	Win	54–5–5	Kid Campbell	PTS	12	Oct 18, 1924	19 years, 170 days	Plaza de Toros Vista Alegre, Panama City, Panama	
63	Draw	53–5–5	Kid Vaquero	PTS	8	Oct 11, 1924	19 years, 163 days	Santa Ana Pavilion, Panama City, Panama	
62	Win	53–5–4	Marino Diaz	TKO	6 (8)	Sep 20, 1924	19 years, 142 days	Arena Colon, Havana, Cuba	
61	Win	52–5–4	Kid Molinet	PTS	10	Aug 30, 1924	19 years, 121 days	Lawn & Tennis Club, Havana, Cuba	
60	Win	51–5–4	Enriquito Valdez	TKO	6 (8)	Jul 1, 1924	19 years, 61 days	Havana, Cuba	
59	Win	50–5–4	Ramon Perez	KO	1 (?)	Jun 28, 1924	19 years, 58 days	Havana, Cuba	
58	Win	49–5–4	Ramon Perez	KO	4 (?)	May 10, 1924	19 years, 9 days	Havana, Cuba	
57	Win	48–5–4	Angel 'Kid' White	PTS	10	Feb 9, 1924	18 years, 284 days	Havana, Cuba	
56	Win	47–5–4	Kid Molinet	PTS	6	Jan 5, 1924	18 years, 249 days	Havana, Cuba	
55	Win	46–5–4	Genaro Pino	PTS	10	Dec 8, 1923	18 years, 221 days	Havana, Cuba	
54	Win	45–5–4	Jackie Palmer	PTS	10	Oct 28, 1923	18 years, 180 days	Havana, Cuba	
53	Win	44–5–4	Emilio Casado	KO	4 (?)	Sep 1, 1923	18 years, 123 days	Havana, Cuba	
52	Win	43–5–4	Kid Guanajay	PTS	8	Aug 19, 1923	18 years, 110 days	Havana, Cuba	
51	Win	42–5–4	Mike Rojo	PTS	10	Jul 22, 1923	18 years, 82 days	Havana, Cuba	
50	Win	41–5–4	Modesto Morales	PTS	8	Jul 2, 1923	N/A	Exact location unknown	Exact date, manner of win & number of rounds unknown
49	Win	40–5–4	Tommy Albear	PTS	8	Jun 10, 1923	18 years, 40 days	Havana, Cuba	
48	Win	39–5–4	Genaro Pino	PTS	12	May 7, 1923	18 years, 6 days	Havana, Cuba	Won Cuban light flyweight title
47	Win	38–5–4	Kid Guanajay	PTS	6	Mar 17, 1923	17 years, 320 days	Havana, Cuba	
46	Win	37–5–4	Kid Guanajay	PTS	8	Nov 25, 1922	17 years, 208 days	Havana, Cuba	
45	Loss	36–5–4	Genaro Pino	DQ	7 (8)	Oct 10, 1922	17 years, 162 days	Stadium Marina, Havana, Cuba	For vacant Cuban light flyweight title
44	Win	36–4–4	Joe Gomez	PTS	12	Jul 22, 1922	17 years, 52 days	Fronton Jai-Alai, Havana, Cuba	
43	Win	35–4–4	Luis Ventura	PTS	8	Jul 15, 1922	N/A	Havana, Cuba	Exact date not known. 1920-1922.
42	Win	34–4–4	Modesto Morales	PTS	6	Jul 10, 1922	N/A	Exact location unknown	Exact date, location & number of rounds unknown.
41	Win	33–4–4	Kid Delgado	PTS	6	Jun 15, 1922	17 years, 45 days	Havana, Cuba	
40	Win	32–4–4	Modesto Morales	PTS	6	May 20, 1922	17 years, 19 days	Nuevo Fronton, Havana, Cuba	
39	Win	31–4–4	Kid McCarthy	PTS	6	May 15, 1922	N/A	Havana, Cuba	Exact date not known. 1920-1922.
38	Win	30–4–4	Andres Urquia	PTS	6	Apr 29, 1922	N/A	Nuevo Fronton, Havana, Cuba	Exact date not known. 1920-1922.
37	Win	29–4–4	Modesto Morales	PTS	?	Apr 10, 1922	N/A	Havana, Cuba	Exact date, manner of win & number of rounds unknown.
36	Win	28–4–4	Andres Rojo	KO	1 (?)	Apr 8, 1922	N/A	Havana, Cuba	Exact date not known. 1920-1922.
35	Win	27–4–4	Modesto Morales	PTS	6	Mar 10, 1922	N/A	Exact location unknown	Exact date, manner of win & number of rounds unknown.
34	Loss	26–4–4	Antonio Valdez	PTS	8	Jan 28, 1922	16 years, 272 days	Fronton Jai-Alai, Marianao, Cuba	
33	Loss	26–3–4	Jockey Joe Dillon	PTS	12	Jan 14, 1922	16 years, 258 days	Marianao, Cuba	
32	Loss	26–2–4	Antonio Valdez	PTS	6	Jan 11, 1922	16 years, 255 days	Havana, Cuba	
31	Draw	26–1–4	Julio Otamendi	PTS	4	Jan 7, 1922	N/A	Havana, Cuba	Exact date not known. 1920-1922.
30	Win	26–1–3	Diego Pedroso	KO	2 (?)	Dec 10, 1921	N/A	Havana, Cuba	Exact date not known. 1920-1922.
29	Win	25–1–3	Mike Rojo	KO	8 (?)	Nov 25, 1921	16 years, 208 days	Stadium, Havana, Cuba	Retained Cuban flyweight title
28	Win	24–1–3	Young Sibysco	KO	5 (?)	Nov 8, 1921	N/A	Havana, Cuba	Exact date not known. 1920-1921 period.
27	Win	23–1–3	Dixie Lewis	PTS	8	Nov 6, 1921	16 years, 189 days	Havana, Cuba	
26	Win	22–1–3	Joe Fox	KO	5 (6)	Oct 16, 1921	16 years, 168 days	Santos & Artigas, Havana, Cuba	Number of rounds unknown.
25	Win	21–1–3	Modesto Morales	PTS	?	Oct 10, 1921	N/A	Stadium, Havana, Cuba	Exact date, manner of win & number of rounds unknown.
24	Win	20–1–3	Kid Guanajay	PTS	4	Oct 2, 1921	16 years, 154 days	Teatro Apolo, Havana, Cuba	
23	Draw	19–1–3	Julio Otamendi	PTS	8	Sep 25, 1921	16 years, 147 days	Fronton Jai-Alai, Havana, Cuba	
22	Win	19–1–2	Modesto Morales	KO	?	Sep 20, 1921	N/A	Stadium Marina, Havana, Cuba	Exact date, manner of win & number of rounds unknown.
21	Win	18–1–2	Eduardo Cardenas	KO	5 (?)	Sep 17, 1921	16 years, 139 days	Havana, Cuba	
20	Win	17–1–2	Diego Pedroso	PTS	6	Sep 9, 1921	16 years, 131 days	Havana, Cuba	Number of rounds unknown.
19	Loss	16–1–2	Kid Castro	PTS	4	Sep 3, 1921	N/A	Havana, Cuba	Exact date not known. 1920-1921 period.
18	Win	16–0–2	Armando Garay	PTS	6	Sep 3, 1921	N/A	Havana, Cuba	Date unknown
17	Win	15–0–2	Andres Urquia	KO	3 (?)	Aug 28, 1921	16 years, 119 days	Havana, Cuba	
16	Win	14–0–2	Modesto Morales	PTS	4	Aug 11, 1921	N/A	Havana, Cuba	Exact date not known. 1920-1922.
15	Draw	13–0–2	Modesto Morales	PTS	6	Jul 24, 1921	16 years, 84 days	Havana, Cuba	
14	Win	13–0–1	A. Cardona	KO	5 (?)	Jul 15, 1921	N/A	Havana, Cuba	Exact date not known. 1920-1922.
13	Win	12–0–1	Modesto Morales	PTS	?	Jul 10, 1921	N/A	Exact location unknown	Exact date, manner of win & number of rounds unknown.
12	Win	11–0–1	Kid Garcia	KO	1 (?)	Jun 9, 1921	N/A	Havana, Cuba	Exact date not known. 1920-1922.
11	Win	10–0–1	Modesto Morales	PTS	?	Jun 7, 1921	N/A	Exact location unknown	Exact date, manner of win & number of rounds unknown.
10	Draw	9–0–1	Julio Otamendi	PTS	4	May 2, 1921	N/A	Havana, Cuba	Exact date not known. 1920-1922.
9	Win	9–0	Antonio Pinero	PTS	4	Apr 30, 1921	15 years, 364 days	Havana, Cuba	
8	Win	8–0	Antonio Pinero	DQ	6 (?)	Apr 24, 1921	15 years, 358 days	Palisades Park, Havana, Cuba	
7	Win	7–0	Kid Castro	PTS	6	Apr 3, 1921	15 years, 337 days	Palisades Park, Havana, Cuba	
6	Win	6–0	Andre Fitcher	PTS	6	Mar 2, 1921	N/A	Havana, Cuba	Exact date not known. 1920-1922.
5	Win	5–0	Gerardo Rodriguez	PTS	6	Feb 2, 1921	N/A	Havana, Cuba	Exact date not known. 1920-1922.
4	Win	4–0	Young Alvarez	PTS	4	Jan 2, 1921	15 years, 246 days	Havana, Cuba	
3	Win	3–0	Kid Castro	PTS	6	Dec 11, 1920	N/A	Havana, Cuba	Exact date not known. 1920-1922.
2	Win	2–0	Diego Blanco	PTS	4	Sep 11, 1920	N/A	Havana, Cuba	Exact date not known. 1920-1922.
1	Win	1–0	Enriquito Valdez	PTS	4	Jan 1, 1920	N/A	Exact location unknown	Professional debut Exact date & year, manner of win & number of rounds unknown.
