= Newsboy Brown =

American boxer (1905–1977)

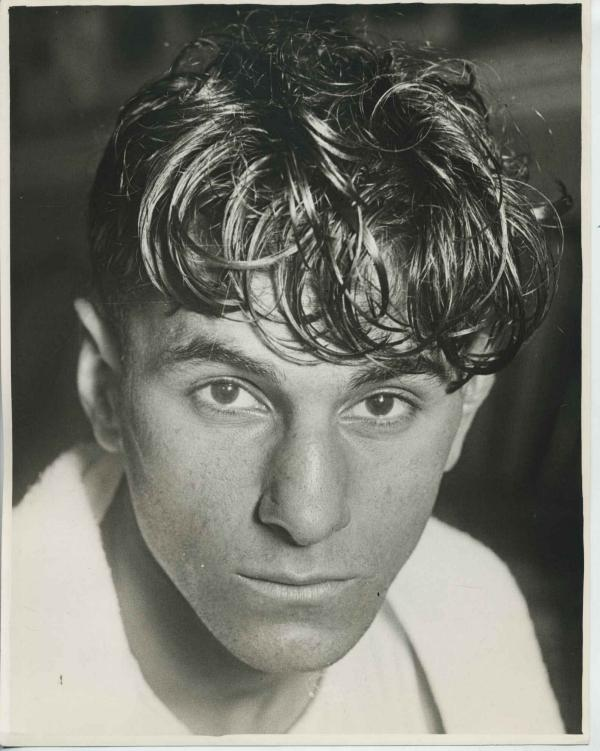
- Newsboy Brown circa 1930

Personal information
- Nationality: American
- Born: David Montrose; August 17, 1905 Russian Empire
- Died: February 18, 1977 (aged 71) Los Angeles, California, US
- Height: 5 ft 1 in (1.55 m)
- Weight: Flyweight

Boxing career
- Stance: Orthodox

Boxing record
- Total fights: 91
- Wins: 68
- Win by KO: 12
- Losses: 13
- Draws: 10

David Montrose (August 17, 1905 – February 18, 1977), better known as Newsboy Brown, was an American boxer who held the World Flyweight Title for eight months in 1928.

Statistical boxing website BoxRec lists Brown as the #7 ranked flyweight of all-time. He was inducted into the International Boxing Hall of Fame in 2012. Brown was ranked the second-best bantamweight boxer in the world in The Ring magazine's Annual Ratings for 1931, and the fourth-best in January 1932 by the National Boxing Association.

== Early life and career ==
Born in Russia on August 17, 1905, Brown emigrated to the U.S. with his parents at the age of three months, though the exact date of his birth remains in some dispute. Raised in Sioux City, Iowa, he learned to fight while selling newspapers on street corners like many young immigrant boxers. According to Brown, he weighed only 95 pounds when he first got into boxing. He began boxing professionally around 1922, and early in his career used the name David Montrose. In one of his early fights, he acquired the name "Newsboy Brown" when a ring announcer introduced him without being certain of his name. His first eight fights ended in no decisions, but then Brown registered his first official win with a third-round knockout of John Walker in April 1924.

== Professional career highlights ==
=== NYSAC World Fly title attempt ===
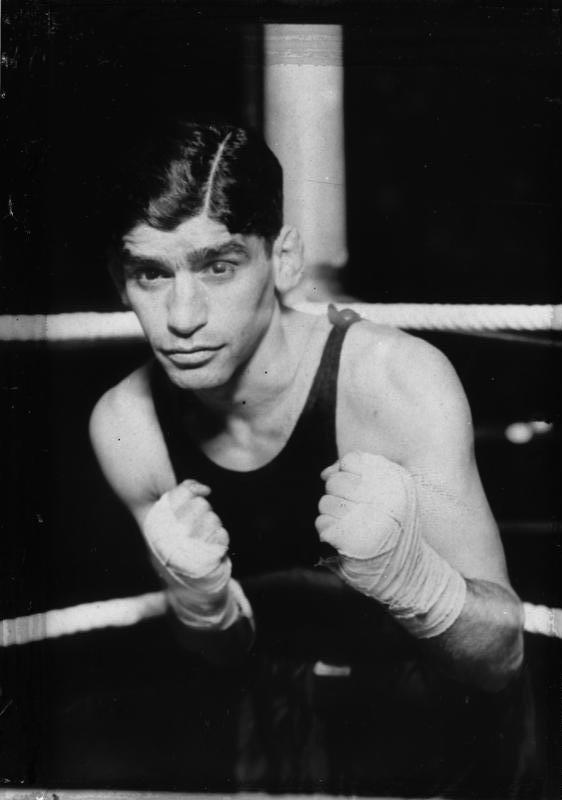
NYSAC Flyweight Champion 1927–29, Izzy Schwartz

In August 1925, as part of the inaugural card for the famous Olympic Auditorium, he defeated Frankie Grandetta by points in six rounds. Brown had two famous bouts against future World Flyweight Champion Corporal Izzy Schwartz. Brown beat him in 1925 but lost in a title bout to Schwartz for the NYSAC flyweight title on December 16, 1927. One newspaper summarizing the bout wrote, "Corporal Izzy Schwartz...outscored Newsboy Brown of Sioux City, Iowa throughout to win recognition in New York as the holder of the Flyweight Championship vacated recently by Fidel LaBarba." Apparently Schwartz demonstrated superior scientific boxing skills and was better trained for the bout, likely because he was five years older than Brown who had not yet reached the peak of his boxing skills at twenty-two. The Norwalk Hour, perhaps showing some local bias, wrote of the well attended bout in Madison Square Garden, that Schwartz was "too fast, shifty, and resourceful, for the plodding Brown, and won hands down." A more objective source noted that Brown had previously defeated Schwartz, and that he "entered as a slight favorite and forced the fighting throughout", despite losing in a unanimous decision. Although it was a NYSAC World Title match, the bout was not the headliner for the night but merely a semi-final. This was probably due to the greater popularity of other weight classes and the dispute over who held the World Flyweight Title at the time. Schwartz would receive his fair share of recognition for taking the Flyweight title and holding it for two years, but Brown would never reach the same level of notoriety holding the title for only eight months and only in the state of California.

=== World Fly champ, 1928 (California) ===
In his next fight Brown won his most important and historic victory by beating Johnny McCoy on January 3, 1928, in a ten round bout for the flyweight world title as recognized in California. According to one source, "The Newsboy had lost only one fight in his last 15 in Los Angeles, and his last appearance–a defeat of Johnny Vacca–had been heralded as one of the best fights ever seen in the Olympic Auditorium." Brown won five rounds, McCoy only three, with two rounds even. Brown led in the first seven rounds, before McCoy came back in the last three, knocking Brown to the canvas in the tenth, but it was too late to take the victory. Nonetheless, the results demonstrated that the boxers were evenly matched. Considering the decision, McCoy had waited too long to take control of the bout.

=== Flyweight Title loss ===
Brown defended the Flyweight title once by beating Filipino Speedy Dado but lost it in when Johnny Hill won a decision over him on August 29, 1928, at the Orient Football Ground in London, becoming the first Scottish boxer to hold a world title. Brown continued to show promise after losing the title, defeating Flyweight world champion Midget Wolgast in Los Angeles in a non-title fight on August 19, 1930, in a decisive ten round bout. Had Wolgast consented to fight the bout for a title, Brown's fame and recognition in the sport would have taken a positive turn. It would not be the first time a title holder would dodge a title match with Brown. New London's The Day wrote, "Midget Wolgast recognized flyweight champ in New York and Pennsylvania, took a severe beating at the hands of Newsboy Brown, Los Angeles veteran trial horse, in a ten round non-title bout here."

Brown defeated Filipino Pablo Dano, a future holder of the World bantam title, on May 20, 1930, in a close ten round points decision unpopular with the audience at Olympic Auditorium in Los Angeles, but correct in the view of the Los Angeles Times. Both boxers skilled defense prevented many shots to the head, making blows to the midsection more common in the match. Brown had lost to Dano five months earlier in San Francisco.

Tommy Gardner, who held the Pacific Coast and Northwest Bantam titles, fell to Brown on June 13, 1930, at Hollywood's Legion Stadium in a ten round points decision. In a fast paced match, Gardner started with some well placed blows but Brown adjusted to his style, and showed superior speed over the course of the bout.

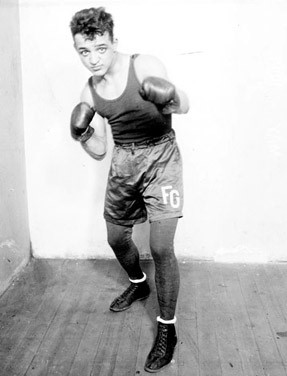
1928 NBA Flyweight Champion Frankie Genaro

Brown was scheduled to meet Frankie Genaro for a second time on September 9, 1930, at the Olympic Auditorium in Los Angeles, but Genaro scheduled to fight Midget Wolgast instead, perhaps fearing that Brown could take back the National Boxing Association World Flyweight Title he held at the time or aware that a fight with champion Wolgast would be bring a bigger audience and be more lucrative. According to the Prescott Evening Courier, "The Olympic Auditorium (where the bout was to take place) has requested the New York Commission to force Genaro to meet Brown here according to a telegraphic agreement...and the New York Athletic Commission has signified it may take similar action if Brown defeats Laredo." Whatever the reason, Brown defeated Mexican boxer Chato Laredo on September 9, 1930, in a decisive ten round match at the Olympic Auditorium but never again met Genaro, nor had a chance at the NBA Flyweight World Title. One explanation may be that Brown was beginning to move up in weight as he had originally scheduled to box Wolgast on September 9 over the flyweight limit. Brown would soon move up a weight class with considerable success.

Brown met Archie Bell in an eight round draw at Queensboro Stadium in Queens on August 18, 1931, in a fast match where much of the action occurred in the last round. Bell was a recognized contender for both the World bantam and featherweight titles in his career.

=== California Bantam state champion ===
He took the USA California Bantamweight State Championship on November 24, 1931, defeating Filipino boxer Young Tommy in a ten round points decision in Olympic Stadium in Los Angeles. He successfully defended it again facing Young Tommy on January 30, 1932, in Los Angeles.

==== Win over Bantam champ Al Brown ====
Though giving up ten inches in height, Newsboy Brown defeated "Panama" Al Brown, the reigning Bantamweight champion of the world on December 15, 1931, in a ten round main event at Los Angeles' Olympic Stadium. Though it was a non-title bout, the Newsboy was said to "carry the fight all the way to the decision", in a surprising upset. Most sources gave the Newsboy six rounds, with only three to Al Brown and one even.

=== World Feather title attempt ===
He fought Speedy Dado twice in 1931, losing one bout and winning the second in a third round knockout in Los Angeles on March 3 for the California State bantam title. In 1932 he fought his last title fight, losing a ten-round decision to Baby Arizmendi for the world featherweight title. According to one source Brown won only one round, explaining his reluctance to continue his career. He retired from boxing in 1933.

His managers included Leo Flynn, Pop Nealis, Joe Levy, and by 1929, Tom Kennedy. In 1931–1932, he was managed by Emmett Ledwith.

== Achievements ==
He was inducted into the International Boxing Hall of Fame in 2012.

Preceded by Fidel LaBarba; Vacated and Appointed Johnny McCoy	World Flyweight Champion (California Only); January 3, 1928– August 29, 1928	Succeeded by Johnny Hill

== Retirement and work in Hollywood ==
After his boxing retirement, he broke into the motion picture business by coaching cowboy star Tom Mix in his fight scenes. As a result of his association with Mix, he landed a job in the properties department of one of the Hollywood studios, where he worked in his later years.

He helped with props for Columbia Picture's 1947 movie Johnny O'Clock directed by Robert Rossen.

He died on February 18, 1977, in Los Angeles, California where he had conducted both his boxing and acting careers.

== Professional boxing record ==
All information in this section is derived from BoxRec, unless otherwise stated.

=== Official record ===
100 fights	58 wins	14 losses
By knockout	14	1
By decision	44	13
Draws	5	
Newspaper decisions/draws	23	

All newspaper decisions are officially regarded as “no decision” bouts and are not counted in the win/loss/draw column.

No.	Result	Record	Opponent	Type	Round, time	Date	Age	Location	Notes
100	Loss	58–14–5 (23)	Rodolfo Casanova	KO	3 (10)	Apr 2, 1933	27 years, 228 days	El Toreo de Cuatro Caminos, Mexico City, Mexico	
99	Loss	58–13–5 (23)	Baby Arizmendi	PTS	10	Oct 18, 1932	27 years, 62 days	Olympic Auditorium, Los Angeles, California, US	For vacant world flyweight title (recognized by California and Great Britain)
98	Loss	58–12–5 (23)	Émile Pladner	PTS	12	Aug 17, 1932	27 years, 0 days	Forum, Montreal, Quebec, Canada	
97	Win	58–11–5 (23)	Baby Arizmendi	PTS	10	Jun 28, 1932	26 years, 316 days	Olympic Auditorium, Los Angeles, California, US	
96	Loss	57–11–5 (23)	Baby Arizmendi	PTS	10	Jun 7, 1932	26 years, 295 days	Olympic Auditorium, Los Angeles, California, US	
95	Win	57–10–5 (23)	Lou Pacion	PTS	12	Apr 2, 1932	26 years, 229 days	Manila, Philippines	
94	Win	56–10–5 (23)	Cris Pineda	SD	12	Mar 19, 1932	26 years, 215 days	Manila, Philippines	Won vacant Oriental bantamweight title
93	Loss	55–10–5 (23)	Young Tommy	PTS	10	Jan 28, 1932	26 years, 164 days	Memorial Auditorium, Sacramento, California, US	Lost USA California State bantamweight title
92	Win	55–9–5 (23)	Panama Al Brown	PTS	10	Dec 15, 1931	26 years, 120 days	Olympic Auditorium, Los Angeles, California, US	
91	Win	54–9–5 (23)	Young Tommy	PTS	10	Nov 24, 1931	26 years, 99 days	Olympic Auditorium, Los Angeles, California, US	Retained USA California State bantamweight title
90	Loss	53–9–5 (23)	Eugène Huat	PTS	12	Oct 7, 1931	26 years, 51 days	Forum, Montreal, Quebec, Canada	
89	Win	53–8–5 (23)	Eugène Huat	PTS	12	Sep 9, 1931	26 years, 23 days	Forum, Montreal, Quebec, Canada	
88	Win	52–8–5 (23)	Archie Bell	PTS	8	Aug 18, 1931	26 years, 1 day	Queensboro Stadium, New York City, New York, US	
87	Win	51–8–5 (23)	Cris Pineda	PTS	10	Aug 6, 1931	25 years, 354 days	Meadowbrook Arena, North Adams, Massachusetts, US	
86	Win	50–8–5 (23)	Ray Montoya	PTS	10	Apr 17, 1931	25 years, 243 days	Legion Stadium, Hollywood, California, US	
85	Win	49–8–5 (23)	Billy Cain	KO	2 (4)	Apr 10, 1931	25 years, 236 days	Dreamland Auditorium, San Francisco, California, US	
84	Win	48–8–5 (23)	Speedy Dado	KO	3 (10)	Mar 3, 1931	25 years, 198 days	Olympic Auditorium, Los Angeles, California, US	Won USA California State bantamweight title
83	Loss	47–8–5 (23)	Speedy Dado	PTS	10	Feb 10, 1931	25 years, 177 days	Olympic Auditorium, Los Angeles, California, US	For vacant USA California State bantamweight title
82	Win	47–7–5 (23)	Claude Varner	PTS	10	Nov 4, 1930	25 years, 79 days	Olympic Auditorium, Los Angeles, California, US	
81	Win	46–7–5 (23)	Claude Varner	PTS	10	Oct 14, 1930	25 years, 58 days	Olympic Auditorium, Los Angeles, California, US	
80	Win	45–7–5 (23)	Chato Laredo	PTS	10	Sep 9, 1930	25 years, 23 days	Olympic Auditorium, Los Angeles, California, US	
79	Win	44–7–5 (23)	Midget Wolgast	PTS	10	Aug 19, 1930	25 years, 2 days	Olympic Auditorium, Los Angeles, California, US	
78	Win	43–7–5 (23)	Tommy Gardner	PTS	10	Jun 13, 1930	24 years, 300 days	Legion Stadium, Hollywood, California, US	
77	Win	42–7–5 (23)	Pablo Dano	PTS	10	May 20, 1930	24 years, 276 days	Olympic Auditorium, Los Angeles, California, US	
76	Loss	41–7–5 (23)	Chato Laredo	SD	8	May 9, 1930	24 years, 265 days	Ciudad Juarez, Mexico	
75	Win	41–6–5 (23)	Tommy Hughes	PTS	10	Nov 22, 1929	24 years, 97 days	Coliseum, San Diego, California, US	
74	Loss	40–6–5 (23)	Pablo Dano	PTS	10	Oct 4, 1929	24 years, 48 days	Dreamland Auditorium, San Francisco, California, US	
73	Win	40–5–5 (23)	Ernie Peters	PTS	10	Sep 27, 1929	24 years, 41 days	Legion Stadium, Hollywood, California, US	
72	Win	39–5–5 (23)	Tommy Hughes	PTS	10	Sep 13, 1929	24 years, 27 days	Legion Stadium, Hollywood, California, US	
71	Win	38–5–5 (23)	Ernie Hood	TKO	7 (10)	Jun 27, 1929	23 years, 314 days	Pasadena Arena, Pasadena, California, US	
70	Win	37–5–5 (23)	Alfredo Imperial	PTS	10	Jun 15, 1929	23 years, 302 days	Pismo Beach Arena, Pismo Beach, California, US	
69	Win	36–5–5 (23)	Blas Rodriguez	PTS	10	Jun 7, 1929	23 years, 294 days	Legion Stadium, Hollywood, California, US	
68	Win	35–5–5 (23)	Ray Montoya	PTS	10	Apr 5, 1929	23 years, 231 days	Coliseum, San Diego, California, US	
67	Draw	34–5–5 (23)	Delos 'Kid' Williams	PTS	10	Feb 1, 1929	23 years, 168 days	Legion Stadium, Hollywood, California, US	
66	Win	34–5–4 (23)	Ernie Peters	PTS	10	Jan 22, 1929	23 years, 158 days	Olympic Auditorium, Los Angeles, California, US	
65	Loss	33–5–4 (23)	Johnny Hill	PTS	15	Aug 29, 1928	23 years, 12 days	Orient Football Ground, Clapton, London, England, UK	Lost world flyweight title (recognized by California and Great Britain)
64	Win	33–4–4 (23)	Speedy Dado	TKO	6 (10)	Apr 24, 1928	22 years, 251 days	Olympic Auditorium, Los Angeles, California, US	Retained world flyweight title (recognized by California)
63	Win	32–4–4 (23)	Howard Mayberry	KO	9 (10)	Mar 23, 1928	22 years, 219 days	Kenwood Armory, Minneapolis, Minnesota, US	
62	Win	31–4–4 (23)	Johnny McCoy	PTS	10	Jan 3, 1928	22 years, 139 days	Olympic Auditorium, Los Angeles, California, US	Won world flyweight title (recognized by California)
61	Loss	30–4–4 (23)	Corporal Izzy Schwartz	UD	15	Dec 16, 1927	22 years, 121 days	Madison Square Garden, New York City, New York, US	For vacant NYSAC flyweight title
60	Loss	30–3–4 (23)	Frenchy Belanger	PTS	10	Oct 28, 1927	22 years, 72 days	Coliseum, Toronto, Ontario, Canada	
59	Win	30–2–4 (23)	Frankie Novey	PTS	10	Sep 15, 1927	22 years, 29 days	Culver City Stadium, Culver City, California, US	
58	Win	29–2–4 (23)	Johnny Stack	KO	7 (?)	Aug 1, 1927	N/A	Culver City, California, US	Exact date unknown
57	Win	28–2–4 (23)	Johnny Vacca	PTS	10	Jun 14, 1927	21 years, 301 days	Olympic Auditorium, Los Angeles, California, US	
56	Win	27–2–4 (23)	Harry Goldstein	PTS	10	May 9, 1927	21 years, 265 days	Mechanics Building, Boston, Massachusetts, US	
55	Win	26–2–4 (23)	Alex Burlie	PTS	10	Apr 18, 1927	21 years, 244 days	Arena Gardens, Toronto, Ontario, Canada	
54	Win	25–2–4 (23)	Ernie Peters	PTS	8	Mar 26, 1927	21 years, 221 days	Coliseum, Chicago, Illinois, US	
53	Loss	24–2–4 (23)	Willie Davies	MD	10	Mar 14, 1927	21 years, 209 days	Motor Square Garden, Pittsburgh, Pennsylvania, US	
52	Win	24–1–4 (23)	Artie Shiere	TKO	4 (10)	Mar 7, 1927	21 years, 202 days	Auditorium, Sioux City, Iowa, US	
51	Win	23–1–4 (23)	Happy Atherton	PTS	10	Feb 5, 1927	21 years, 172 days	Walker AC, New York City, New York, US	
50	Win	22–1–4 (23)	Frankie Genaro	PTS	10	Jan 21, 1927	22 years, 126 days	Madison Square Garden, New York City, New York, US	
49	Win	21–1–4 (23)	Young Nationalista	PTS	10	Dec 21, 1926	21 years, 126 days	Arena, Vernon, California, US	
48	Draw	20–1–4 (23)	Fidel LaBarba	PTS	10	Oct 5, 1926	21 years, 49 days	Arena, Vernon, California, US	
47	Win	20–1–3 (23)	Teddy Silva	PTS	10	Jun 26, 1926	20 years, 313 days	Legion Stadium, Hollywood, California, US	
46	Win	19–1–3 (23)	Johnny Godinez	PTS	8	May 13, 1926	20 years, 269 days	Armory, Pasadena, California, US	
45	Win	18–1–3 (23)	Frankie Novey	PTS	8	Mar 2, 1926	20 years, 197 days	Civic Auditorium, Fresno, California, US	
44	Win	17–1–3 (23)	Young Nationalista	KO	6 (10)	Feb 19, 1926	20 years, 186 days	Legion Stadium, Hollywood, California, US	
43	Win	16–1–3 (23)	Corporal Izzy Schwartz	PTS	10	Nov 27, 1925	20 years, 102 days	Legion Stadium, Hollywood, California, US	
42	Win	15–1–3 (23)	Frankie Genaro	PTS	10	Oct 14, 1925	20 years, 58 days	Olympic Auditorium, Los Angeles, California, US	
41	Win	14–1–3 (23)	Alkie Akol	PTS	8	Aug 19, 1925	20 years, 2 days	Olympic Auditorium, Los Angeles, California, US	
40	Win	13–1–3 (23)	Frankie Grandetta	PTS	6	Aug 5, 1925	19 years, 353 days	Olympic Auditorium, Los Angeles, California, US	
39	Draw	12–1–3 (23)	Young Nationalista	PTS	10	Jun 5, 1925	19 years, 292 days	Legion Stadium, Hollywood, California, US	
38	Loss	12–1–2 (23)	Georgie Rivers	PTS	10	May 1, 1925	19 years, 257 days	Legion Stadium, Hollywood, California, US	
37	Draw	12–0–2 (23)	Fidel LaBarba	PTS	10	Apr 17, 1925	19 years, 243 days	Legion Stadium, Hollywood, California, US	
36	Draw	12–0–1 (23)	Henry 'Kid' Wolfe	PTS	10	Nov 18, 1924	19 years, 93 days	Armory, Reading, Pennsylvania, US	
35	Win	12–0 (23)	Marty Gold	NWS	10	Nov 10, 1924	19 years, 85 days	Arena, Trenton, New Jersey, US	
34	Win	12–0 (22)	Kid Fredericks	NWS	8	Oct 27, 1924	19 years, 71 days	Arena, Trenton, New Jersey, US	
33	Win	12–0 (21)	Johnny Royce	KO	4 (8)	Oct 21, 1924	19 years, 65 days	Armory, Reading, Pennsylvania, US	
32	Win	11–0 (21)	Frankie Murray	PTS	10	Sep 26, 1924	19 years, 40 days	Armory, Boston, Massachusetts, US	
31	Win	10–0 (21)	Willie Woods	PTS	10	Sep 9, 1924	19 years, 23 days	Mechanics Building, Boston, Massachusetts, US	
30	Win	9–0 (21)	Wilbur Cohen	PTS	10	Aug 30, 1924	19 years, 13 days	Commonwealth Sporting Club, New York City, New York, US	
29	Win	8–0 (21)	Kid Pancho	NWS	10	Jun 14, 1924	18 years, 302 days	Auditorium, Sioux City, Iowa, US	
28	Win	8–0 (20)	Johnny Walker	KO	3 (10)	Apr 21, 1924	18 years, 248 days	East Chicago, Indiana, US	
27	Draw	7–0 (20)	Kid Pancho	NWS	12	Mar 4, 1924	18 years, 200 days	Market Hall, San Antonio, Texas, US	
26	Win	7–0 (19)	Kid Pancho	NWS	12	Feb 26, 1924	18 years, 193 days	Market Hall, San Antonio, Texas, US	
25	Win	7–0 (18)	Freddie Dunn	NWS	6	Feb 8, 1924	18 years, 175 days	Auditorium, Sioux City, Iowa, US	
24	Win	7–0 (17)	Paul Milnar	NWS	8	Oct 26, 1923	18 years, 70 days	Auditorium, Des Moines, Iowa, US	
23	Win	7–0 (16)	Jock McFee	NWS	8	Oct 24, 1923	18 years, 68 days	Cedar Rapids, Iowa, US	
22	Win	7–0 (15)	Earl Puryear	NWS	10	Oct 19, 1923	18 years, 63 days	Auditorium, Sioux City, Iowa, US	
21	Win	7–0 (14)	Connie Curry	PTS	10	Oct 8, 1923	18 years, 52 days	City Auditorium, Omaha, Nebraska, US	
20	Draw	6–0 (14)	Connie Curry	NWS	10	Aug 31, 1923	18 years, 14 days	Mizzou Park, Sioux City, Iowa, US	
19	Win	6–0 (13)	Harold Jelsma	KO	3 (8)	Aug 6, 1923	17 years, 354 days	Roof Garden, Sioux City, Iowa, US	
18	Win	5–0 (13)	Paul Milnar	NWS	10	Jul 20, 1923	17 years, 337 days	Mizzou Park, Sioux City, Iowa, US	
17	Win	5–0 (12)	Harold Jelsma	PTS	10	Jul 4, 1923	17 years, 321 days	Newcastle, Nebraska, US	
16	Draw	4–0 (12)	Connie Curry	NWS	10	Jun 13, 1923	17 years, 300 days	Mizzou Park, Sioux City, Iowa, US	
15	Win	4–0 (11)	Harold Jelsma	PTS	6	May 21, 1923	17 years, 277 days	City Auditorium, Lincoln, Nebraska, US	
14	Draw	3–0 (11)	Abie Gordon	NWS	6	Apr 2, 1923	17 years, 228 days	Sportsmen's Club, Sioux City, Iowa, US	
13	Win	3–0 (10)	Benny Rose	KO	3 (8)	Jan 27, 1923	17 years, 163 days	Cudahy Plant Gymnasium, Sioux City, Iowa, US	
12	Win	2–0 (10)	Jimmy Josephs	NWS	6	Aug 21, 1922	17 years, 4 days	Mizzou Park, Sioux City, Iowa, US	
11	Win	2–0 (9)	Earl Smith	NWS	6	Aug 10, 1922	16 years, 358 days	Metropolitan AC, Sioux City, Iowa, US	
10	Win	2–0 (8)	Paul Milnar	NWS	6	Jul 29, 1922	16 years, 346 days	Cudahy Recreation Hall, Sioux City, Iowa, US	
9	Win	2–0 (7)	Jimmy Magner	NWS	8	Jul 4, 1922	16 years, 321 days	Whiting, Iowa, US	
8	Win	2–0 (6)	Jimmy Magner	NWS	8	Jun 24, 1922	16 years, 311 days	Cudahy AC, Sioux City, Iowa, US	
7	Win	2–0 (5)	Duke Duval	NWS	6	Mar 23, 1922	16 years, 218 days	Edgewater Garden, Sioux City, Iowa, US	
6	Draw	2–0 (4)	Connie Curry	NWS	6	Feb 27, 1922	16 years, 194 days	Edgewater Garden, Sioux City, Iowa, US	
5	Draw	2–0 (3)	Connie Curry	NWS	6	Aug 15, 1921	15 years, 363 days	Auditorium, Sioux City, Iowa, US	
4	Win	2–0 (2)	Jack Skelly	NWS	6	Jul 2, 1921	15 years, 319 days	Ballpark, Sioux City, Iowa, US	
3	Win	2–0 (1)	Kid Pitts	KO	1 (6)	May 27, 1921	15 years, 283 days	Auditorium, Sioux City, Iowa, US	
2	Win	1–0 (1)	Dick Stone	NWS	6	May 18, 1921	15 years, 274 days	Auditorium, Sioux City, Iowa, US	
1	Win	1–0	Kid Pitts	TKO	3 (6)	Apr 21, 1921	15 years, 247 days	Auditorium, Sioux City, Iowa, US	

=== Unofficial record ===
100 fights	75 wins	14 losses
By knockout	14	1
By decision	61	13
Draws	11	

Record with the inclusion of newspaper decisions in the win/loss/draw column.

No.	Result	Record	Opponent	Type	Round	Date	Age	Location	Notes
100	Loss	75–14–11	Rodolfo Casanova	KO	3 (10)	Apr 2, 1933	27 years, 228 days	El Toreo de Cuatro Caminos, Mexico City, Mexico	
99	Loss	75–13–11	Baby Arizmendi	PTS	10	Oct 18, 1932	27 years, 62 days	Olympic Auditorium, Los Angeles, California, US	For vacant world flyweight title (recognized by California and Great Britain)
98	Loss	75–12–11	Émile Pladner	PTS	12	Aug 17, 1932	27 years, 0 days	Forum, Montreal, Quebec, Canada	
97	Win	75–11–11	Baby Arizmendi	PTS	10	Jun 28, 1932	26 years, 316 days	Olympic Auditorium, Los Angeles, California, US	
96	Loss	74–11–11	Baby Arizmendi	PTS	10	Jun 7, 1932	26 years, 295 days	Olympic Auditorium, Los Angeles, California, US	
95	Win	74–10–11	Lou Pacion	PTS	12	Apr 2, 1932	26 years, 229 days	Manila, Philippines	
94	Win	73–10–11	Cris Pineda	SD	12	Mar 19, 1932	26 years, 215 days	Manila, Philippines	Won vacant Oriental bantamweight title
93	Loss	72–10–11	Young Tommy	PTS	10	Jan 28, 1932	26 years, 164 days	Memorial Auditorium, Sacramento, California, US	Lost USA California State bantamweight title
92	Win	72–9–11	Panama Al Brown	PTS	10	Dec 15, 1931	26 years, 120 days	Olympic Auditorium, Los Angeles, California, US	
91	Win	71–9–11	Young Tommy	PTS	10	Nov 24, 1931	26 years, 99 days	Olympic Auditorium, Los Angeles, California, US	Retained USA California State bantamweight title
90	Loss	70–9–11	Eugène Huat	PTS	12	Oct 7, 1931	26 years, 51 days	Forum, Montreal, Quebec, Canada	
89	Win	70–8–11	Eugène Huat	PTS	12	Sep 9, 1931	26 years, 23 days	Forum, Montreal, Quebec, Canada	
88	Win	69–8–11	Archie Bell	PTS	8	Aug 18, 1931	26 years, 1 day	Queensboro Stadium, New York City, New York, US	
87	Win	68–8–11	Cris Pineda	PTS	10	Aug 6, 1931	25 years, 354 days	Meadowbrook Arena, North Adams, Massachusetts, US	
86	Win	67–8–11	Ray Montoya	PTS	10	Apr 17, 1931	25 years, 243 days	Legion Stadium, Hollywood, California, US	
85	Win	66–8–11	Billy Cain	KO	2 (4)	Apr 10, 1931	25 years, 236 days	Dreamland Auditorium, San Francisco, California, US	
84	Win	65–8–11	Speedy Dado	KO	3 (10)	Mar 3, 1931	25 years, 198 days	Olympic Auditorium, Los Angeles, California, US	Won USA California State bantamweight title
83	Loss	64–8–11	Speedy Dado	PTS	10	Feb 10, 1931	25 years, 177 days	Olympic Auditorium, Los Angeles, California, US	For vacant USA California State bantamweight title
82	Win	64–7–11	Claude Varner	PTS	10	Nov 4, 1930	25 years, 79 days	Olympic Auditorium, Los Angeles, California, US	
81	Win	63–7–11	Claude Varner	PTS	10	Oct 14, 1930	25 years, 58 days	Olympic Auditorium, Los Angeles, California, US	
80	Win	62–7–11	Chato Laredo	PTS	10	Sep 9, 1930	25 years, 23 days	Olympic Auditorium, Los Angeles, California, US	
79	Win	61–7–11	Midget Wolgast	PTS	10	Aug 19, 1930	25 years, 2 days	Olympic Auditorium, Los Angeles, California, US	
78	Win	60–7–11	Tommy Gardner	PTS	10	Jun 13, 1930	24 years, 300 days	Legion Stadium, Hollywood, California, US	
77	Win	59–7–11	Pablo Dano	PTS	10	May 20, 1930	24 years, 276 days	Olympic Auditorium, Los Angeles, California, US	
76	Loss	58–7–11	Chato Laredo	SD	8	May 9, 1930	24 years, 265 days	Ciudad Juarez, Mexico	
75	Win	58–6–11	Tommy Hughes	PTS	10	Nov 22, 1929	24 years, 97 days	Coliseum, San Diego, California, US	
74	Loss	57–6–11	Pablo Dano	PTS	10	Oct 4, 1929	24 years, 48 days	Dreamland Auditorium, San Francisco, California, US	
73	Win	57–5–11	Ernie Peters	PTS	10	Sep 27, 1929	24 years, 41 days	Legion Stadium, Hollywood, California, US	
72	Win	56–5–11	Tommy Hughes	PTS	10	Sep 13, 1929	24 years, 27 days	Legion Stadium, Hollywood, California, US	
71	Win	55–5–11	Ernie Hood	TKO	7 (10)	Jun 27, 1929	23 years, 314 days	Pasadena Arena, Pasadena, California, US	
70	Win	54–5–11	Alfredo Imperial	PTS	10	Jun 15, 1929	23 years, 302 days	Pismo Beach Arena, Pismo Beach, California, US	
69	Win	53–5–11	Blas Rodriguez	PTS	10	Jun 7, 1929	23 years, 294 days	Legion Stadium, Hollywood, California, US	
68	Win	52–5–11	Ray Montoya	PTS	10	Apr 5, 1929	23 years, 231 days	Coliseum, San Diego, California, US	
67	Draw	51–5–11	Delos 'Kid' Williams	PTS	10	Feb 1, 1929	23 years, 168 days	Legion Stadium, Hollywood, California, US	
66	Win	51–5–10	Ernie Peters	PTS	10	Jan 22, 1929	23 years, 158 days	Olympic Auditorium, Los Angeles, California, US	
65	Loss	50–5–10	Johnny Hill	PTS	15	Aug 29, 1928	23 years, 12 days	Orient Football Ground, Clapton, London, England, UK	Lost world flyweight title (recognized by California and Great Britain)
64	Win	50–4–10	Speedy Dado	TKO	6 (10)	Apr 24, 1928	22 years, 251 days	Olympic Auditorium, Los Angeles, California, US	Retained world flyweight title (recognized by California)
63	Win	49–4–10	Howard Mayberry	KO	9 (10)	Mar 23, 1928	22 years, 219 days	Kenwood Armory, Minneapolis, Minnesota, US	
62	Win	48–4–10	Johnny McCoy	PTS	10	Jan 3, 1928	22 years, 139 days	Olympic Auditorium, Los Angeles, California, US	Won world flyweight title (recognized by California)
61	Loss	47–4–10	Corporal Izzy Schwartz	UD	15	Dec 16, 1927	22 years, 121 days	Madison Square Garden, New York City, New York, US	For vacant NYSAC flyweight title
60	Loss	47–3–10	Frenchy Belanger	PTS	10	Oct 28, 1927	22 years, 72 days	Coliseum, Toronto, Ontario, Canada	
59	Win	47–2–10	Frankie Novey	PTS	10	Sep 15, 1927	22 years, 29 days	Culver City Stadium, Culver City, California, US	
58	Win	46–2–10	Johnny Stack	KO	7 (?)	Aug 1, 1927	N/A	Culver City, California, US	Exact date unknown
57	Win	45–2–10	Johnny Vacca	PTS	10	Jun 14, 1927	21 years, 301 days	Olympic Auditorium, Los Angeles, California, US	
56	Win	44–2–10	Harry Goldstein	PTS	10	May 9, 1927	21 years, 265 days	Mechanics Building, Boston, Massachusetts, US	
55	Win	43–2–10	Alex Burlie	PTS	10	Apr 18, 1927	21 years, 244 days	Arena Gardens, Toronto, Ontario, Canada	
54	Win	42–2–10	Ernie Peters	PTS	8	Mar 26, 1927	21 years, 221 days	Coliseum, Chicago, Illinois, US	
53	Loss	41–2–10	Willie Davies	MD	10	Mar 14, 1927	21 years, 209 days	Motor Square Garden, Pittsburgh, Pennsylvania, US	
52	Win	41–1–10	Artie Shiere	TKO	4 (10)	Mar 7, 1927	21 years, 202 days	Auditorium, Sioux City, Iowa, US	
51	Win	40–1–10	Happy Atherton	PTS	10	Feb 5, 1927	21 years, 172 days	Walker AC, New York City, New York, US	
50	Win	39–1–10	Frankie Genaro	PTS	10	Jan 21, 1927	22 years, 126 days	Madison Square Garden, New York City, New York, US	
49	Win	38–1–10	Young Nationalista	PTS	10	Dec 21, 1926	21 years, 126 days	Arena, Vernon, California, US	
48	Draw	37–1–10	Fidel LaBarba	PTS	10	Oct 5, 1926	21 years, 49 days	Arena, Vernon, California, US	
47	Win	37–1–9	Teddy Silva	PTS	10	Jun 26, 1926	20 years, 313 days	Legion Stadium, Hollywood, California, US	
46	Win	36–1–9	Johnny Godinez	PTS	8	May 13, 1926	20 years, 269 days	Armory, Pasadena, California, US	
45	Win	35–1–9	Frankie Novey	PTS	8	Mar 2, 1926	20 years, 197 days	Civic Auditorium, Fresno, California, US	
44	Win	34–1–9	Young Nationalista	KO	6 (10)	Feb 19, 1926	20 years, 186 days	Legion Stadium, Hollywood, California, US	
43	Win	33–1–9	Corporal Izzy Schwartz	PTS	10	Nov 27, 1925	20 years, 102 days	Legion Stadium, Hollywood, California, US	
42	Win	32–1–9	Frankie Genaro	PTS	10	Oct 14, 1925	20 years, 58 days	Olympic Auditorium, Los Angeles, California, US	
41	Win	31–1–9	Alkie Akol	PTS	8	Aug 19, 1925	20 years, 2 days	Olympic Auditorium, Los Angeles, California, US	
40	Win	30–1–9	Frankie Grandetta	PTS	6	Aug 5, 1925	19 years, 353 days	Olympic Auditorium, Los Angeles, California, US	
39	Draw	29–1–9	Young Nationalista	PTS	10	Jun 5, 1925	19 years, 292 days	Legion Stadium, Hollywood, California, US	
38	Loss	29–1–8	Georgie Rivers	PTS	10	May 1, 1925	19 years, 257 days	Legion Stadium, Hollywood, California, US	
37	Draw	29–0–8	Fidel LaBarba	PTS	10	Apr 17, 1925	19 years, 243 days	Legion Stadium, Hollywood, California, US	
36	Draw	29–0–7	Henry 'Kid' Wolfe	PTS	10	Nov 18, 1924	19 years, 93 days	Armory, Reading, Pennsylvania, US	
35	Win	29–0–6	Marty Gold	NWS	10	Nov 10, 1924	19 years, 85 days	Arena, Trenton, New Jersey, US	
34	Win	28–0–6	Kid Fredericks	NWS	8	Oct 27, 1924	19 years, 71 days	Arena, Trenton, New Jersey, US	
33	Win	27–0–6	Johnny Royce	KO	4 (8)	Oct 21, 1924	19 years, 65 days	Armory, Reading, Pennsylvania, US	
32	Win	26–0–6	Frankie Murray	PTS	10	Sep 26, 1924	19 years, 40 days	Armory, Boston, Massachusetts, US	
31	Win	25–0–6	Willie Woods	PTS	10	Sep 9, 1924	19 years, 23 days	Mechanics Building, Boston, Massachusetts, US	
30	Win	24–0–6	Wilbur Cohen	PTS	10	Aug 30, 1924	19 years, 13 days	Commonwealth Sporting Club, New York City, New York, US	
29	Win	23–0–6	Kid Pancho	NWS	10	Jun 14, 1924	18 years, 302 days	Auditorium, Sioux City, Iowa, US	
28	Win	22–0–6	Johnny Walker	KO	3 (10)	Apr 21, 1924	18 years, 248 days	East Chicago, Indiana, US	
27	Draw	21–0–6	Kid Pancho	NWS	12	Mar 4, 1924	18 years, 200 days	Market Hall, San Antonio, Texas, US	
26	Win	21–0–5	Kid Pancho	NWS	12	Feb 26, 1924	18 years, 193 days	Market Hall, San Antonio, Texas, US	
25	Win	20–0–5	Freddie Dunn	NWS	6	Feb 8, 1924	18 years, 175 days	Auditorium, Sioux City, Iowa, US	
24	Win	19–0–5	Paul Milnar	NWS	8	Oct 26, 1923	18 years, 70 days	Auditorium, Des Moines, Iowa, US	
23	Win	18–0–5	Jock McFee	NWS	8	Oct 24, 1923	18 years, 68 days	Cedar Rapids, Iowa, US	
22	Win	17–0–5	Earl Puryear	NWS	10	Oct 19, 1923	18 years, 63 days	Auditorium, Sioux City, Iowa, US	
21	Win	16–0–5	Connie Curry	PTS	10	Oct 8, 1923	18 years, 52 days	City Auditorium, Omaha, Nebraska, US	
20	Draw	15–0–5	Connie Curry	NWS	10	Aug 31, 1923	18 years, 14 days	Mizzou Park, Sioux City, Iowa, US	
19	Win	15–0–4	Harold Jelsma	KO	3 (8)	Aug 6, 1923	17 years, 354 days	Roof Garden, Sioux City, Iowa, US	
18	Win	14–0–4	Paul Milnar	NWS	10	Jul 20, 1923	17 years, 337 days	Mizzou Park, Sioux City, Iowa, US	
17	Win	13–0–4	Harold Jelsma	PTS	10	Jul 4, 1923	17 years, 321 days	Newcastle, Nebraska, US	
16	Draw	12–0–4	Connie Curry	NWS	10	Jun 13, 1923	17 years, 300 days	Mizzou Park, Sioux City, Iowa, US	
15	Win	12–0–3	Harold Jelsma	PTS	6	May 21, 1923	17 years, 277 days	City Auditorium, Lincoln, Nebraska, US	
14	Draw	11–0–3	Abie Gordon	NWS	6	Apr 2, 1923	17 years, 228 days	Sportsmen's Club, Sioux City, Iowa, US	
13	Win	11–0–2	Benny Rose	KO	3 (8)	Jan 27, 1923	17 years, 163 days	Cudahy Plant Gymnasium, Sioux City, Iowa, US	
12	Win	10–0–2	Jimmy Josephs	NWS	6	Aug 21, 1922	17 years, 4 days	Mizzou Park, Sioux City, Iowa, US	
11	Win	9–0–2	Earl Smith	NWS	6	Aug 10, 1922	16 years, 358 days	Metropolitan AC, Sioux City, Iowa, US	
10	Win	8–0–2	Paul Milnar	NWS	6	Jul 29, 1922	16 years, 346 days	Cudahy Recreation Hall, Sioux City, Iowa, US	
9	Win	7–0–2	Jimmy Magner	NWS	8	Jul 4, 1922	16 years, 321 days	Whiting, Iowa, US	
8	Win	6–0–2	Jimmy Magner	NWS	8	Jun 24, 1922	16 years, 311 days	Cudahy AC, Sioux City, Iowa, US	
7	Win	5–0–2	Duke Duval	NWS	6	Mar 23, 1922	16 years, 218 days	Edgewater Garden, Sioux City, Iowa, US	
6	Draw	4–0–2	Connie Curry	NWS	6	Feb 27, 1922	16 years, 194 days	Edgewater Garden, Sioux City, Iowa, US	
5	Draw	4–0–1	Connie Curry	NWS	6	Aug 15, 1921	15 years, 363 days	Auditorium, Sioux City, Iowa, US	
4	Win	4–0	Jack Skelly	NWS	6	Jul 2, 1921	15 years, 319 days	Ballpark, Sioux City, Iowa, US	
3	Win	3–0	Kid Pitts	KO	1 (6)	May 27, 1921	15 years, 283 days	Auditorium, Sioux City, Iowa, US	
2	Win	2–0	Dick Stone	NWS	6	May 18, 1921	15 years, 274 days	Auditorium, Sioux City, Iowa, US	
1	Win	1–0	Kid Pitts	TKO	3 (6)	Apr 21, 1921	15 years, 247 days	Auditorium, Sioux City, Iowa, US	
