= Johnny Hill =

Scottish boxer (1905–1929)

Personal information
- Nationality: Scottish
- Born: 14 December 1905 Leith, Scotland
- Died: 27 September 1929 (aged 23) Strathmiglo, Fife, Scotland
- Height: 5 ft 3.5 in (161 cm)
- Weight: Flyweight

Boxing career
- Stance: Orthodox

Boxing record
- Total fights: 23
- Wins: 18
- Win by KO: 9
- Losses: 1
- Draws: 3
- No contests: 1

Johnny Hill (14 December 1905 – 27 September 1929) was a Scottish boxer who was British flyweight champion from May 1927, European champion from March 1928, and World champion from August 1928, until his death at the age of 23. He was the first Scottish boxer to win a world title.

== Career ==
Born on Brunswick Road in Leith in 1905, Johnny Hill was trained by his father and Tancy Lee at the Leith Victoria Club. As an amateur he won the Scottish flyweight and bantamweight titles, and in 1926 he won the ABA flyweight title and was awarded the 'Best Boxer of the Championship' trophy.

He made his professional début in September 1926, stopping Bill Huntley in the fifth round at Premierland. He quickly built up a large following, which included the Prince of Wales. Unbeaten in his first 13 fights which included wins over Nicolas Petit-Biquet and Jim Hanna, he faced Alf Barber at the National Sporting Club in May 1927 for the British flyweight title vacated by Elky Clark; Hill stopped Barber in the fourteenth round to become British champion.

He beat Emile Pladner on points in a December 1927, despite being knocked down three times, and four months later faced Pladner again, this time with the European title at stake; The result was the same and Hill added the European title to his British title.

In August 1928 he fought Newsboy Brown in front of a crowd of 50,000 at Clapton Stadium for the vacant World flyweight title (recognised by Great Britain and California State), taking a points decision to become the first Scottish boxer to hold a world title. He was presented with a silver cigarette case by the people of his adopted home of Strathmiglo in September in recognition of his achievement. He was also recognised as World champion by the New York State Athletic Commission on 10 December. Hill and Brown were due to meet again for the World title in October that year, but the fight was cancelled.

In February 1929 he faced Pladner again in a non-title fight, this time in Paris; Pladner knocked Hill out in the sixth round to inflict the only defeat of Hill's 23-fight career.

In March 1929 he successfully defended his British, European, and World titles against Ernie Jarvis at the Royal Albert Hall, taking a points decision. In June 1929 he defended against Jarvis again, this time winning after Jarvis was disqualified in the tenth round for a low blow that left Hill unable to continue.

He was due to face Frankie Genaro in a world title fight on 11 October 1929 but fell ill with pneumonia on 23 September. After two days rest his condition improved but he deteriorated on the night of Thursday 26 September and a burst blood vessel in his lung was diagnosed. He died at 2:30 the following morning at his home in Strathmiglo, Fife. His last words were "Mother, I shall soon be with Jesus now." Genaro, who had arrived in Britain before hearing of Hill's death, attended the funeral in Strathmiglo on 1 October. The funeral was also attended by several other well-known boxers and represented by 22 masonic lodges, including the St. Cyr no. 121, Auchtermuchty, of which Hill was a member.
