= Émile Pladner =

French boxer (1906-1980)

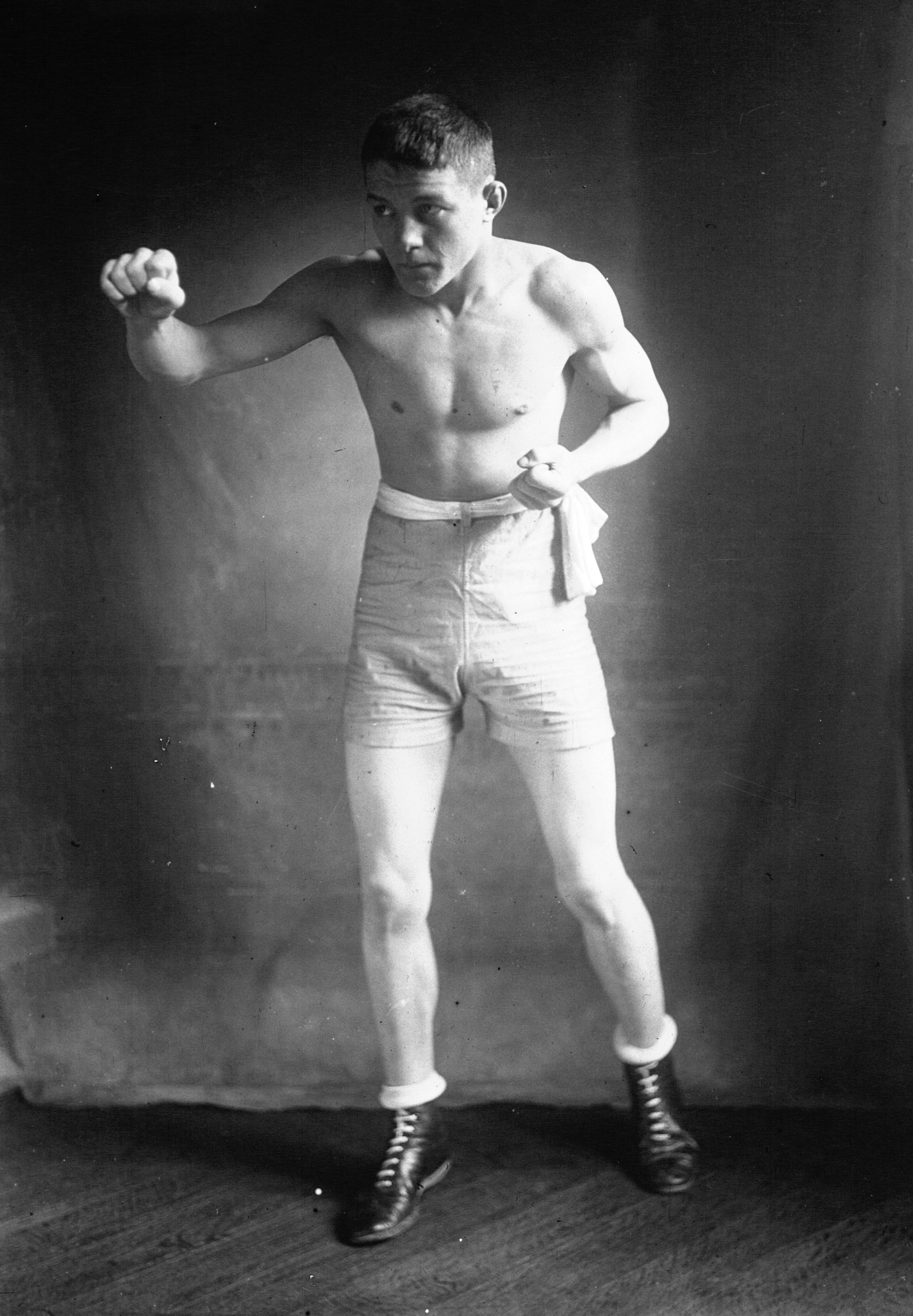

Personal information
- Nicknames: Spider, Milou
- Nationality: French
- Born: 2 September 1906 Clermont-Ferrand, Puy-de-Dôme, France
- Died: 15 March 1980 (aged 73)
- Height: 5 ft 2 in (157 cm)
- Weight: Flyweight, bantamweight

Boxing career
- Reach: 64 in (163 cm)
- Stance: Orthodox

Boxing record
- Total fights: 133
- Wins: 104
- Win by KO: 38
- Losses: 16
- Draws: 13
Medal record
Men's amateur boxing
Representing France
European Amateur Championships
Gold medal – first place	1925 Stockholm	Flyweight

Émile Pladner (2 September 1906 – 15 March 1980) was a French boxer who was flyweight champion of France, Europe, and the world, and bantamweight champion of France and Europe.

== Career ==
Born in Clermont-Ferrand, Puy-de-Dôme, Pladner won a gold medal at the 1925 European Amateur Boxing Championships, and made his professional debut in January 1926 with a win over Rene Boriello. He won his first 13 fights before being held to a draw in January 1927 by Kid Socks. Awarded the French flyweight title after opponent Francois Moracchini withdrew at the last minute, he defended it successfully against Moracchini in February 1927, and over the course of that year added wins over Michel Montreuil, Alf Barber, Nicolas Petit-Biquet, and two further wins over Moracchini. He suffered the first defeat of his career in December 1927 when he lost a points decision to Johnny Hill at the National Sporting Club in London.

Pladner had been due to challenge Victor Ferrand for the latter's European title, but when the champion pulled out, Pladner was awarded the title. Pladner was beaten again by Hill in March 1928 in a fight incorrectly reported in some places as for the European title. He made a successful defence of his French and European titles in May 1928, knocking out Marcel Josie in the twelfth round at the Salle Wagram.

Pladner beat French featherweight champion Robert Tassin in October 1928, and Ernie Jarvis in December, and in February 1929 faced Hill again, this time beating the Scotsman via a sixth-round knockout, the only defeat of Hill's career.

In March 1929, Pladner challenged for Frankie Genaro's IBU and NBA world titles at the Vélodrome d'hiver, Paris. Pladner knocked Genaro out with a body shot within the first minute of the first round to become world champion. Pladner and Genaro met again the next month, with Genero regaining the world title after Pladner was disqualified for a low blow. Pladner expressed an intention to move up to bantamweight, but in June 1929 defended his European and French flyweight titles against Eugene Huat. Huat stopped him in the fifteenth and final round to take the titles.

Pladner won his first fight at bantamweight, beating Kid Socks on points in October 1929. In December 1929, Pladner beat European bantamweight champion Carlos Flix in a non-title fight. After losing to Huat again in May 1930, he put together a run of eleven fights unbeaten, before losing a points decision in April 1931 to Benny Sharkey. In May 1931, he beat Francois Biron on points to take the French bantamweight title, making a successful defence against Biron in September.

In 1932 Pladner travelled to Canada for a series of fights, including a tournament to find a challenger for world champion Panama Al Brown. Pladner won five of these fights, the last a win over Newsboy Brown, with one drawn, and in September 1932 faced the world champion at Maple Leaf Gardens in Toronto. The fight was a short one, with Brown knocking Pladner out in the first round. His Canadian adventure over, Pladner was beaten again by Brown in Paris in November 1932, and was beaten by Young Perez in Tunis in January 1933.

Over the next two years, Pladner lost only two fights (to Perez and Kid Francis), a period that included successful defences of his French bantamweight title against Joseph Decico, Frank Harsen, and Huat. He lost the title in April 1935, Decico taking a points verdict. In July 1935, the IBU recognised Pladner as the European bantamweight champion.

In October 1935, Pladner lost his European title to Maurice Dubois, losing on points. He retired in 1936 with a final record of 104 wins, 16 losses, and 13 draws.
