= Eugène Huat =

French boxer (1907-1980)

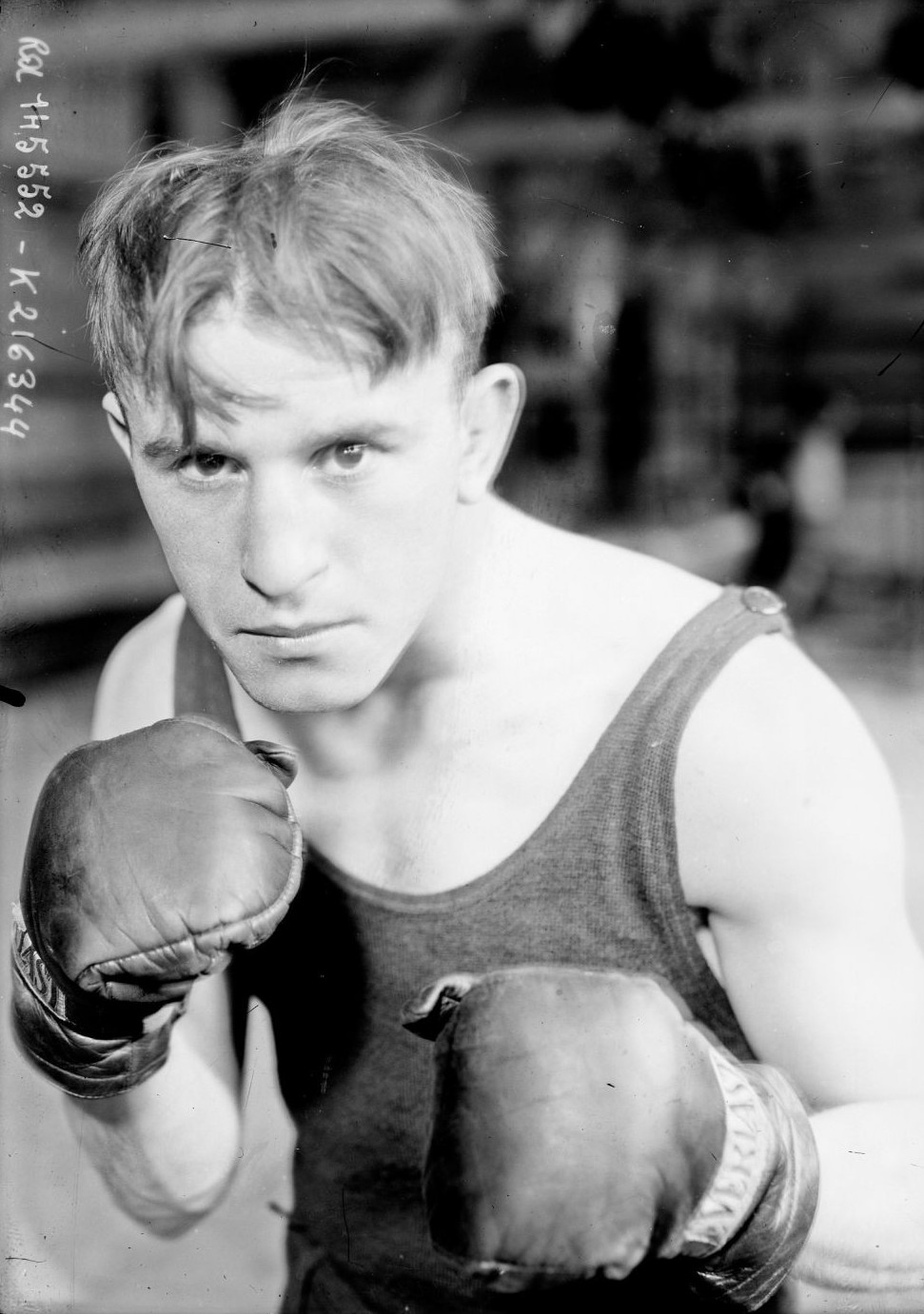
- Portrait of the French boxer Eugène Huat in 1930.

Personal information
- Nickname: Chat-Tigre
- Nationality: French
- Born: 8 February 1907 Reims, France
- Died: December 15, 1980 (aged 73) Paris, France
- Height: 5 ft 1 in (155 cm)
- Weight: Flyweight, bantamweight

Boxing career
- Stance: Orthodox

Boxing record
- Total fights: 133
- Wins: 80
- Win by KO: 41
- Losses: 44
- Draws: 9

Eugène Huat (8 February 1907 – 15 December 1980) was a French boxer who was champion of France and Europe at flyweight, and fought four times for world titles at bantamweight. He was known both as "Le Chat Sauvage" ("The Wildcat") and as Le Chat-Tigre

== Career ==
After making his professional debut in 1926, Huat had some notable wins in his first three years as a pro, beating Maurice Huguenin in January 1927 and November 1928, Rene Chalange in April 1927 and February 1929, Praxille Gydé in November 1927, Kid Oliva in December 1928, and Ernie Jarvis in January 1929.

In June 1929 he beat Émile Pladner on points at the Cirque de Paris to win the French and European flyweight titles. Towards the end of the year he travelled to the United States to take part in a tournament to content the vacant NYSAC world flyweight title; Huat beat Corporal Izzy Schwartz, before losing to Eladio "Black Bill" Valdés in the semi-final.

While in the US, Huat moved up to bantamweight, losing his first fight at the weight to Archie Bell. Huat beat Nicolas Petit-Biquet in April 1930, and Pladner in May, and in October faced Panama Al Brown in Paris for the IBU world bantamweight title, losing on points. In July 1931, Huat challenged for Pete Sanstol's Canadian Boxing Federation & Montreal Athletic Commission-recognised world bantamweight title in Montreal, again losing on points. While still in Montreal, he lost to Newsboy Brown in September 1931, but won a return fight a month later. Three weeks after the second fight, Huat challenged Brown again, with the National Boxing Association world title at stake. Huat again lost on points.

Back in France, Huon put together six straight wins, including victories over Francois Biron, Lucian Popescu, and Len Beynon, before losses to Kid Francis and Panama Al Brown. Later in 1932, Huat travelled again to North America for a largely unsuccessful series of fights.

Huat won the French bantamweight title in August 1933 with a points win over Eugene Lorenzoni, losing it in his first defence to Joseph Decico in March 1934, also losing a rematch three months later.

Despite poor results in the preceding two years, Huat got a fourth world title shot in August 1934 when he challenged for Sixto Escobar's Montreal Athletic Commission title in Montreal. Escobar took a unanimous points verdict.

In January 1935 Huat challenged Pladner for the French title, Pladner stopping him in the seventh round. Over the next three years, Huat continued to fight quality opponents, with wins over Gaston Maton, Young Perez, and Georges Bataille, but also suffered losses to Perez, Peter Kane, and Little Pancho.

Huat was out of the ring for almost three years from June 1938 before making a return in May 1941. He continued to fight until 1942, his penultimate fight a defeat at the hands of Valentin Angelmann.

He finished with a record of 80 wins, 44 defeats, and 9 draws.

After retiring from the ring, Huat went into management, working with boxers such as Pierre Montane, Tony Toniolo, Pierre Langlois, and Jean Jouas.
