= Pinky Silverberg =

American boxer (1904–1964)

Personal information
- Nickname: Young Silverberg
- Nationality: (United States) American
- Born: Pincus Silverberg; April 5, 1904 The Bronx, New York
- Died: January 16, 1964 (aged 59) Ansonia, Connecticut
- Weight: Flyweight

Boxing career
- Stance: Orthodox

Boxing record
- Total fights: 82
- Wins: 34
- Win by KO: 5
- Losses: 34
- Draws: 14
- No contests: 0

Pinky Silverberg (April 5, 1904 – January 16, 1964) was a Connecticut-based American boxer who briefly held the National Boxing Association (NBA) World Flyweight title in late 1927. With an efficient defense, Silverberg was knocked out only once in his career by Willie LaMorte in 1926. His managers were Johnny Herman, Lou Anger, and Joe Smith. Problems with his hands, which were often broken during his career, may have hampered many of his boxing performances.

== Early life and career ==
Pinky Silverberg was born into a Jewish family in the Bronx on April 5, 1904. He would eventually become one of six siblings, with three other boys and two girls. His father relocated to Ansonia, Connecticut, in 1920 to find work in one of the many factories in the Naugatuck Valley.

Silverberg began his career in 1920 when he was only 16 by adding two years to his age so he could begin boxing professionally. His older brother Herman, who may have influenced his choice to be a boxer, was also a featherweight known as "Kid Silvers" and fought feature bouts in New York boxing clubs. Between September 1920, and June 1925, Pinky fought twenty-seven bouts almost exclusively in the Connecticut area, losing only three, and winning fourteen, with three by knockout. The nine draws among his initial bouts indicated that his rise to prominence was gradual but that he learned from these bouts and over time improved his technique.

== Connecticut Flyweight title, October 1925 ==
Silverberg took the Connecticut Flyweight Championship on October 17, 1925, against Al Beuregard at the Opera House in Ansonia, Connecticut, in a ten-round points decision. The important win heralded his emergence as a potential flyweight contender.

== Knockout loss, Willie LaMorte, April 1926 ==
Willie LaMorte

In what may well have been his only loss by knockout, on April 5, 1926, Silverberg lost to accomplished boxer Willie LaMorte at Footguard Hall in Hartford, Connecticut, in a difficult bout lasting only three rounds. Apparently LaMorte had Silverberg down cold, as Pinky lost to LaMorte again on June 25, 1928, at Laurel Garden in Newark, New Jersey in a ten-round points decision. According to the Newark Star-Eagle, LaMorte floored Silverberg in the first round, taking all but two of the rounds in the bout.

== Bouts with Black Bill, 1927–28 ==
Fighting at only 113 pounds, on January 19, 1927, Silverberg lost to black Cuban boxer Eladio Valdes known as Black Bill at the Walker Athletic Club in New York in a six-round points decision. The bout was a benefit for the great black boxer Sam Langford. A noteworthy black Cuban flyweight at the time, Black Bill would later contend for the NYSAC World Flyweight Championship in March 1930 against Midget Wolgast. Silverberg would lose to Black Bill again in a six-round points decision on December 29, 1928, at the Olympia Athletic Club in New York.

=== First bout with Ruby Bradley, January 1926 ===
On January 27, 1926, Silverberg first met Ruby (Dark Cloud) Bradley in Hartford, Connecticut losing in an eight-round points decision. In a close bout, the hometown paper, the Hartford Courant, questioning the decision, wrote, "Silverberg outsmarted Bradley, he carried the fight to Bradley and his punches were straighter and truer, he looked good to everybody except the third man in the Ring (referee)." Bradley was a top Black flyweight contender who was rated as the third best flyweight in the world by Ring Magazine in 1931.

== NBA World Flyweight title, October 1927 ==
Silverberg won the NBA World Flyweight Championship vacated by Fidel LaBarba, who had recently retired, by defeating Ruby "Dark Cloud" Bradley in Bridgeport, Connecticut on October 22, 1927, when Bradley was disqualified for delivering a low blow to Silverberg in the seventh round. Silverberg was unable to continue the bout due to the injury. Some boxing officials may have felt that Silverberg's title was not as fully justifiable due to his win by disqualification, though the World Championship Title belt was presented to Silverberg officially by the NBA commissioner a few weeks after his win.

=== World Fly title stripped, December 1927 ===
Ruby Bradley was a flyweight boxer who had taken the New England Flyweight Championship in late 1926, but likely not the most notable boxer Silverberg would face in his career. Bradley would never take a world title, and contend only once for the NYSAC Flyweight Championship unsuccessfully later in his career.

Silverberg met Bradley again on December 3, 1927, in a fateful match that was contested above the flyweight limit at the State Armory in Bridgeport, Connecticut, and was therefore not a title bout. Bradley beat him in a ten-round unanimous decision. Only a few days after the match, the President of the NBA stripped Silverberg of the title for an "unsatisfactory showing" in the bout. As a boxing historian later put it, "it remains the only time in boxing history that a champion was shorn of a legitimately won championship due to a poor performance in a non-title bout." Silverberg was boxing with a broken hand in the bout which hampered his performance, adding to the injustice of stripping him of his title.

After his loss to Bradley, Silverberg began boxing exclusively as a bantamweight at a weight range of 112 to 118 pounds. The poster of Silverberg at right, published around 1928, shows his new status as a bantamweight contender, and lists many of the boxers he met formerly as a flyweight.

Due to a power struggle within the organization's hierarchy, the NBA never achieved a consensus to restore the championship to Silverberg. Adding to the confusion, there was no single organization at the time that sanctioned a World Flyweight Champion, and in the 1920s over a dozen World Flyweight Champions were recognized by the New York State Athletic Commission (NYSAC), and the European Boxing Union (EBU). Though he would meet a few of the era's greatest boxers near his weight class, Silverberg would never have the opportunity to fight in a title bout again.

At 116 pounds, on July 24, 1928, Silverberg lost to Norwegian Pete Sanstol at Queensboro Stadium in Queens, in a six-round points decision. An accomplished opponent, Sanstol would later take the World Bantamweight Championship on May 20, 1931, against Archie Bell in Montreal.

=== Loss to Archie Bell, September 1928 ===
Silverberg met fellow New England Jewish contender Archie Bell on September 22, 1928, in a feature bout at the Ridgewood Grove in Bell's hometown of Brooklyn, losing in a six-round points decision. Bell would contend several times for but never take a world title. A talented contender, in May 1927, Bell had competed for the British version of the World Bantamweight Title in London, but lost a fifteen-round decision. Later in his career in 1932–2, he would contend for the World Bantamweight Title again in Britain, and twice for the California version of the World Featherweight Title.

== Bout with future Feather Champ Kid Chocolate, 1928 ==
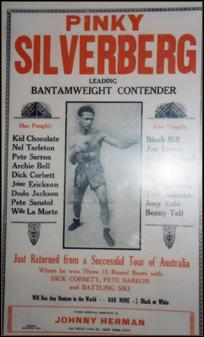
1928 Poster of Silverberg

At 118 pounds, on November 8, 1928, Silverberg lost to Black boxer Kid Chocolate, then a sensational Cuban bantamweight, at New York's St. Nicholas Arena, in a ten-round points decision. The Kid won easily on points but did not score a significant knockdown of Silverberg throughout the bout. In his career after 1930, Chocolate would take the NBA World Super Featherweight, and NYSAC World Featherweight titles. The January 2002 Ring Magazine once rated Chocolate as the fifth greatest featherweight of all time. Remaining on his feet for six rounds with the Kid was no small victory for Silverberg, demonstrating he could stand in the ring with some of the greatest boxers of the era. Kid Chocolate is listed first among the boxers Silverberg fought in black print on the poster at right. Chocolate's name appears in the column on the left of his photo in the poster.

On May 25, 1929, Silverberg lost to Petey Sarron, future NBA World Featherweight Champion, in an important fifteen round points decision in Melbourne, Australia. Both boxers fought in the featherweight range at 120 pounds. The poster at right shows Silverberg announcing his status as a bantamweight contender, and noting his return from Australia in 1929. It also lists many of the fighters he had fought up to that point in his career including Pete Sarron, in red near the bottom of the poster, as well as in black on the left of his picture.

== Loss to future British fly champ Nel Tarleton, 1929 ==
At 122 pounds, on November 11, 1929, Silverberg lost to exceptional English flyweight Nel Tarleton in a ten-round points decision at the Nicholas Arena in New York. Tarleton would first take the British (BBOC) Featherweight Title in October 1931. Tarleton easily won the contest taking every round but the tenth. Fighting at 125, Silverberg gave up three pounds to his opponent.

== Loss to Bantam Champ Al Brown, 1930 ==
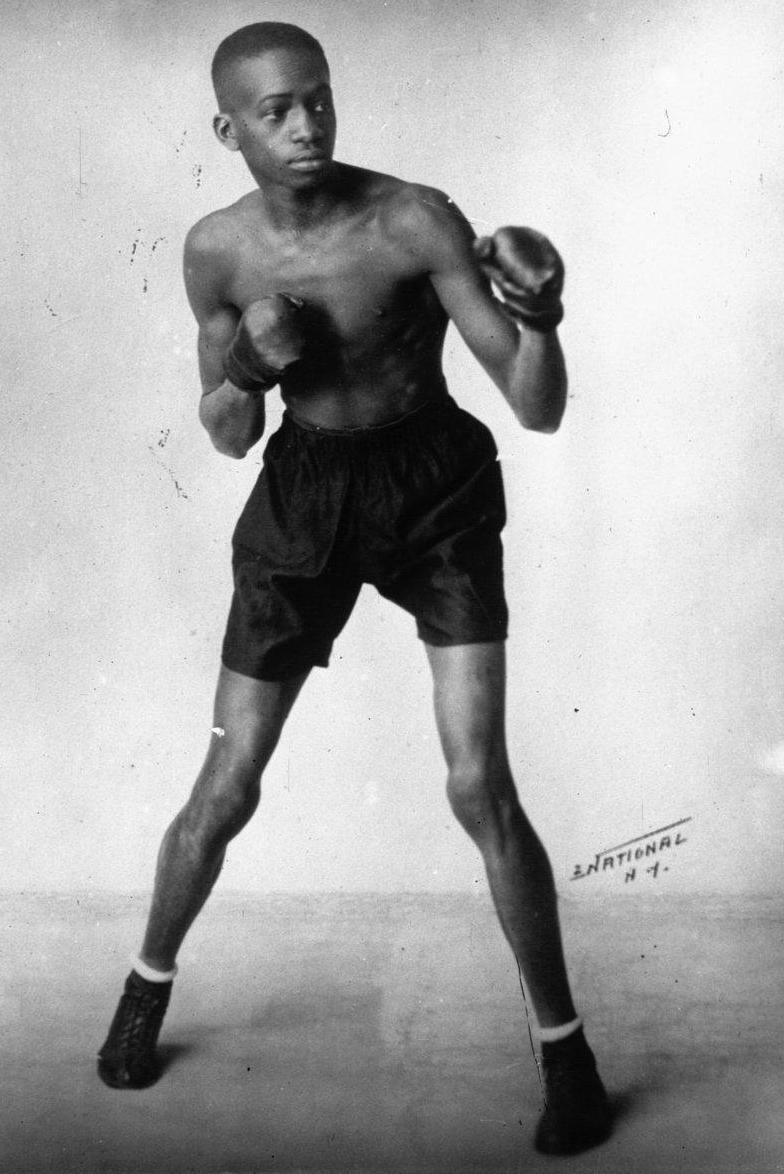
Panama Al Brown

On January 25, 1930, Silverberg lost to Panama Al Brown reigning NBA World Bantamweight Champion, in a non-title ten round points decision at the Arena Polar in Havana, Cuba. At 5' 9", using his five-inch advantage in height and reach, Brown was in command throughout the fight. A defensive master, Brown nullified all of Silverberg's advances with effective left jabs and hard rights, though there were no knockdowns in the bout. Silverberg demonstrated he could remain on his feet with some of the best boxers of his era. Brown had taken the NYSAC Bantamweight Champion against Gregorio Vidal on June 18, 1929, in New York, later gaining NBA recognition for the title as well.

== Bouts with Fly champ Midget Wolgast, 1930–31 ==
On March 9, 1931, Silverberg met Midget Wolgast, for the last time, at the Park Arena in Bridgeport, Connecticut losing in a ten-round points decision. Silverberg could not manage the speedy attack of Wolgast. The two contenders had previously met in important non-title bouts on March 10 and May 8, 1930, in Queens, N. Y., and Philadelphia, Pennsylvania where Silverberg lost in 10 and 8 round points decisions.

In March 1930, Wolgast had impressively taken the NYSAC World Flyweight Title against Black Bill at Madison Square Garden. He clinched the title in May 1930 against Willie LeMorte. Several boxing websites rated Wolgast the eighth greatest flyweight of all time.

== Life after boxing ==
Silverberg won his last known fight, a four rounder against Frankie Reese at Star Casino in New York.

After his retirement from the ring, he stayed in touch with boxing and promoted fights, refereed local bouts, and coached ring science as a volunteer at a local YMCA in the 1940s.

In the fall of 1950, Silverberg was the subject of legal prosecution and conviction for the entertainment provided at a large gala held at his newly opened gymnasium in Ansonia. Silverberg was known in Ansonia for his campaign work in a local mayoral election.

By the early 1950s Silverberg was working as an inspector for aircraft engines at AVCO Lycoming in Stratford, Connecticut near his hometown of Ansonia. He fought in the Connecticut area and lived in Ansonia during much of his early life and career.

Silverberg recovered from a heart attack in 1959, though it was not his first. He died at his home in Ansonia on January 16, 1964, after another heart attack at the age of 59. He was survived by his wife and two children, Janis, and Ron. Prior to the year 2000, Silverberg's boxing achievements were given little or no coverage by on-line boxing sites, and published boxing histories.

== Selected fights ==
2 Wins, 10 Losses
Result	Opponent(s)	Date	Location	Duration	Notes
Win	Al Beuregard	Oct 17, 1925	Ansonia, CT	10 Rounds	Won USA Connecticut Fly Title
Loss	Ruby Bradley	Jan 7, 1926	Hartford, CT	8 Rounds	-
Loss	Willie LaMorte	Apr 5, 1926	Hartford, CT	3rd Round TKO	-
Loss	Black Bill	Jan 19, 1927	New York	6 Rounds	-
Win	Ruby Bradley	Oct 22, 1927	Bridgeport, CT	7th Round DQ; Low blow	Won NBA World Fly Title
Loss	Ruby Bradley	Dec 3, 1927	Bridgeport, CT	10 Rounds	Stripped of NBA World Fly Title
Loss	Willie LaMorte	Jun 25, 1928	Newark, NJ	10 Rounds	-
Loss	Archie Bell	Sep 22, 1928	Brooklyn, NY	6 Rounds	-
Loss	Archie Bell	Sep 22, 1928	Brooklyn, NY	6 Rounds	-
Loss	Petey Sarron	May 25, 1929	Melbourne, Aus.	15 Rounds	-
Loss	Nel Tarleton	Nov 11, 1929	St. Nicks Arena, NY City	15 Rounds	-
Loss	Panama Al Brown	Jan 25, 1930	Havana, Cuba	10 Rounds	Brown was World Fly champ

== Achievements and honors ==
Achievements
Preceded by Fidel LaBarba	Flyweight Boxing Champion; October 22, 1927 – Stripped December 1927	Succeeded by Frankie Genaro

Silverberg was inducted into the Connecticut Boxing Hall of Fame on November 30, 2007.
