= Isadore Schwartz =

American boxer (1900–1988)

Corporal Izzy Schwartz
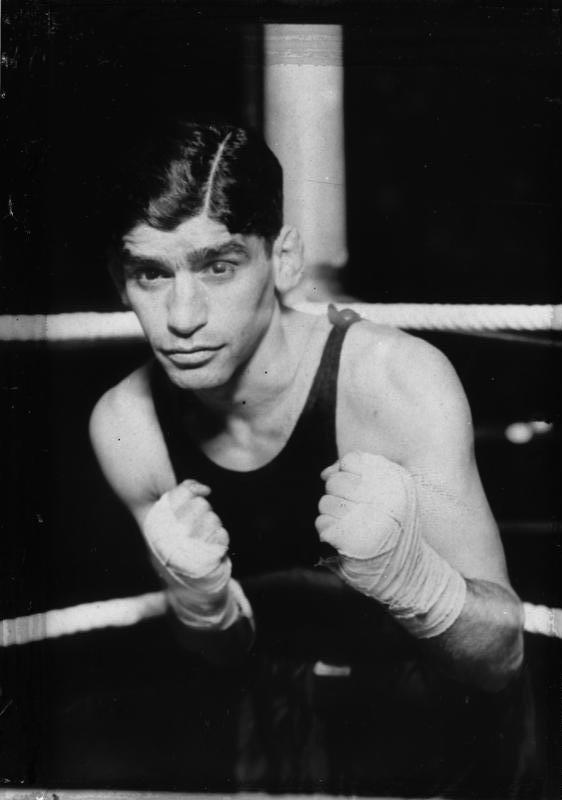
- Schwartz circa 1928

Personal information
- Nicknames: The Ghetto Midget; Izzy Schwartz
- Nationality: American
- Born: Isadore Schwartz; July 23, 1900 New York
- Died: July 8, 1988 (aged 87)
- Height: 5 ft 1 in (1.55 m)
- Weight: Flyweight

Boxing career
- Reach: 62 in (157 cm)
- Stance: Orthodox

Boxing record
- Total fights: 125
- Wins: 70
- Win by KO: 7
- Losses: 34
- Draws: 16
- No contests: 5

Isadore "Corporal Izzy" Schwartz (July 23, 1900 – July 8, 1988) was an American boxer, who became recognized as the New York Boxing Commission's World Flyweight Champion from 1927 to 1929. His manager was Phil Bernstein. He was inducted into the International Jewish Sports Hall of Fame in 1998. Though never having much of a knockout punch, in 115 professional bouts between 1922 and 1929, he scored 15 knockouts, 50 decisions, 12 draws, 8 no-decisions, and lost only 28 times.

== Early life ==
Schwartz was born in New York's East Village on October 23, 1902, not far from the neighborhood of Jewish Lightweight Champion Benny Leonard. Both his parents died when he was two years old, and he was forced to spend the remainder of his youth in a Jewish orphanage.

Fleeing the oppressiveness of a job he took as a factory clerk after high school, Izzy enlisted in the army in World War I. Being underweight, he barely passed the physical required for army enlistment. After an officer observed him holding his own in a brawl at his base at Laredo, Texas, he was given the opportunity to represent his company in boxing competitions. According to one source which may be embellished, the army brawl that launched his career took place when Izzy was barely eighteen around 1919, and was precipitated when Schwartz, refusing to loan money to a fellow soldier, received an ethnic slur. Izzy took advantage of the opportunity to box competitively, traveling frequently between army bases to take on flyweight competitors, until he was eventually crowned the Army's Flyweight Champion. Schwartz's first official bout in the Army was a torrid match with Kid Pancho, whom he fought to a fifteen-round draw despite being outweighed by eight pounds.

== Pro career ==
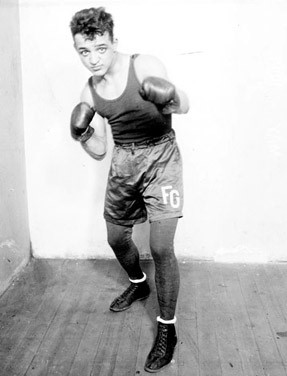
Sparring partner, and 1928 NBA Flyweight Champion Frankie Genaro

After leaving the army as a gifted young competitor, he returned to New York to begin a career as a professional flyweight boxer. He was fortunate to have the opportunity to spar frequently in his early career with the exceptional flyweight boxer Frankie Genaro, who would later become a more widely recognized World Flyweight Champion. Beginning his career, Schwartz lost to Kid Durand in seven rounds, but defeated Vincent Salvatore, Kid Corona, and Indian Russel. He lost to Al Felder, Sammy Bienfeld, and Henry Catena. Impressively, he fought fifty times before suffering his first knockout. In his peak years between 1926–27, he won 19 of 25 bouts with only two draws.

=== Taking the NYSAC Flyweight World Title ===
After victories from Billy Kelly, Blas Rodriguez, Willie Davies, and Benny Hall in late 1927, Schwartz was chosen to meet Newsboy Brown for the flyweight title by the New York State Boxing Commission. Izzy defeated Brown in a fifteen-round semi-final bout by unanimous decision in New York's Madison Square Garden on December 16, 1927 and was declared the New York State Athletic Commission's World Flyweight Champion.

The title had been left vacant by famed flyweight Fidel LaBarba, a student at Stanford University. Of the championship bout, one source noted that Schwartz possessed greater speed in his right cross then Brown, but nonetheless, Brown "drew blood from Schwartz's left ear" in the sixth, and in the ninth, had Schwartz's "left eye open and bleeding." Another source attributed superior speed to Schwartz's victory, noting "he proved himself too fast, shifty, clever, and resourceful for the plodding Brown." and that he won "hands down amidst a thunderous outburst of approving critics from the approving crowd. Continually depicted by the press as an underdog, even in this his greatest victory, the Reading Times described Schwartz as a "frail-looking soldier warrior", and noted he was outweighed four pounds by Newsboy Brown.

He defended his crown against Chilean boxer Roubier Parra on April 9, 1928. In May, he stepped up in class to fight Bushy Graham for the bantamweight title, but lost the fifteen round bout. Schwartz started the fight favorably, but by the end, "Bushy made use of his weight advantage, and Izzy "tired and fell under the gruelling pace." Schwartz had two more successful defenses of the flyweight title against Frisco Grande and Little Jeff Smith, but after a string of losses to boxers Willie La Morte, Willie Davies, Eugène Huat, and Harry Fiero in four successive non-title bouts, he made his first retirement from boxing in 1930. His bout with Willie LaMorte was to have been for a title, but there was controversy surrounding the fight as Schwartz told the press his manager "was in the other guy's corner", and had suspiciously switched sides to LaMorte only the night before. There were suspicions by some that the fight was fixed, as according to Blady, the press gave Schwartz ten out of the fight's fifteen rounds, despite losing the decision. For these reasons and perhaps others, though LaMorte officially won the bout, he was not given the Flyweight title by the New York State Athletic Commission. Technically, Schwartz retired from the ring for the first time in 1930, still Flyweight Champion.

== Achievements ==
Preceded by NBA Champion Fidel LaBarba; Vacated	NYSAC World Flyweight Champion; December 16, 1927– Schwartz retired November 4, 1929	Succeeded by NBA Champion Frankie Genaro

== Retirement from boxing and later life ==
After losing to Eugène Huat on November 4, 1929, Schwartz announced a premature retirement and began to sell insurance for a living.

Schwartz came out of retirement in 1930, and defeated Jack Terranova, and Freddie Lattanzio in 1932. When he was knocked out boxing Filio Echevarria in Havanna Cuba, on May 7, 1932, he officially retired.

Schwartz worked for the army again in World War II, directing athletics at the Shenango Replacement Training Center near Pittsburgh, Pennsylvania, after completing a tour of duty overseas. He scheduled boxing tournaments at the center, and continued to spar occasionally to remain fit.

Taking on his father's profession, and following in the footsteps of many retired Jewish boxers who worked for movie studios, he got a job as a motion picture projectionist, and worked for MGM at their headquarters in New York. He worked as a projectionist in a variety of other metropolitan locations as well. According to Ken Blady, he may have worked as a projectionist as long as fifty years, later taking on work as a financial secretary for the Motion Picture's Projectionist's Union, and as President of Ring 8, a veteran boxer's association.

He had two children with his wife Sarah, with whom he was married over sixty years. Both sons worked in movies, one as a projectionist, and one as a film editor. He died in July 1988.

== See also ==
- List of select Jewish boxers
