= Boxing at the 1924 Summer Olympics – Flyweight =

Flyweight boxing at the Games of the VIII Olympiad
- Venue: Vélodrome d'hiver
- Dates: July 15–20, 1924
- Competitors: 19 from 13 nations

Medalists
1st place, gold medalist(s)		Fidel LaBarba	United States
2nd place, silver medalist(s)		James McKenzie	Great Britain
3rd place, bronze medalist(s)		Raymond Fee	United States

The men's flyweight event was part of the boxing programme at the 1924 Summer Olympics. The weight class was the lightest contested, and allowed boxers of up to 112 pounds (50.8 kilograms). The competition was held from July 15, 1924, to July 20, 1924. 19 boxers from 13 nations competed.

== Results ==
Round of 32; July 15
Gaetano Lanzi (ITA)	PTS
Andrés Recalde (URU)	L
Fidel LaBarba (USA)	PTS
Teddy Warwick (GBR)	L
Raymond Trève (FRA)	PTS
Lucien Debleyser (BEL)	L

Round of 16; July 16
Rinaldo Castellenghi (ITA)	PTS
Georges Gourdy (FRA)	L
Ruperto Biete (ESP)	PTS
Myles McDonagh (IRL)	L
Samuel Rennie (CAN)	PTS
R. Nyffeler (SUI)	L
Gaetano Lanzi (ITA)	L
Fidel LaBarba (USA)	RSC2
Raymond Trève (FRA)	L
Oscar Bergström (SWE)	KO1
Raymond Fee (USA)	PTS
Vicente Catada (ARG)	L
Jock MacGregor (CAN)	PTS
Lorenzo Vitria (ESP)	L
James McKenzie (GBR)	KO3
Leo Turksma (NED)	L

Quarterfinals; July 18
Rinaldo Castellenghi (ITA)	PTS
Ruperto Biete (ESP)	L
Samuel Rennie (CAN)	L
Fidel LaBarba (USA)	PTS
Oscar Bergström (SWE)	L
Raymond Fee (USA)	PTS
Jock MacGregor (CAN)	L
James McKenzie (GBR)	PTS

Semifinals; July 19
Rinaldo Castellenghi (ITA)	L
Fidel LaBarba (USA)	PTS
Raymond Fee (USA)	L
James McKenzie (GBR)	PTS

Final; July 20
Fidel LaBarba (USA)	PTS
James McKenzie (GBR)	L
Bronze medal bout
Raymond Fee (USA)	W
Rinaldo Castellenghi (ITA)	wo

== Sources ==
- official report
- Wudarski, Pawel (1999). "Wyniki Igrzysk Olimpijskich" (in Polish).
