= Harry Stein =

Harry Stein may refer to:

- Harry Stein (author) (born 1948), American author and columnist
- Harry Stein (communist) (1919 – 1994), Australian communist and jazz enthusiast
- Harry Stein (boxer) (1905–?), German boxing champion
- Harry Stein (writer), American comic book writer active in the 1940s and co-creator of the character The Heap
- Harry Stein (character), a fictional character in DC Comics created in 1985
- Harry Stine (businessman) (born 1941), American farmer, agribusinessman, billionaire, and richest person in Iowa
