= Lucien Debleyser =

Belgian boxer

Lucien Debleyser (born 13 February 1904, date of death unknown) was a Belgian boxer who competed in the 1924 Summer Olympics. In 1924 he was eliminated in the first round of the flyweight class after losing his fight to Raymond Trève.
