= Lorenzo Vitria =

Spanish boxer (1908–1941)

Llorenç Vitrià Barrera (2 February 1908, in Barcelona – 18 June 1941, in Gusen, Austria) was a Spanish boxer who competed in the 1924 Summer Olympics.

In 1924 he was eliminated in the second round of the flyweight class after losing his fight to Jock MacGregor. Due his exile to France after the Spanish Civil War, he was deported to the Mauthausen concentration camp in Austria in 1940 and he died in 1941 in Gusen (an external concentration camp of Mauthausen).
