= Baby Yack =

Canadian boxer (1915–1987)

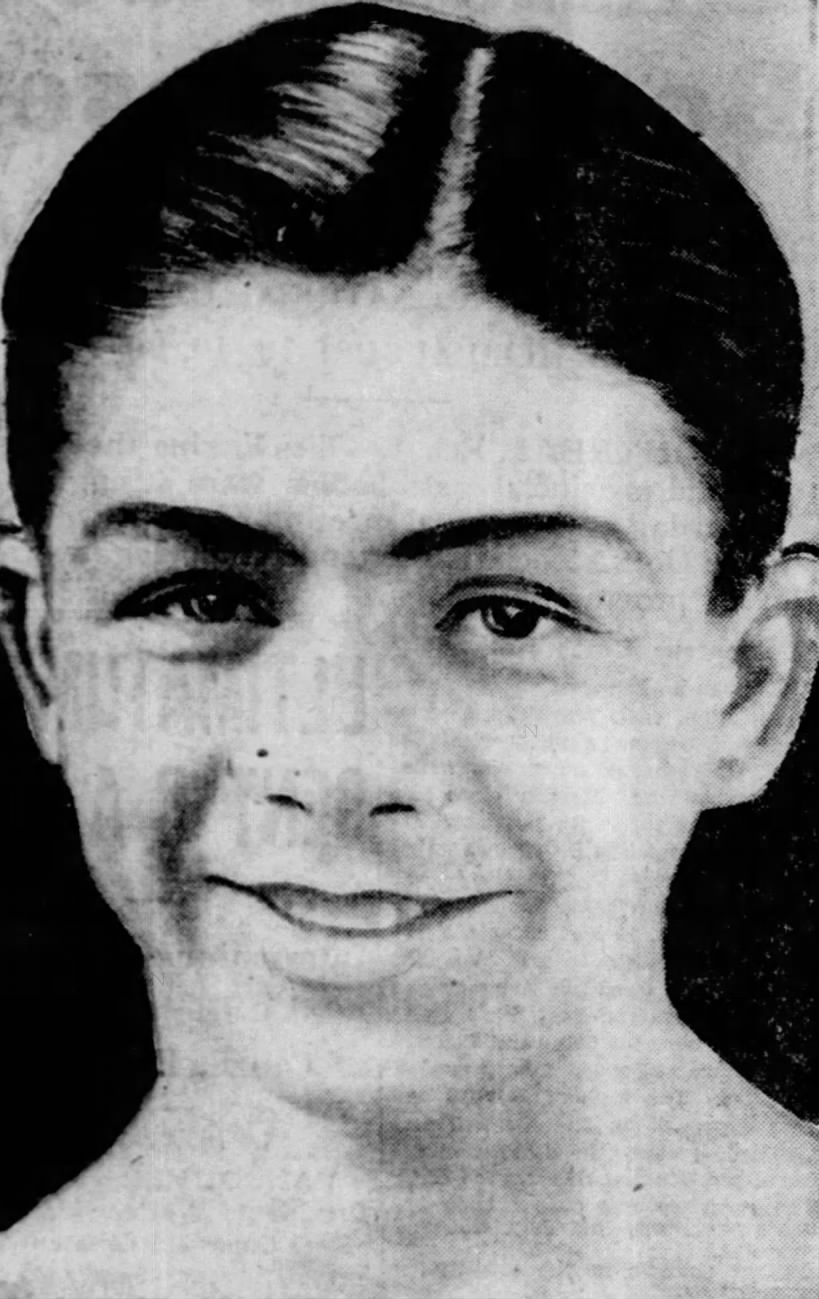

Personal information
- Nickname: Baby Yack
- Nationality: (Canada) Canadian
- Born: Benjamin Norman Yakubowitz; December 25, 1915 Toronto, Ontario, Canada
- Died: January 11, 1987 (aged 71) Toronto, Ontario, Canada
- Occupation: Boxer
- Height: 5 ft 5 in (165cm)
- Weight: Bantamweight

Boxing career
- Stance: Orthodox

Boxing record
- Total fights: 37
- Wins: 23
- Win by KO: 4
- Losses: 13
- Draws: 1

Baby Yack (born Benjamin Norman Yakubowitz; December 25, 1915 – January 11, 1987) was a Jewish-Canadian professional bantamweight boxer. He held the Canadian bantamweight boxing championship from 1936 to 1938.

== Early life ==
Benjamin Norman Yakubowitz, the second of three sons, was born on December 25, 1915, to Bessie Yakubowitz. Emigrating from the Kyiv region of the Soviet Union in 1903, the Yakubowitzes settled in the tough Toronto neighborhood bounded by Baldwin, Palmerston, Bathurst, and Queen.

His early fighting instincts were honed in downtown Toronto as a newsboy during the 1920s, where he defended his newspaper corner from older boys.

== Amateur boxing career ==
Yakubowitz, a former Toronto newsboy, began boxing at the age of 13. He went by his middle name and abbreviated his last name from Yakubowitz to Yack in the ring. He received the nickname "Baby" on account of being younger than his older brother, Dave Yack.

He began competing in amateur boxing events at the local Young Men's Hebrew Association on Brunswick Avenue at College Street by 1932.

In January 1933, the 16-year-old represented the Elm Grove Athletic Club in the 105-pound division, posting a record of 18 amateur bouts with only one defeat.

Yack was named to Canada's 1936 Olympic boxing team but, with Sammy Luftspring, refused to compete in Berlin. Their protest, published as a letter in the Toronto Globe on July 6, 1936, denounced Germany's treatment of Jews. The two boxers, both Jewish, became the first to boycott the Olympics on principle. The Toronto boxer later took part in the People's Olympiad in Barcelona, Spain. He and Luftspring, aided by salesman Harry Sniderman, set off for the alternative meet, crossing the Atlantic by boat in ten days and then traveling ten hours by train to Toulouse. The team reached France, only to learn that the event in Barcelona had been cancelled as a result of the Spanish Civil War.

== Professional career ==
Norman Yack made his professional debut at Maple Leaf Gardens in Toronto in 1936, fighting as a bantamweight.

He went 6–0 before facing Angelo Callura, brother of Jackie Callura, on June 8, 1937, in a six-round fight where Callura handed him his first loss.

He rose from earning $50 as a preliminary fighter to becoming a main headliner in Toronto, drawing $1,000 per bout. In training for his first main event in 1937, he was handled by Mottle Goldman and Steve Rocco, who had previously held the Canadian flyweight title.

=== Taking the Canadian bantamweight championship, June 1937 ===
He faced Canadian featherweight and bantamweight champion Frankie Martin of Montreal for the Canadian bantamweight championship at Maple Leaf Gardens on June 14, 1937. The Torontonian won the national bantamweight title with a split-decision win over Martin.

In a rematch with Angelo Callura, he won by decision before defending his title successfully in a July 1937 rematch against former titleholder Frankie Martin. In the 1937 annual ratings by The Ring, he was ranked as the world's 7th best bantamweight.

When he saved $3,600 in 1937, his first priority was buying his mother a brick house and relocating her from Palmerston, Ontario.

The National Boxing Association ranked him third behind flyweight world champion Harry Jeffra and Sixto Escobar at the beginning of 1938. A hometown crowd of 10,000 turned out for his next bout against Panamanian contender Indian Quintana in Toronto on January 31, 1938. Yack outboxed Quintana and won a split decision after ten rounds. Defeating Quintana brought him one step closer to a potential matchup with the bantamweight champion of the world.

He successfully defended his national title against Spider Armstrong in February 1938.

His first encounter with Johnny Gaudes of St. Boniface came in March 1938 in a non-title fight, where he dropped a points decision. Before a crowd of 11,300 on April 11, 1938, he lost another decision to Johnny Gaudes, the Manitoba boxer's second such victory over him in a three-week span.

At the Mutual Street Arena in May 1938, he faced Small Montana, a former NYSAC world flyweight champion, losing a ten-round decision.

=== Losing the Canadian bantamweight championship, November 1938 ===
On November 7, 1938, he fought Johnny Gaudes for the Canadian bantamweight championship and lost his title on points.

His contract with Mottle Goldman was soon turned over to Willie Morrissey, who took him to New York, where he stayed with Sammy Luftspring, then Canadian welterweight champion, and trained under Whitey Bimstein.

Yack went 3–1 in his New York campaign that took him to the New York Hippodrome, Ridgewood Grove Arena, and Queen's Boulevard Arena. During 1939, his last year in the ring, he competed in 12 bouts, facing 1934 Olympian Lefty Gwynne and former bantamweight world champion Harry Jeffra, among others. After losing to Lou Transparenti in December 1939, Yack retired from the ring.

== Professional boxing record ==
37 fights	23 wins	13 losses
By knockout	4	1
By decision	19	12
Draws	1	

== Life after boxing ==
He retired at 24 to become a physical training instructor in the Canadian Armed Forces but struggled to adjust to life outside the ring. Over six years, he worked various jobs, including as a taxi driver and bookie, and was arrested for bookmaking, assault, and illegal liquor possession.

In summer 1961 near the Town Tavern, Baby Yack intervened after Hamilton mafia boss Johnny Pops Papalia nearly beat bookmaker Maxie Bluestein to death for refusing a drink. He was targeted in multiple assassination attempts over the next two years.

== Death ==
Baby Yack died in Toronto, Ontario, Canada, on January 11, 1987, at age 71, after suffering from Alzheimer's disease for many years.

Achievements
Preceded by Frankie Martin	Canadian Bantamweight Champion; June 8, 1937 – November 7, 1938	Succeeded by Johnny Gaudes
