= Frankie Genaro =

American boxer (1901–1966)

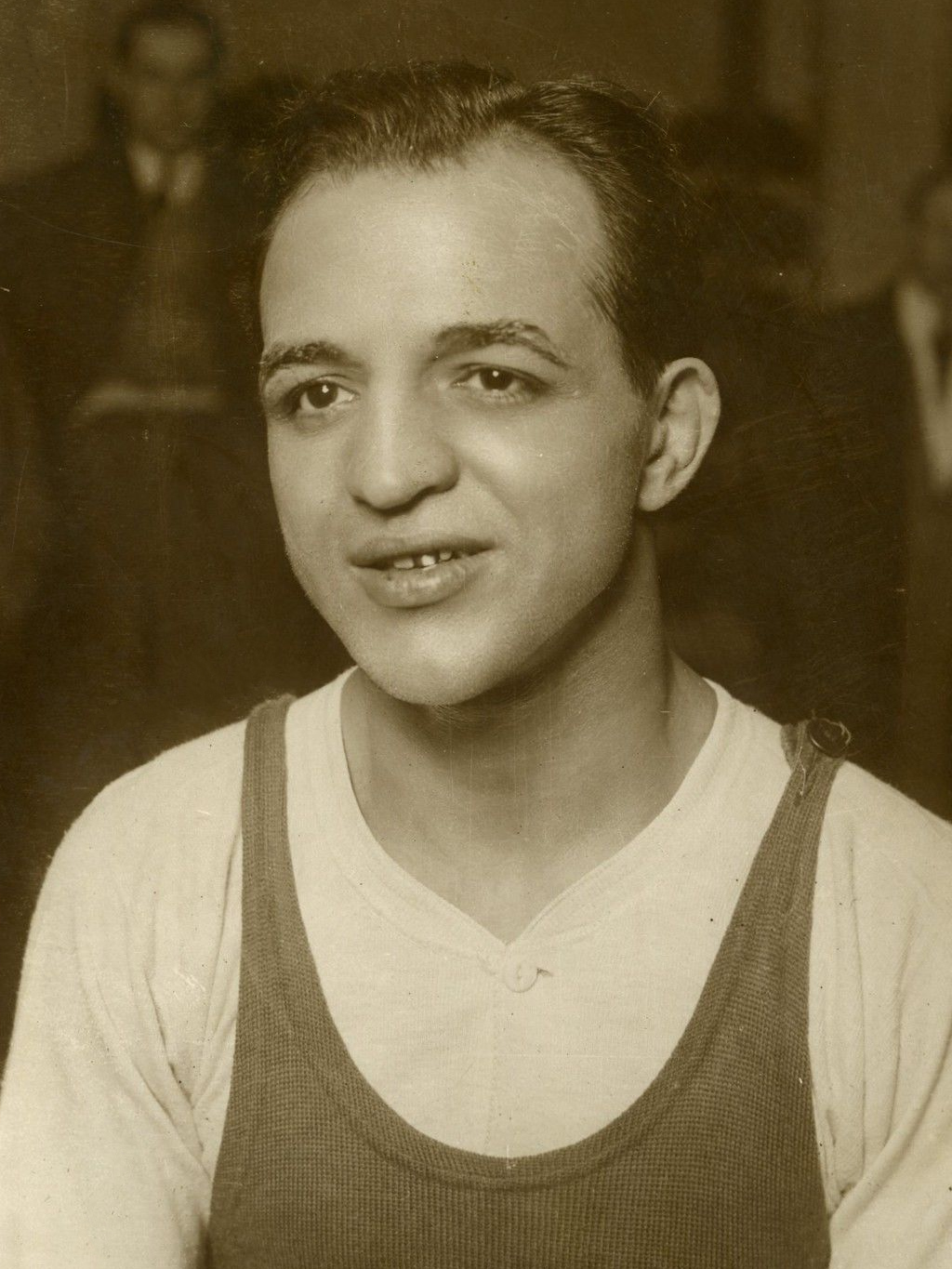
- Genaro in 1931

Personal information
- Born: Frank DiGennaro; August 26, 1901 New York, New York, U.S.
- Died: December 27, 1966 (aged 65) New York, New York, U.S.
- Height: 5 ft 2 in (157 cm)
- Weight: Flyweight

Boxing career
- Stance: Orthodox

Boxing record
- Total fights: 131
- Wins: 98
- Win by KO: 19
- Losses: 23
- Draws: 9
- No contests: 2
Medal record
Representing the United States
Olympic Games
Gold medal – first place	1920 Antwerp	Flyweight

Frank "Frankie" Genaro (born DiGennaro, August 26, 1901 – December 27, 1966) was an American former Olympic gold medalist and a 1928 National Boxing Association (NBA) World flyweight Champion. He is credited with engaging in 130 bouts, recording 96 victories (19 KO's), 26 losses, 8 draws and 4 No Decisions.

Statistical boxing website BoxRec lists Genaro as the #13 ranked flyweight of all time, while The Ring magazine founder Nat Fleischer placed him at #3. The International Boxing Research Organization rates Genaro as the 6th best flyweight ever. He was inducted into The Ring magazine Hall of Fame in 1973 and the International Boxing Hall of Fame in 1998.

== Early life and amateur career ==
Before taking up boxing, Genaro's ambition was to become a jockey, but he took up boxing when he tired of cleaning stables awaiting his chance to race horses. His first amateur bout in 1919 was against Jimmy Nable, which he fought using the ringname A. J. DeVito. He took the New York State and National Flyweight championships early in his amateur career.

Genaro won the flyweight gold medal at the 1920 Olympics in Antwerp on August 24, two days before his 19th birthday.

=== Olympic results ===
- Defeated Einar Nilsen (Norway)
- Defeated Jean Rampignon (France)
- Defeated Charles Albert (France)
- Defeated Anders Pedersen (Denmark)

== Pro career ==
He turned pro that same year and almost immediately was fighting world class flyweights, scoring wins over Charley (Phil) Rosenberg and Pancho Villa. In 1923, he captured the American flyweight title with another win over Villa and decisioned future bantamweight champ Bud Taylor.

=== NBA world flyweight champion ===
Genaro lost his American title to Fidel LaBarba in 1925 and dropped a decision to former world champ Newsboy Brown in his next outing. On October 15, 1928, he defeated Frenchy Belanger in a ten-round points decision to win the NBA flyweight crown at Toronto's Colliseum. He then lost the title in his first defense against Émile Pladner, but regained the title when he defeated Pladner in a rematch one month later.

Genaro successfully defended his title against Ernie Jarvis, Yvon Trevidic and Belanger. He then faced Midget Wolgast, who was recognized as world flyweight champ by the New York State Athletic Commission. The unification bout ended in a draw. Genaro then went on to successfully defend his title against Victor Ferrand, Jackie Harmon and Valentin Angelmann. He lost his crown when he was knocked out by Victor "Young" Perez in 1931.

=== Later career ===
Genaro's title days were over, but he did beat future featherweight champion Joey Archibald in 1933 before retiring in 1934. During his career Genaro fought 10 world champions and three Hall of Famers. He died in Staten Island, New York, on December 27, 1966, at the age of 65.

== Professional boxing record ==
All information in this section is derived from BoxRec, unless otherwise stated.

=== Official record ===
131 fights	80 wins	20 losses
By knockout	19	4
By decision	55	14
By disqualification	6	2
Draws	8	
No contests	1	
Newspaper decisions/draws	22	

All newspaper decisions are officially regarded as “no decision” bouts and are not counted in the win/loss/draw column.

No.	Result	Record	Opponent	Type	Round, time	Date	Location	Notes
131	Loss	80–20–8 (23)	Little Pancho	RTD	8 (10)	Feb 21, 1934	Auditorium, Oakland, California, US	
130	Win	80–19–8 (23)	Young Speedy Dado	RTD	4 (6)	Feb 13, 1934	Forman's Arena, San Jose, California, US	
129	Loss	79–19–8 (23)	Frankie Jarr	PTS	10	Nov 10, 1933	G.E. Club, Fort Wayne, Indiana, US	
128	Loss	79–18–8 (23)	Ernie Maurer	PTS	10	Oct 5, 1933	Ypsilanti, Michigan, US	
127	Win	79–17–8 (23)	Frisco Grande	KO	? (10)	Jul 28, 1933	Columbia Arena, Stanhope, New Jersey, US	
126	Win	78–17–8 (23)	Tommy Lemieux	NWS	6	Jun 9, 1933	Prospect Park, Biddeford, Maine, US	
125	Win	78–17–8 (22)	Joey Archibald	PTS	10	Apr 5, 1933	Casino, Fall River, Massachusetts, US	
124	Win	77–17–8 (22)	Ruby Bradley	PTS	10	Mar 15, 1933	Casino, Fall River, Massachusetts, US	
123	Win	76–17–8 (22)	Jose Fino	PTS	8	Jan 24, 1933	Portner's Arena, Alexandria, Virginia, US	
122	Loss	75–17–8 (22)	Young Tommy	TKO	3 (10), 1:22	Mar 29, 1932	Olympic Auditorium, Los Angeles, California, US	
121	Loss	75–16–8 (22)	Mariano Arilla	DQ	7 (10)	Nov 16, 1931	Palais des Sports, Paris, France	Genaro DQ'd after repeated head butts
120	Loss	75–15–8 (22)	Victor Perez	KO	2 (15)	Oct 26, 1931	Palais des Sports, Paris, France	Lost NBA and IBU flyweight titles
119	Win	75–14–8 (22)	Valentin Angelmann	PTS	15	Oct 3, 1931	Palais des Sports, Paris, France	Retained NBA and IBU flyweight titles
118	Win	74–14–8 (22)	Jackie Harmon	KO	6 (15), 1:30	Jul 30, 1931	Lakewood Arena, Waterbury, Connecticut, US	Retained NBA and IBU flyweight titles
117	Win	73–14–8 (22)	Routier Parra	KO	4 (10)	Jul 16, 1931	Meadowbrook Arena, North Adams, Massachusetts, US	Retained NBA and IBU flyweight titles
116	Draw	72–14–8 (22)	Victor Ferrand	PTS	15	Mar 25, 1931	Plaza de Toros Monumental, Barcelona, Spain	Retained NBA and IBU flyweight titles
115	Draw	72–14–7 (22)	Midget Wolgast	SD	15	Dec 26, 1930	Madison Square Garden, New York City, New York, US	Retained NBA flyweight title; For NYSAC flyweight title
114	Win	72–14–6 (22)	Jose De Cruz	KO	3 (8)	Dec 15, 1930	Waltz Dream Arena, Atlantic City, New Jersey, US	
113	Loss	71–14–6 (22)	Ruby Bradley	PTS	10	Dec 12, 1930	Valley Arena, Holyoke, Massachusetts, US	
112	Win	71–13–6 (22)	Willie LaMorte	PTS	10	Aug 6, 1930	Dreamland Park, Newark, New Jersey, US	
111	Win	70–13–6 (22)	Davey Adelman	PTS	10	Jul 28, 1930	Dexter Park Arena, Woodhaven, New York City, New York, US	
110	Win	69–13–6 (22)	Little Jeff Smith	KO	2 (10)	Jun 24, 1930	Hurley Stadium, East Hartford, Connecticut, US	
109	Win	68–13–6 (22)	Frenchy Belanger	UD	10	Jun 10, 1930	Coliseum, Toronto, Ontario, Canada	Retained NBA and IBU flyweight titles
108	Win	67–13–6 (22)	Frisco Grande	TKO	4 (10)	May 16, 1930	Convention Hall, Camden, New Jersey, US	
107	Win	66–13–6 (22)	Andre Gleizes	KO	3 (10)	Apr 8, 1930	Teatro Politeama, Napoli, Italy	
106	Win	65–13–6 (22)	Orlando Magliozzi	DQ	3 (10)	Feb 23, 1930	Palazzo dello Sport (Pad. 3 Fiera), Milan, Italy	
105	Win	64–13–6 (22)	Arthur Boddington	TKO	4 (10)	Feb 15, 1930	Torino, Italy	
104	ND	63–13–6 (22)	Harry Stein	ND	8 (10)	Feb 6, 1930	Sportpalast, Schoeneberg, Germany	
103	Win	63–13–6 (21)	Yvon Trèvédic	TKO	12 (15)	Jan 18, 1930	Velodrome d'Hiver, Paris, France	Retained NBA and IBU flyweight titles
102	Win	62–13–6 (21)	Ernie Jarvis	PTS	15	Oct 17, 1929	Royal Albert Hall, Kensington, London, England	Retained NBA and IBU flyweight titles
101	Win	61–13–6 (21)	Jackie Sharkey	NWS	10	Sep 9, 1929	Auditorium, Minneapolis, Minnesota, US	
100	Loss	61–13–6 (20)	Willie Davies	UD	10	Aug 5, 1929	Meyers Bowl, North Braddock, Pennsylvania, US	
99	Win	61–12–6 (20)	Émile Pladner	DQ	5 (15)	Apr 18, 1929	Velodrome d'Hiver, Paris, France	Won NBA and IBU flyweight titles; Pladner DQ'd for a low left to the body that put Genaro down
98	Loss	60–12–6 (20)	Émile Pladner	KO	1 (15), 0:58	Mar 2, 1929	Velodrome d'Hiver, Paris, France	Lost NBA flyweight title; For IBU flyweight title
97	Loss	60–11–6 (20)	Tommy Paul	UD	6	Jan 18, 1929	Broadway Auditorium, Buffalo, New York, US	
96	Win	60–10–6 (20)	Steve Rocco	DQ	2 (10)	Dec 14, 1928	Olympia Stadium, Detroit, Michigan, US	Retained NBA flyweight title
95	Loss	59–10–6 (20)	Art Giroux	NWS	12	Nov 27, 1928	Portland, Maine, US	Not to be confused with Art Giroux
94	Win	59–10–6 (19)	Frenchy Belanger	PTS	10	Oct 15, 1928	Coliseum, Toronto, Ontario, Canada	Retained NBA flyweight title
93	Win	58–10–6 (19)	Ernie Peters	PTS	10	Aug 21, 1928	Hippodrome, Chicago, Illinois, US	
92	Draw	57–10–6 (19)	Steve Rocco	PTS	10	Jul 23, 1928	Coliseum, Toronto, Ontario, Canada	Retained NBA flyweight title
91	Win	57–10–5 (19)	Lew Goldberg	KO	3 (10)	Jun 18, 1928	American Legion, West Springfield, Massachusetts, US	
90	Win	56–10–5 (19)	Johnny Vacca	PTS	10	Apr 9, 1928	Arena, Boston, Massachusetts, US	
89	Loss	55–10–5 (19)	Jackie Johnston	SD	10	Mar 30, 1928	Coliseum, Toronto, Ontario, Canada	
88	Win	55–9–5 (19)	Frisco Grande	PTS	10	Mar 9, 1928	Broadway Auditorium, Buffalo, New York, US	
87	Win	54–9–5 (19)	Duke Menard	NWS	12	Mar 6, 1928	Exposition Building, Portland, Oregon, US	
86	Win	54–9–5 (18)	Frenchy Belanger	PTS	10	Feb 6, 1928	Coliseum, Toronto, Ontario, Canada	Won NBA flyweight title
85	Win	53–9–5 (18)	Willie LaMorte	NWS	10	Dec 20, 1927	Laurel Garden, Newark, New Jersey, US	
84	Loss	53–9–5 (17)	Frenchy Belanger	SD	10	Nov 28, 1927	Coliseum, Toronto, Ontario, Canada	
83	Loss	53–8–5 (17)	Billy Kelly	PTS	10	Oct 28, 1927	Watres Armory, Scranton, Pennsylvania, US	
82	Win	53–7–5 (17)	Marty Gold	NWS	10	Oct 7, 1927	Raleigh, North Carolina, US	
81	Loss	53–7–5 (16)	Joey Eulo	NWS	10	Sep 16, 1927	Harrison, New Jersey, US	
80	Win	53–7–5 (15)	Eddie Flank	PTS	10	Sep 12, 1927	St. Nicholas Arena, New York City, New York, US	
79	Win	52–7–5 (15)	Tommy Hughes	NWS	10	Sep 2, 1927	Armory, Akron, Ohio, US	
78	Win	52–7–5 (14)	Frankie Garcia	KO	2 (?)	Aug 23, 1927	Utica Stadium, Utica, New York, US	
77	Win	51–7–5 (14)	Joey Ross	PTS	10	Jul 22, 1927	American Legion, West Springfield, Massachusetts, US	
76	Loss	50–7–5 (14)	Dick O'Leary	DQ	6 (10), 1:20	May 5, 1927	South Main Street Armory, Wilkes-Barre, Pennsylvania, US	Genaro was DQ'd for a low blow
75	Draw	50–6–5 (14)	Willie LaMorte	PTS	10	Mar 21, 1927	White City Arena, Chicago, Illinois, US	
74	Win	50–6–4 (14)	Tommy Hughes	PTS	8	Mar 9, 1927	Public Hall, Cleveland, Ohio, US	
73	Win	49–6–4 (14)	Ruby Bradley	PTS	10	Mar 5, 1927	Walker A.C., New York City, New York, US	
72	Win	48–6–4 (14)	Joey Scalfaro	PTS	10	Feb 16, 1927	Manhattan Casino, New York City, New York, US	
71	Loss	47–6–4 (14)	Newsboy Brown	PTS	10	Jan 21, 1927	Madison Square Garden, New York City, New York, US	
70	Win	47–5–4 (14)	Ruby Bradley	PTS	12	Oct 13, 1926	Rhode Island Auditorium, Providence, Rhode Island, US	
69	Win	46–5–4 (14)	Mickey Lewis	NWS	10	Oct 7, 1926	West New York, New Jersey, US	
68	Draw	46–5–4 (13)	Willie Darcy	PTS	12	Jul 22, 1926	Chadwick Park, Albany, New York, US	
67	Win	46–5–3 (13)	Joe McKean	KO	10 (12), 0:55	Jul 8, 1926	Chadwick Park, Albany, New York, US	
66	Win	45–5–3 (13)	Joe McKean	PTS	10	Jun 11, 1926	Steeplechase A.A., New York City, New York, US	
65	Loss	44–5–3 (13)	Bushy Graham	PTS	10	May 17, 1926	Madison Square Garden, New York City, New York, US	
64	Win	44–4–3 (13)	Willie Darcy	NWS	10	Apr 19, 1926	Bayonne, Louisiana, US	
63	Win	44–4–3 (12)	Hilly Levine	NWS	10	Apr 5, 1926	Casino, Bayonne, Louisiana, US	
62	Win	44–4–3 (11)	Victor St. Onge	TKO	4 (12)	Nov 16, 1925	Broadway Auditorium, Buffalo, New York, US	
61	Loss	43–4–3 (11)	Newsboy Brown	PTS	10	Oct 14, 1925	Olympic Auditorium, Los Angeles, California, US	
60	Loss	43–3–3 (11)	Fidel LaBarba	PTS	10	Aug 22, 1925	Ascot Park, Los Angeles, California, US	Lost American flyweight title; For vacant NBA flyweight title
59	Draw	43–2–3 (11)	George Marks	NWS	10	Aug 7, 1925	Armory, Red Bank, New Jersey, US	
58	Win	43–2–3 (10)	Hilly Levine	DQ	11 (12)	Jul 31, 1925	Arena, Rockaway Beach, New York City, New York, US	Levine was DQ'd for hitting low
57	Win	42–2–3 (10)	Kid Williams	PTS	12	Jun 26, 1925	Carlin's Park, Baltimore, Maryland, US	
56	Win	41–2–3 (10)	George Marks	PTS	10	Jun 16, 1925	Coney Island Stadium, New York City, New York, US	
55	Win	40–2–3 (10)	Harold Smith	PTS	10	May 28, 1925	Dexter Park Arena, Woodhaven, New York City, New York, US	
54	Win	39–2–3 (10)	Al Dundee	NWS	12	Apr 13, 1925	Coliseum, Mansfield, Ohio, US	
53	Win	39–2–3 (9)	Joe Lucas	PTS	10	Mar 20, 1925	Detroit, Michigan, US	
52	Win	38–2–3 (9)	Eddie O'Dowd	NWS	12	Feb 26, 1925	Rayen-Wood Auditorium, Youngstown, Ohio, US	
51	Win	38–2–3 (8)	Henry 'Kid' Wolfe	PTS	10	Feb 16, 1925	Arena, Philadelphia, Pennsylvania, US	
50	Win	37–2–3 (8)	Eddie O'Dowd	PTS	15	Oct 6, 1924	Heinemann Park, New Orleans, Louisiana, US	
49	Win	36–2–3 (8)	Bushy Graham	PTS	12	Sep 23, 1924	Henderson's Bowl, New York City, New York, US	
48	Win	35–2–3 (8)	Hilly Levine	PTS	12	Aug 22, 1924	Steeplechase A.A., New York City, New York, US	
47	Win	34–2–3 (8)	Johnny Curtin	PTS	12	Aug 5, 1924	Henderson's Bowl, New York City, New York, US	
46	Draw	33–2–3 (8)	Bushy Graham	PTS	10	Jul 7, 1924	Baseball Park, Rochester, New York, US	
45	Win	33–2–2 (8)	Joe Clifford	PTS	12	Jun 12, 1924	Sportland Heights Arena, Berwyn, Maryland, US	
44	Draw	32–2–2 (8)	Howard Mayberry	MD	10	May 22, 1924	Arena Gardens, Toronto, Ontario, Canada	
43	Win	32–2–1 (8)	Johnny Sheppard	PTS	10	Jan 22, 1924	Mechanics Building, Boston, Massachusetts, US	
42	Win	31–2–1 (8)	Joe Clifford	NWS	10	Dec 18, 1923	Detroit, Michigan, US	
41	Win	31–2–1 (7)	Carl Tremaine	SD	12	Nov 29, 1923	Madison Square Garden, New York City, New York, US	
40	Win	30–2–1 (7)	Vincent Salvatore	PTS	12	Sep 29, 1923	Commonwealth Sporting Club, New York City, New York, US	Retained American flyweight title
39	Win	29–2–1 (7)	Bobby Wolgast	PTS	10	Aug 28, 1923	Mechanics Building, Boston, Massachusetts, US	
38	Win	28–2–1 (7)	Buddy Wallace	TKO	4 (6)	Jul 30, 1923	Columbus, Ohio, US	
37	Win	27–2–1 (7)	Frankie Daly	PTS	12	Jul 27, 1923	Nutmeg Stadium, New Haven, Connecticut, US	
36	Win	26–2–1 (7)	Bob Gershane	KO	3 (15), 0:48	Jul 19, 1923	Kingsboro Stadium, New York City, New York, US	
35	Win	25–2–1 (7)	Tony Norman	NWS	10	Jul 7, 1923	Forbes Field, Pittsburgh, Pennsylvania, US	
34	Win	25–2–1 (6)	Memphis Pal Moore	DQ	6 (10)	Apr 23, 1923	Coliseum, Chicago, Illinois, US	Accidental low blow
33	Loss	24–2–1 (6)	Bobby Wolgast	NWS	8	Apr 16, 1923	Arena, Philadelphia, Pennsylvania, US	
32	Win	24–2–1 (5)	Charles 'Bud' Taylor	NWS	10	Apr 4, 1923	Coliseum, Chicago, Illinois, US	
31	Win	24–2–1 (4)	Bobby Doyle	PTS	4	Mar 28, 1923	Rink S.C., New York City, New York, US	
30	Win	23–2–1 (4)	Frankie Williams	KO	3 (10)	Mar 6, 1923	Chestnut Street Auditorium, Harrisburg, Pennsylvania, US	
29	Win	22–2–1 (4)	Pancho Villa	SD	15	Mar 1, 1923	Madison Square Garden, New York City, New York, US	Won American flyweight title
28	Win	21–2–1 (4)	Tommy Shea	KO	4 (8)	Feb 12, 1923	Chestnut Street Auditorium, Harrisburg, Pennsylvania, US	
27	Win	20–2–1 (4)	Terry Martin	PTS	10	Dec 15, 1922	Mechanics Building, Boston, Massachusetts, US	
26	Win	19–2–1 (4)	Charley Phil Rosenberg	PTS	12	Oct 21, 1922	Commonwealth Sporting Club, New York City, New York, US	
25	Win	18–2–1 (4)	George Russell	TKO	14 (15)	Oct 5, 1922	Clermont Avenue Rink, New York City, New York, US	
24	Win	17–2–1 (4)	Pancho Villa	PTS	10	Aug 22, 1922	Ebbets Field, New York City, New York, US	
23	Loss	16–2–1 (4)	Battling Harry Leonard	PTS	12	Aug 19, 1922	Commonwealth Sporting Club, New York City, New York, US	
22	Win	16–1–1 (4)	Battling Al Murray	NWS	12	Jul 21, 1922	Ocean Park Casino, Long Branch, New Jersey, US	
21	Win	16–1–1 (3)	Pancho Villa	NWS	12	Jul 6, 1922	Oakland A.A., Jersey City, New Jersey, US	
20	Win	16–1–1 (2)	Eddie Lynch	NWS	12	Jun 9, 1922	Bayonne A.A., Bayonne, New Jersey, US	
19	Win	16–1–1 (1)	Charley Phil Rosenberg	PTS	12	May 23, 1922	Commonwealth Sporting Club, New York City, New York, US	
18	Loss	15–1–1 (1)	Abe Goldstein	PTS	4	May 19, 1922	Madison Square Garden, New York City, New York, US	
17	Win	15–0–1 (1)	Manny Wexler	PTS	12	Apr 18, 1922	Star S.C., New York City, New York, US	
16	Win	14–0–1 (1)	Sammy Cohen	PTS	12	Mar 25, 1922	Commonwealth Sporting Club, New York City, New York, US	
15	Win	13–0–1 (1)	Jack Sayles	PTS	12	Mar 14, 1922	Pioneer Sporting Club, New York City, New York, US	
14	Win	12–0–1 (1)	Leo Reynolds	PTS	10	Jan 10, 1922	Pioneer Sporting Club, New York City, New York, US	
13	Win	11–0–1 (1)	Henry 'Kid' Wolfe	NWS	8	Dec 26, 1921	National A.C., Philadelphia, Pennsylvania, US	
12	Win	11–0–1	Johnny Rosner	PTS	10	Dec 19, 1921	Lexington Avenue Theatre, New York City, New York, US	
11	Win	10–0–1	Andy Davis	UD	10	Dec 13, 1921	Pioneer Sporting Club, New York City, New York, US	
10	Win	9–0–1	Joey Leon	PTS	12	Nov 7, 1921	Star S.C., New York City, New York, US	
9	Win	8–0–1	Joe Colletti	PTS	12	Aug 12, 1921	Convention Hall, Saratoga Springs, New York, US	
8	Win	7–0–1	Bobby Doyle	PTS	15	May 21, 1921	9th Coast Defense Armory, New York City, New York, US	
7	Win	6–0–1	Jockey Joe Dillon	PTS	15	Apr 26, 1921	Hunts Point Palace, New York City, New York, US	
6	Win	5–0–1	Joe Colletti	PTS	10	Apr 9, 1921	Broadway Arena, New York City, New York, US	
5	Draw	4–0–1	Joe Colletti	PTS	12	Feb 16, 1921	Columbus Institute, Poughkeepsie, New York, US	
4	Win	4–0	Johnny Rosner	PTS	12	Dec 13, 1920	Star S.C., New York City, New York, US	
3	Win	3–0	Jimmy Peterson	PTS	10	Nov 3, 1920	Star S.C., New York City, New York, US	
2	Win	2–0	Billy Murphy	PTS	6	Oct 20, 1920	Star S.C., New York City, New York, US	
1	Win	1–0	Joe Colletti	DQ	3 (6)	Oct 15, 1920	Madison Square Garden, New York City, New York, US	Colletti DQ'd for low blow

=== Unofficial record ===
131 fights	98 wins	23 losses
By knockout	19	4
By decision	73	17
By disqualification	6	2
Draws	9	
No contests	1	

Record with the inclusion of newspaper decisions in the win/loss/draw column.

No.	Result	Record	Opponent	Type	Round	Date	Location	Notes
131	Loss	98–23–9 (1)	Little Pancho	RTD	8 (10)	Feb 21, 1934	Auditorium, Oakland, California, US	
130	Win	98–22–9 (1)	Young Speedy Dado	RTD	4 (6)	Feb 13, 1934	Forman's Arena, San Jose, California, US	
129	Loss	97–22–9 (1)	Frankie Jarr	PTS	10	Nov 10, 1933	G.E. Club, Fort Wayne, Indiana, US	
128	Loss	97–21–9 (1)	Ernie Maurer	PTS	10	Oct 5, 1933	Ypsilanti, Michigan, US	
127	Win	97–20–9 (1)	Frisco Grande	KO	? (10)	Jul 28, 1933	Columbia Arena, Stanhope, New Jersey, US	
126	Win	96–20–9 (1)	Tommy Lemieux	NWS	6	Jun 9, 1933	Prospect Park, Biddeford, Maine, US	
125	Win	95–20–9 (1)	Joey Archibald	PTS	10	Apr 5, 1933	Casino, Fall River, Massachusetts, US	
124	Win	94–20–9 (1)	Ruby Bradley	PTS	10	Mar 15, 1933	Casino, Fall River, Massachusetts, US	
123	Win	93–20–9 (1)	Jose Fino	PTS	8	Jan 24, 1933	Portner's Arena, Alexandria, Virginia, US	
122	Loss	92–20–9 (1)	Young Tommy	TKO	3 (10), 1:22	Mar 29, 1932	Olympic Auditorium, Los Angeles, California, US	
121	Loss	92–19–9 (1)	Mariano Arilla	DQ	7 (10)	Nov 16, 1931	Palais des Sports, Paris, France	Genaro DQ'd after repeated head butts
120	Loss	92–18–9 (1)	Victor Perez	KO	2 (15)	Oct 26, 1931	Palais des Sports, Paris, France	Lost NBA and IBU flyweight titles
119	Win	92–17–9 (1)	Valentin Angelmann	PTS	15	Oct 3, 1931	Palais des Sports, Paris, France	Retained NBA and IBU flyweight titles
118	Win	91–17–9 (1)	Jackie Harmon	KO	6 (15), 1:30	Jul 30, 1931	Lakewood Arena, Waterbury, Connecticut, US	Retained NBA and IBU flyweight titles
117	Win	90–17–9 (1)	Routier Parra	KO	4 (10)	Jul 16, 1931	Meadowbrook Arena, North Adams, Massachusetts, US	Retained NBA and IBU flyweight titles
116	Draw	89–17–9 (1)	Victor Ferrand	PTS	15	Mar 25, 1931	Plaza de Toros Monumental, Barcelona, Spain	Retained NBA and IBU flyweight titles
115	Draw	89–17–8 (1)	Midget Wolgast	SD	15	Dec 26, 1930	Madison Square Garden, New York City, New York, US	Retained NBA flyweight title; For NYSAC flyweight title
114	Win	89–17–7 (1)	Jose De Cruz	KO	3 (8)	Dec 15, 1930	Waltz Dream Arena, Atlantic City, New Jersey, US	
113	Loss	88–17–7 (1)	Ruby Bradley	PTS	10	Dec 12, 1930	Valley Arena, Holyoke, Massachusetts, US	
112	Win	88–16–7 (1)	Willie LaMorte	PTS	10	Aug 6, 1930	Dreamland Park, Newark, New Jersey, US	
111	Win	87–16–7 (1)	Davey Adelman	PTS	10	Jul 28, 1930	Dexter Park Arena, Woodhaven, New York City, New York, US	
110	Win	86–16–7 (1)	Little Jeff Smith	KO	2 (10)	Jun 24, 1930	Hurley Stadium, East Hartford, Connecticut, US	
109	Win	85–16–7 (1)	Frenchy Belanger	UD	10	Jun 10, 1930	Coliseum, Toronto, Ontario, Canada	Retained NBA and IBU flyweight titles
108	Win	84–16–7 (1)	Frisco Grande	TKO	4 (10)	May 16, 1930	Convention Hall, Camden, New Jersey, US	
107	Win	83–16–7 (1)	Andre Gleizes	KO	3 (10)	Apr 8, 1930	Teatro Politeama, Napoli, Italy	
106	Win	82–16–7 (1)	Orlando Magliozzi	DQ	3 (10)	Feb 23, 1930	Palazzo dello Sport (Pad. 3 Fiera), Milan, Italy	
105	Win	81–16–7 (1)	Arthur Boddington	TKO	4 (10)	Feb 15, 1930	Torino, Italy	
104	ND	80–16–7 (1)	Harry Stein	ND	8 (10)	Feb 6, 1930	Sportpalast, Schoeneberg, Germany	
103	Win	80–16–7	Yvon Trèvédic	TKO	12 (15)	Jan 18, 1930	Velodrome d'Hiver, Paris, France	Retained NBA and IBU flyweight titles
102	Win	79–16–7	Ernie Jarvis	PTS	15	Oct 17, 1929	Royal Albert Hall, Kensington, London, England	Retained NBA and IBU flyweight titles
101	Win	78–16–7	Jackie Sharkey	NWS	10	Sep 9, 1929	Auditorium, Minneapolis, Minnesota, US	
100	Loss	77–16–7	Willie Davies	UD	10	Aug 5, 1929	Meyers Bowl, North Braddock, Pennsylvania, US	
99	Win	77–15–7	Émile Pladner	DQ	5 (15)	Apr 18, 1929	Velodrome d'Hiver, Paris, France	Won NBA and IBU flyweight titles; Pladner DQ'd for a low left to the body that put Genaro down
98	Loss	76–15–7	Émile Pladner	KO	1 (15), 0:58	Mar 2, 1929	Velodrome d'Hiver, Paris, France	Lost NBA flyweight title; For IBU flyweight title
97	Loss	76–14–7	Tommy Paul	UD	6	Jan 18, 1929	Broadway Auditorium, Buffalo, New York, US	
96	Win	76–13–7	Steve Rocco	DQ	2 (10)	Dec 14, 1928	Olympia Stadium, Detroit, Michigan, US	Retained NBA flyweight title
95	Loss	75–13–7	Art Giroux	NWS	12	Nov 27, 1928	Portland, Maine, US	Not to be confused with Art Giroux
94	Win	75–12–7	Frenchy Belanger	PTS	10	Oct 15, 1928	Coliseum, Toronto, Ontario, Canada	Retained NBA flyweight title
93	Win	74–12–7	Ernie Peters	PTS	10	Aug 21, 1928	Hippodrome, Chicago, Illinois, US	
92	Draw	73–12–7	Steve Rocco	PTS	10	Jul 23, 1928	Coliseum, Toronto, Ontario, Canada	Retained NBA flyweight title
91	Win	73–12–6	Lew Goldberg	KO	3 (10)	Jun 18, 1928	American Legion, West Springfield, Massachusetts, US	
90	Win	72–12–6	Johnny Vacca	PTS	10	Apr 9, 1928	Arena, Boston, Massachusetts, US	
89	Loss	71–12–6	Jackie Johnston	SD	10	Mar 30, 1928	Coliseum, Toronto, Ontario, Canada	
88	Win	71–11–6	Frisco Grande	PTS	10	Mar 9, 1928	Broadway Auditorium, Buffalo, New York, US	
87	Win	70–11–6	Duke Menard	NWS	12	Mar 6, 1928	Exposition Building, Portland, Oregon, US	
86	Win	69–11–6	Frenchy Belanger	PTS	10	Feb 6, 1928	Coliseum, Toronto, Ontario, Canada	Won NBA flyweight title
85	Win	68–11–6	Willie LaMorte	NWS	10	Dec 20, 1927	Laurel Garden, Newark, New Jersey, US	
84	Loss	67–11–6	Frenchy Belanger	SD	10	Nov 28, 1927	Coliseum, Toronto, Ontario, Canada	
83	Loss	67–10–6	Billy Kelly	PTS	10	Oct 28, 1927	Watres Armory, Scranton, Pennsylvania, US	
82	Win	67–9–6	Marty Gold	NWS	10	Oct 7, 1927	Raleigh, North Carolina, US	
81	Loss	66–9–6	Joey Eulo	NWS	10	Sep 16, 1927	Harrison, New Jersey, US	
80	Win	66–8–6	Eddie Flank	PTS	10	Sep 12, 1927	St. Nicholas Arena, New York City, New York, US	
79	Win	65–8–6	Tommy Hughes	NWS	10	Sep 2, 1927	Armory, Akron, Ohio, US	
78	Win	64–8–6	Frankie Garcia	KO	2 (?)	Aug 23, 1927	Utica Stadium, Utica, New York, US	
77	Win	63–8–6	Joey Ross	PTS	10	Jul 22, 1927	American Legion, West Springfield, Massachusetts, US	
76	Loss	62–8–6	Dick O'Leary	DQ	6 (10), 1:20	May 5, 1927	South Main Street Armory, Wilkes-Barre, Pennsylvania, US	Genaro was DQ'd for a low blow
75	Draw	62–7–6	Willie LaMorte	PTS	10	Mar 21, 1927	White City Arena, Chicago, Illinois, US	
74	Win	62–7–5	Tommy Hughes	PTS	8	Mar 9, 1927	Public Hall, Cleveland, Ohio, US	
73	Win	61–7–5	Ruby Bradley	PTS	10	Mar 5, 1927	Walker A.C., New York City, New York, US	
72	Win	60–7–5	Joey Scalfaro	PTS	10	Feb 16, 1927	Manhattan Casino, New York City, New York, US	
71	Loss	59–7–5	Newsboy Brown	PTS	10	Jan 21, 1927	Madison Square Garden, New York City, New York, US	
70	Win	59–6–5	Ruby Bradley	PTS	12	Oct 13, 1926	Rhode Island Auditorium, Providence, Rhode Island, US	
69	Win	58–6–5	Mickey Lewis	NWS	10	Oct 7, 1926	West New York, New Jersey, US	
68	Draw	57–6–5	Willie Darcy	PTS	12	Jul 22, 1926	Chadwick Park, Albany, New York, US	
67	Win	57–6–4	Joe McKean	KO	10 (12), 0:55	Jul 8, 1926	Chadwick Park, Albany, New York, US	
66	Win	56–6–4	Joe McKean	PTS	10	Jun 11, 1926	Steeplechase A.A., New York City, New York, US	
65	Loss	55–6–4	Bushy Graham	PTS	10	May 17, 1926	Madison Square Garden, New York City, New York, US	
64	Win	55–5–4	Willie Darcy	NWS	10	Apr 19, 1926	Bayonne, Louisiana, US	
63	Win	54–5–4	Hilly Levine	NWS	10	Apr 5, 1926	Casino, Bayonne, Louisiana, US	
62	Win	53–5–4	Victor St. Onge	TKO	4 (12)	Nov 16, 1925	Broadway Auditorium, Buffalo, New York, US	
61	Loss	52–5–4	Newsboy Brown	PTS	10	Oct 14, 1925	Olympic Auditorium, Los Angeles, California, US	
60	Loss	52–4–4	Fidel LaBarba	PTS	10	Aug 22, 1925	Ascot Park, Los Angeles, California, US	Lost American flyweight title; For vacant NBA flyweight title
59	Draw	52–3–4	George Marks	NWS	10	Aug 7, 1925	Armory, Red Bank, New Jersey, US	
58	Win	52–3–3	Hilly Levine	DQ	11 (12)	Jul 31, 1925	Arena, Rockaway Beach, New York City, New York, US	Levine was DQ'd for hitting low
57	Win	51–3–3	Kid Williams	PTS	12	Jun 26, 1925	Carlin's Park, Baltimore, Maryland, US	
56	Win	50–3–3	George Marks	PTS	10	Jun 16, 1925	Coney Island Stadium, New York City, New York, US	
55	Win	49–3–3	Harold Smith	PTS	10	May 28, 1925	Dexter Park Arena, Woodhaven, New York City, New York, US	
54	Win	48–3–3	Al Dundee	NWS	12	Apr 13, 1925	Coliseum, Mansfield, Ohio, US	
53	Win	47–3–3	Joe Lucas	PTS	10	Mar 20, 1925	Detroit, Michigan, US	
52	Win	46–3–3	Eddie O'Dowd	NWS	12	Feb 26, 1925	Rayen-Wood Auditorium, Youngstown, Ohio, US	
51	Win	45–3–3	Henry 'Kid' Wolfe	PTS	10	Feb 16, 1925	Arena, Philadelphia, Pennsylvania, US	
50	Win	44–3–3	Eddie O'Dowd	PTS	15	Oct 6, 1924	Heinemann Park, New Orleans, Louisiana, US	
49	Win	43–3–3	Bushy Graham	PTS	12	Sep 23, 1924	Henderson's Bowl, New York City, New York, US	
48	Win	42–3–3	Hilly Levine	PTS	12	Aug 22, 1924	Steeplechase A.A., New York City, New York, US	
47	Win	41–3–3	Johnny Curtin	PTS	12	Aug 5, 1924	Henderson's Bowl, New York City, New York, US	
46	Draw	40–3–3	Bushy Graham	PTS	10	Jul 7, 1924	Baseball Park, Rochester, New York, US	
45	Win	40–3–2	Joe Clifford	PTS	12	Jun 12, 1924	Sportland Heights Arena, Berwyn, Maryland, US	
44	Draw	39–3–2	Howard Mayberry	MD	10	May 22, 1924	Arena Gardens, Toronto, Ontario, Canada	
43	Win	39–3–1	Johnny Sheppard	PTS	10	Jan 22, 1924	Mechanics Building, Boston, Massachusetts, US	
42	Win	38–3–1	Joe Clifford	NWS	10	Dec 18, 1923	Detroit, Michigan, US	
41	Win	37–3–1	Carl Tremaine	SD	12	Nov 29, 1923	Madison Square Garden, New York City, New York, US	
40	Win	36–3–1	Vincent Salvatore	PTS	12	Sep 29, 1923	Commonwealth Sporting Club, New York City, New York, US	Retained American flyweight title
39	Win	35–3–1	Bobby Wolgast	PTS	10	Aug 28, 1923	Mechanics Building, Boston, Massachusetts, US	
38	Win	34–3–1	Buddy Wallace	TKO	4 (6)	Jul 30, 1923	Columbus, Ohio, US	
37	Win	33–3–1	Frankie Daly	PTS	12	Jul 27, 1923	Nutmeg Stadium, New Haven, Connecticut, US	
36	Win	32–3–1	Bob Gershane	KO	3 (15), 0:48	Jul 19, 1923	Kingsboro Stadium, New York City, New York, US	
35	Win	31–3–1	Tony Norman	NWS	10	Jul 7, 1923	Forbes Field, Pittsburgh, Pennsylvania, US	
34	Win	30–3–1	Memphis Pal Moore	DQ	6 (10)	Apr 23, 1923	Coliseum, Chicago, Illinois, US	Accidental low blow
33	Loss	29–3–1	Bobby Wolgast	NWS	8	Apr 16, 1923	Arena, Philadelphia, Pennsylvania, US	
32	Win	29–2–1	Charles 'Bud' Taylor	NWS	10	Apr 4, 1923	Coliseum, Chicago, Illinois, US	
31	Win	28–2–1	Bobby Doyle	PTS	4	Mar 28, 1923	Rink S.C., New York City, New York, US	
30	Win	27–2–1	Frankie Williams	KO	3 (10)	Mar 6, 1923	Chestnut Street Auditorium, Harrisburg, Pennsylvania, US	
29	Win	26–2–1	Pancho Villa	SD	15	Mar 1, 1923	Madison Square Garden, New York City, New York, US	Won American flyweight title
28	Win	25–2–1	Tommy Shea	KO	4 (8)	Feb 12, 1923	Chestnut Street Auditorium, Harrisburg, Pennsylvania, US	
27	Win	24–2–1	Terry Martin	PTS	10	Dec 15, 1922	Mechanics Building, Boston, Massachusetts, US	
26	Win	23–2–1	Charley Phil Rosenberg	PTS	12	Oct 21, 1922	Commonwealth Sporting Club, New York City, New York, US	
25	Win	22–2–1	George Russell	TKO	14 (15)	Oct 5, 1922	Clermont Avenue Rink, New York City, New York, US	
24	Win	21–2–1	Pancho Villa	PTS	10	Aug 22, 1922	Ebbets Field, New York City, New York, US	
23	Loss	20–2–1	Battling Harry Leonard	PTS	12	Aug 19, 1922	Commonwealth Sporting Club, New York City, New York, US	
22	Win	20–1–1	Battling Al Murray	NWS	12	Jul 21, 1922	Ocean Park Casino, Long Branch, New Jersey, US	
21	Win	19–1–1	Pancho Villa	NWS	12	Jul 6, 1922	Oakland A.A., Jersey City, New Jersey, US	
20	Win	18–1–1	Eddie Lynch	NWS	12	Jun 9, 1922	Bayonne A.A., Bayonne, New Jersey, US	
19	Win	17–1–1	Charley Phil Rosenberg	PTS	12	May 23, 1922	Commonwealth Sporting Club, New York City, New York, US	
18	Loss	16–1–1	Abe Goldstein	PTS	4	May 19, 1922	Madison Square Garden, New York City, New York, US	
17	Win	16–0–1	Manny Wexler	PTS	12	Apr 18, 1922	Star S.C., New York City, New York, US	
16	Win	15–0–1	Sammy Cohen	PTS	12	Mar 25, 1922	Commonwealth Sporting Club, New York City, New York, US	
15	Win	14–0–1	Jack Sayles	PTS	12	Mar 14, 1922	Pioneer Sporting Club, New York City, New York, US	
14	Win	13–0–1	Leo Reynolds	PTS	10	Jan 10, 1922	Pioneer Sporting Club, New York City, New York, US	
13	Win	12–0–1	Henry 'Kid' Wolfe	NWS	8	Dec 26, 1921	National A.C., Philadelphia, Pennsylvania, US	
12	Win	11–0–1	Johnny Rosner	PTS	10	Dec 19, 1921	Lexington Avenue Theatre, New York City, New York, US	
11	Win	10–0–1	Andy Davis	UD	10	Dec 13, 1921	Pioneer Sporting Club, New York City, New York, US	
10	Win	9–0–1	Joey Leon	PTS	12	Nov 7, 1921	Star S.C., New York City, New York, US	
9	Win	8–0–1	Joe Colletti	PTS	12	Aug 12, 1921	Convention Hall, Saratoga Springs, New York, US	
8	Win	7–0–1	Bobby Doyle	PTS	15	May 21, 1921	9th Coast Defense Armory, New York City, New York, US	
7	Win	6–0–1	Jockey Joe Dillon	PTS	15	Apr 26, 1921	Hunts Point Palace, New York City, New York, US	
6	Win	5–0–1	Joe Colletti	PTS	10	Apr 9, 1921	Broadway Arena, New York City, New York, US	
5	Draw	4–0–1	Joe Colletti	PTS	12	Feb 16, 1921	Columbus Institute, Poughkeepsie, New York, US	
4	Win	4–0	Johnny Rosner	PTS	12	Dec 13, 1920	Star S.C., New York City, New York, US	
3	Win	3–0	Jimmy Peterson	PTS	10	Nov 3, 1920	Star S.C., New York City, New York, US	
2	Win	2–0	Billy Murphy	PTS	6	Oct 20, 1920	Star S.C., New York City, New York, US	
1	Win	1–0	Joe Colletti	DQ	3 (6)	Oct 15, 1920	Madison Square Garden, New York City, New York, US	Colletti DQ'd for low blow

Achievements
Preceded by Frenchy Belanger	NBA World Flyweight Champion; October 15, 1928 – March 2, 1929	Succeeded by Émile Pladner
Preceded by Émile Pladner	NBA World Flyweight Champion; April 18, 1929 – October 26, 1931	Succeeded by Victor Perez
