= Vicente Catada =

Argentine boxer

Vicente Catada (11 October 1903 – 21 February 1981) was an Argentine boxer who competed in the 1924 Summer Olympics. In 1924 he was eliminated in the first round of the flyweight class after losing his fight to the upcoming bronze medalist Raymond Fee.
