= Andrés Recalde =

Uruguayan boxer

Andrés Recalde Miguez (5 June 1904 – 17 January 1956) was a Uruguayan boxer who competed in the 1924 Summer Olympics. In 1924 he was eliminated in the first round of the flyweight class after losing his fight to Gaetano Lanzi.
