= Georges Gourdy =

French boxer

Georges Gourdy (10 October 1905 – 3 September 1987) was a French boxer. He competed in the 1924 Summer Olympics. In 1924, Gourdy was eliminated in the second round of the flyweight class after losing his fight to Rinaldo Castellenghi.
