= Bobby Leitham =

Canadian boxer (1906–1982)

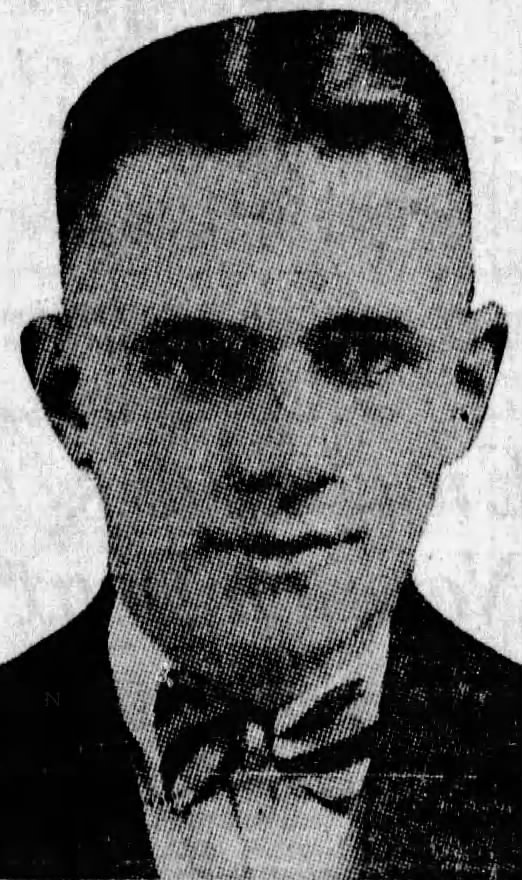

Personal information
- Nickname: Verdun Flash
- Nationality: (Canada) Canadian
- Born: Robert Leitham; 1906 Perth, Scotland, United Kingdom
- Died: July 27, 1982 (aged 75–76) Montreal, Quebec, Canada
- Occupation: Boxer
- Height: 5 ft 3 in (160cm)
- Weight: Bantamweight

Boxing career
- Stance: Orthodox

Boxing record
- Total fights: 55
- Wins: 29
- Win by KO: 4
- Losses: 18
- Draws: 8

Bobby Leitham (1906 – July 27, 1982) was a Scottish-born Canadian professional bantamweight boxer who held the Canadian bantamweight boxing championship from 1931 to 1934.

== Early life ==
Robert Leitham was born around 1906 in Scotland, United Kingdom.

== Amateur boxing career ==
Under the guidance of Jimmy Hutchins, Leitham competed as an amateur boxer from 1923 to 1927 and rose to the top of amateur competition.

Leitham fought out of the Verdun Athletic Club. Fighting in the 112-pound division, he won the Canadian amateur boxing championship in Winnipeg in late February 1925. The 112-pound Canadian amateur flyweight titleholder was one of five boxers selected to represent Canada at the Pan-American Boxing Federation tournament held in Boston on May 6, 1925. He was outpointed by Alfred Rollinson of the U.S. team in the semi-finals.

He competed in the provincial championships boxing tournament held at Lafontaine Hall from March 15 to March 18, 1926, which showcased the top amateur boxers from the province of Quebec. At the time, he held both the Canadian amateur flyweight title and a city amateur boxing championship while representing Verdun, Quebec. He became the provincial champion among Quebec's bantamweights at 118 pounds with a win over Art Gagne.

He was selected for the national amateur boxing championships held in New Westminster, British Columbia, where he entered two different classes. In May 1926, he captured the title in the flyweight division at the Canadian amateur boxing championships. He lost in his bid for the bantamweight title when he met Ainsworth of Vancouver in the final and was disqualified in the first round. Leitham later argued that the disqualification stemmed from an accidental fall, claiming Ainsworth collapsed after a body shot, pulled him down in the tumble, and struck his head on the canvas as Leitham tried to avoid landing on him.

He lost to Ontario's provincial champion Steve Rocco following an amateur bout in the Newboys' annual boxing tournament sponsored by the Lions Club. It was held in Toronto at the Arena Gardens before a record-setting crowd on May 3, 1926. He lost to Rocco, the future Canadian flyweight champion, again on May 26, 1926, dropping another decision loss.

He won 47 of 54 bouts during his amateur career, losing just seven times.

== Professional career ==
He announced his intentions to enter the professional boxing ranks in October 1926. Leitham made his pro debut at the Montreal Forum in Montreal, Quebec, in 1927.

In only his fifth pro fight, he faced future NBA world flyweight champion Frenchy Belanger at Toronto's Arena Gardens on September 12, 1927. He was stopped by Belanger in round 5 of 6.

He was matched up against Joe Villeneuve for his first shot at the Canadian bantamweight title in March 1929. He fought Villeneuve to a 10-round draw. After a string of fights, he faced Villeneuve in a rematch bout with the title on the line, which resulted in another draw.

=== Taking the Canadian bantamweight championship, October 1931 ===
Leitham fought Art Giroux in a championship bantamweight bout at the Mount Royal Arena on October 27, 1931. He was awarded the title after Giroux was disqualified in the sixth round.

==== Notable bouts during title reign ====
He delivered a knockout of Chilean boxer Routier Parra on April 6, 1931. He then fought Émile Pladner on April 28, 1931, in a bantamweight elimination tournament held by the Montreal Athletic Commission to select world bantamweight champion Panama Al Brown's opponent. After the distance of 10 rounds, Pladner was awarded the decision. The verdict drew widespread criticism from those at ringside and members of the press, while Leitham believed he had earned at least a draw.

He held the tenth position in The Ring magazine's 1931 bantamweight ratings.

He signed to face Giroux in a rematch for the Canadian bantamweight championship on June 16, 1932. In the seventh round, he scored a technical knockout of Giroux to retain the title in his first defense. The bout marked the first Canadian title bout in the history of the Mount Royal Arena.

After winning the Canadian championship, he took on Pladner in their rematch before 6,000 fans at the Forum in Montreal. He was outpointed after 12 rounds. The loss moved him further from contention for a world championship.

He defeated future world bantamweight champion Tony Marino at the Maple Leaf Gardens in October 1932.

Leitham traveled to England and challenged for the British Empire (now Commonwealth Boxing Council) bantamweight championship on June 12, 1933. He fought Johnny King, losing his bid for the title after fighting 15 rounds. He later collected wins over Dick Corbett and Jimmy O'Neil in July 1933.

After campaigning in England, he lost a split decision to Pete Sanstol on September 13, 1933. Days later, the Canadian champion faced the reigning NYSAC world flyweight champion, Midget Wolgast, in a non-title bout on September 27, 1933, and won by unanimous decision at the Montreal Forum. In a 12-round rematch with Sanstol on October 18, 1933, he was handed another split decision loss.

The Ring magazine's 1933 annual ratings, published in the February 1934 issue, ranked him ninth among bantamweights.

At the Arena Gardens in Detroit on February 2, 1934, he defeated Michigan bantamweight champion Ernie Maurer (54–1–6) by decision, then lost the rematch on points on February 21.

Leitham's last two professional bouts came against Sixto Escobar, the first Puerto Rican world bantamweight champion, in 1934. He was TKO'd in Escobar's American debut during the seventh round at the Valley Arena Gardens in May 1934. In their rematch at the Montreal Forum in June 1934, which proved to be his last fight, he was stopped again in the fifth round. The Canadian bantamweight title was vacated by Leitham by October 1934.

== Professional boxing record ==
63 fights	24 wins	27 losses
By knockout	5	4
By decision	19	23
Draws	12	

== Life after boxing ==
Leitham competed as an amateur swimmer. He entered the five-mile swim at Lachine, Quebec, on September 8, 1935, racing on a surveyed course along the Lachine wharf before an expected crowd of roughly 50,000. Although his swimming had received less attention than his boxing, he had previously won the Verdun wharf-to-wharf swim twice and placed third in the annual bridge-to-bridge event at Ste. Rose, a race won that year by noted distance swimmer George Young.

After his fighting career ended, the former bantamweight champion also became a boxing referee. He was licensed by the Montreal Boxing Commission in 1935. He served as a boxing referee until 1961.

He ventured into boxing promotion in Montreal in 1936. The Montreal Athletic Commission granted him a matchmaker's license on September 15, 1936. He organized his first boxing card at the Montreal Forum on September 28, 1936, featuring a main event between Frankie Martin and Baltasar Sangchili.

In 1940, he enlisted in the Royal Canadian Air Force. He was stationed in Yarmouth, Nova Scotia.

While working as a referee, he later became a boxing judge between 1947 and 1976.

== Death ==
Bobby Leitham died on July 27, 1982, in Montreal, Quebec, Canada.

Achievements
Preceded by Art Giroux	Canadian Bantamweight Champion; October 10, 1931 – November 8, 1934	Succeeded by Frankie Martin
