= Oscar Bergström =

Swedish boxer

Oscar Kristian Bergström (3 May 1903 – 3 January 1961) was a Swedish boxer who competed in the 1924 Summer Olympics. He was born and died in Stockholm at the age of 58. In 1924 he was eliminated in the quarter-finals of the flyweight class after losing his fight to the upcoming bronze medalist Raymond Fee.
