= Ruperto Biete =

Spanish boxer

Ruperto Biete Verdés (11 February 1906 in Barcelona – 25 March 1929 in Oviedo) was a Spanish boxer who competed in the 1924 Summer Olympics. In the flyweight class, he was eliminated in the quarter-finals after losing to Rinaldo Castellenghi.
