= Frenchy Belanger =

Canadian boxer (1906–1969)

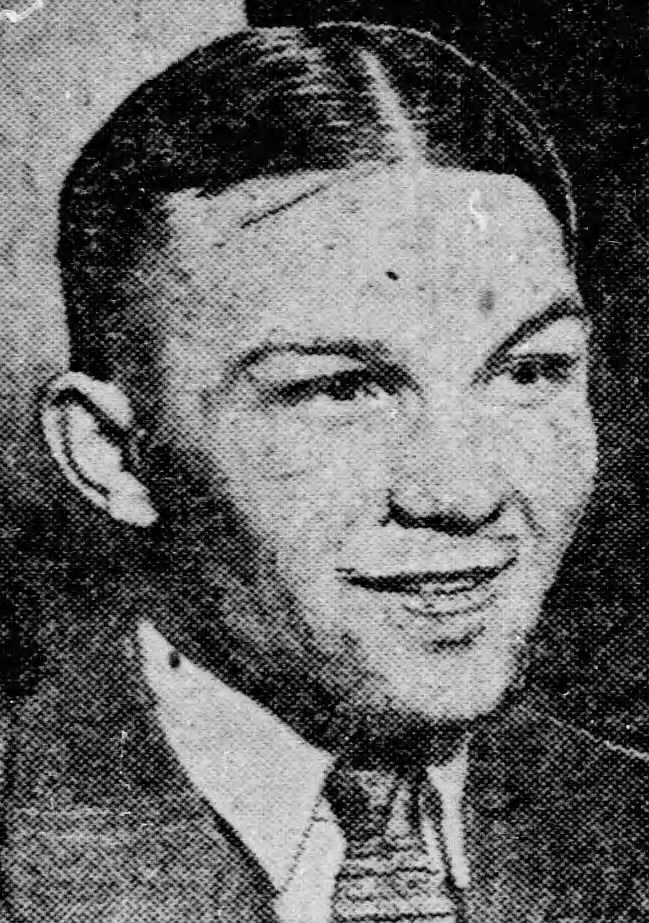

Personal information
- Nicknames: Canadian Wolverine; Canadian Tadpole
- Nationality: (Canada) Canadian
- Born: Albert Belanger; December 4, 1906 Toronto, Ontario, Canada
- Died: May 27, 1969 (aged 62) Toronto, Ontario, Canada
- Occupation: Boxer
- Height: 5 ft 4 in (163cm)
- Weight: Flyweight

Boxing career

Boxing record
- Total fights: 69
- Wins: 40
- Win by KO: 15
- Losses: 20
- Draws: 9

Frenchy Belanger (December 4, 1906 – May 27, 1969) was a Canadian professional flyweight boxer who became NBA world flyweight champion and three-time national flyweight champion.

== Early life ==
Albert Belanger was born on December 4, 1906, in Toronto, Ontario, Canada.

His family had been blacksmiths along the Ontario bank of the Ottawa River for five generations. Frenchy's father, Adolphe Belanger, left the blacksmithing trade for tailoring in Toronto where his son was born.

His childhood idol was Jimmy Wilde, and at fifteen he was already talking about becoming a professional boxer to make money.

== Professional boxing career ==
Belanger began his professional career in November 1924 at the Grand Opera House in Hamilton, Ontario, fighting to a draw. His first purse was $35, which he put toward his mother's rent.

On October 28, 1927, he faced Newsboy Brown in a flyweight single-elimination tournament run by the National Boxing Association (now the World Boxing Association). At the Coliseum in Toronto, he defeated Brown on points in his first 10-round bout. The knockdown and near-KO of Brown secured him the respect of opponents who followed. Belanger faced 1920 Olympian Frankie Genaro in the flyweight tournament semi-final on November 28, 1927. After ten rounds, he won a split decision verdict over Genaro. His win set up a world title fight with Ernie Jarvis from England.

=== Taking the NBA world flyweight championship, December 1927 ===
He faced Ernie Jarvis in a bout for the NBA world flyweight championship on December 19, 1927. Almost 10,000 fans filled Toronto's Coliseum for the title match officiated by Lou Marsh. Belanger scored a knockdown in the first round and suffered one himself during a wild exchange in the eleventh round. After twelve rounds, the 21-year-old was awarded a unanimous decision win and claimed the vacant world flyweight championship title.

He was rated second in the flyweight division by The Ring magazine in its 1927 annual ratings, behind then the leading contender Izzy Schwartz.

==== Losing the NBA world flyweight championship, February 1928 ====
Belanger defended his world title for the first time on February 6, 1928, meeting Frankie Genaro in a rematch. He lost by unanimous decision, and Genaro became the new flyweight champion. Belanger's reign as flyweight champion of the world lasted only six weeks.

=== Winning the Canadian flyweight championship, April 1928 ===
His manager Davey Garrity had him train with Jack Britton at a three-week camp in Miami Beach, Florida in preparation for his next fight. On April 27, 1928, Belanger met Montreal's Clovis Durand for the Canadian flyweight championship at Arena Gardens. He captured the national title with a points victory.

=== Losing the Canadian flyweight championship, June 1928 ===
Following a win over Frisco Grande in May 1928, he was scheduled for his first defense of the Canadian title. Belanger was lined up to defend his title against fellow Toronto fighter Steve Rocco, who was undefeated at the time. He lost the Canadian flyweight championship match on June 5, 1928.

In a rubber match with world champion Frankie Genaro on October 15, 1928, he again challenged for the NBA world flyweight championship at the Coliseum in Toronto. Belanger fell short in the world title bout, losing by unanimous decision.

=== Reclaiming the Canadian flyweight championship, January 1929 ===
Belanger's rematch with Steve Rocco, to whom he had lost his title, was scheduled for January 4, 1929. He won back the Canadian flyweight championship at the end of a ten-round title fight. After injuring his back against Rocco and contracting influenza, he broke training and requested two postponements before his next fight, relying on a custom back brace.

Belanger fought the reigning world flyweight champion, Izzy Schwartz, on February 8, 1929, dropping a points decision in a non-title bout. The following month, on March 12, 1929, he lost a rematch with Schwartz, with the NYSAC world flyweight title on the line.

At the Montreal Forum on April 17, 1929, Belanger battled Harry Hill to defend his Canadian flyweight championship but lost via unanimous decision. In a May rematch, Belanger regained the flyweight title for the third time with a sixth-round TKO victory over Hill.

Frenchy was soon scheduled to face France's Eugène Huat in an international flyweight bout. The Canadian flyweight champion suffered a knockout loss to Huat in October 1929. He was stopped in the sixth round of their ten-round battle at Arena Gardens.

Belanger pursued another title shot against Frankie Genaro for the NBA and IBU world flyweight crowns on June 10, 1930, following three consecutive victories. He lost the ten-round title fight by unanimous decision.

While holding the Canadian flyweight title, Belanger had numerous run-ins with the law. In Brampton, Ontario, during July 1929, Belanger was sentenced to seven days in county jail after pleading guilty to drunk driving.

A fight between Belanger and Bobby Leitham was arranged for April 1931. By April 8, 1931, the Ontario Athletic Commission stripped him of his title for breach of contract and indefinitely suspended him. He was later one of six arrested after being at the scene of a roadhouse shooting near Port Credit, on April 19, 1931.

During the summer of 1931, he signed to fight in the United States, where he was outpointed by Billy Passamento at the Utica Stadium.

In October 1931, the former boxing star found himself working at a Trans-Canada Highway unemployment camp between North Bay and Pembroke. He was enrolled as a laborer making $2.40 for eight-hour shifts. Following six months of hard labor that included chopping wood and road construction, he began planning a comeback at bantamweight.

He returned from a year's layoff in May 1932 for three final bouts, posting a 2–1 record. His last fight, against Frankie Wolfram, was stopped in round seven when his manager, Playfair Brown of the Shamrock A.C., threw in the towel.

After accumulating 52 professional bouts, Belanger retired in 1932 with a record featuring 13 knockout wins, 24 decision victories, and 7 draws.

== Professional boxing record ==
69 fights	40 wins	20 losses
By knockout	15	2
By decision	25	18
Draws	9	

== Death ==
Albert Belanger died in Toronto, Ontario, Canada, on May 27, 1969.

== Legacy ==
He was inducted into Canada's Sports Hall of Fame in 1956.

Achievements
Preceded by Vacant	NBA World Flyweight Champion; December 19, 1927– February 6, 1928	Succeeded by Frankie Genaro
Preceded by Vacant	Canadian Flyweight Champion; April 27, 1928 – June 5, 1928	Succeeded by Steve Rocco
Preceded by Steve Rocco	Canadian Flyweight Champion; January 4, 1929 – April 17, 1929	Succeeded by Harry Hill
Preceded by Harry Hill	Canadian Flyweight Champion; May 5, 1929 – April 8, 1931	Succeeded by Vacant
