= Myles McDonagh =

Irish boxer

Personal information
- Nationality: Irish
- Born: 10 April 1904
- Died: 18 March 1975 (aged 70)

Sport
- Sport: Boxing

Myles McDonagh (10 April 1904 – 18 March 1975) was an Irish boxer. He competed at the 1924 Summer Olympics and the 1928 Summer Olympics. At the 1924 Summer Olympics he lost to Ruperto Biete of Spain.
