= Steve Rocco (boxer) =

Canadian boxer (1908–1967)

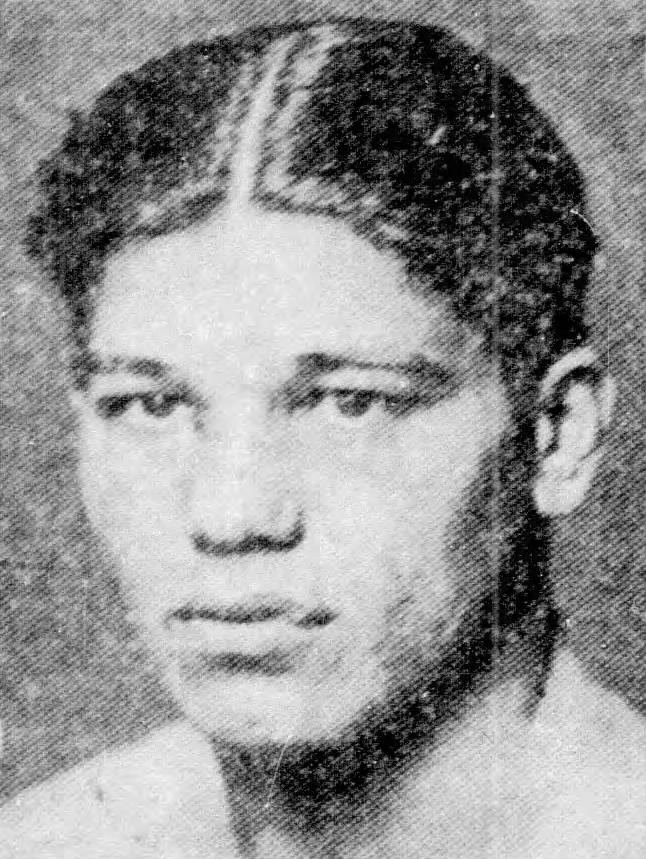

Personal information
- Nationality: (Canada) Canadian
- Born: Stephen Gerald Rocco; 1908 Toronto, Ontario, Canada
- Died: January 13, 1967 (aged 58–59) Toronto, Ontario, Canada
- Occupation: Boxer
- Weight: Flyweight; Bantamweight

Boxing career

Boxing record
- Total fights: 31
- Wins: 23
- Win by KO: 4
- Losses: 6
- Draws: 1

Steve Rocco (1908 – January 13, 1967) was an Italian-Canadian former professional flyweight boxer. He won the Canadian flyweight boxing championship in 1928.

== Early life ==
Stephen Gerald Rocco was born in Toronto, Ontario, Canada. He was of Italian descent.

In his early years, he worked as a newsboy in Toronto.

== Amateur boxing career ==
The former newsboy started competing in local amateur boxing shows. At the Ontario Amateur Boxing Championships in Toronto in April 1925, held under the Ontario A.A.U., Rocco won the 105-pound weight class championship.

In a notable rematch on May 26, 1926, he defeated Bobby Leitham, the Canadian amateur flyweight titleholder, for the second time. Rocco received a standing ovation both upon leaving the ring and again when receiving the cup from a local sportsman.

The provincial champion also held the title of international amateur flyweight champion but forfeited his amateur status, disqualifying him as a candidate for the 1928 Summer Olympics.

== Professional career ==
Rocco was initially denied professional bouts in Toronto because amateur boxing authorities hoped to reserve him for the Canadian Olympic team. He relocated to Detroit, where he broke into the professional ranks as a main event fighter. Making his pro debut in January 1928, he went undefeated in his first ten professional fights. His manager was Willie Morrisey.

=== Taking the Canadian flyweight championship, June 1928 ===
At the Arena Gardens on June 5, 1928, Rocco took on former world flyweight champion Frenchy Belanger for the Canadian flyweight championship. Rocco had only nine professional fights to his name and had never experienced a bout longer than six rounds. He beat Belanger via unanimous decision after ten rounds to win the title. The title fight drew 8,000 fight fans.

The following month, on July 23, 1928, Rocco made his first challenge for the NBA world flyweight title against world flyweight champion Frankie Genaro. He managed to hold the champion to a ten-round draw.

Rocco went on to secure a points win against the more experienced Marty Gold of Philadelphia in September 1928.

The Canadian flyweight titleholder was set to fight Frankie Genaro again in December 1928, six months after their first meeting. It marked the second time he boxed for the world championship. The championship bout at the Detroit Olympia ended early with a controversial unintentional foul in the second round. Without warning, Genaro suddenly collapsed to the canvas in pain and claimed that Rocco had delivered a low blow (combat sports). The referee disqualified the Canadian boxer and declared Genaro the winner.

The Ring magazine's 1928 annual ratings placed him fourth among the world's flyweights, behind champion Izzy Schwartz, Frankie Genaro, and Johnny Hill.

=== Losing the Canadian flyweight championship, January 1929 ===
Rocco's second bout with Frenchy Belanger came on January 4, 1929, where he lost his title in the championship fight officiated by Lou Marsh. The purse was divided, with Rocco earning about $3,500 and Belanger getting $2,300.

The former champion took part in a world flyweight elimination tournament held by Toronto's Shamrock Athletic Club to determine Eugène Huat's opponent. He beat Happy Atherton in November 1929, and his following match with Willie Davies that December was ruled a no-contest. He was later outpointed by Davies in a January 1930 rematch.

In its February 1930 issue, The Ring placed Rocco sixth among flyweights in the 1929 annual rankings.

Rocco secured back-to-back victories over Filipino champion Pablo Dano in 1930, taking the first fight in February by unanimous decision and the second on points. Three days after fighting Dano for the second time, he dropped a close split decision to Franklyn Young before bouncing back with wins against Marty Gold, Luis Carpentero, and Johnny Goodrich. The National Boxing Association ranked Rocco as the eighth-best flyweight in the world in September 1931. He fought Babe Triscaro in November 1931, and the winner was set to face U.S. champion Midget Wolgast for his NYSAC title. In the six-round bout held in Cleveland, he was outpointed by Triscaro, ending his chance at another world title shot.

Rocco held the fourth position in the NBA's flyweight rankings in January 1932, behind champion Wolgast, Genaro, and Speedy Dado.

The Toronto boxer was remanded for a week in June 1932 following his failure to appear in court on a charge of being a "found-in" at the Italian Recreation Club, which had been raided by police. Another raid in November 1932, months afterward, led to Rocco's arrest and the charge of keeping a gaming house. Police reported he was employed as the boxing instructor at the Continental Athletic Club, yet they noted little boxing in the clubrooms and discovered an alleged gambling operation with stuss games in progress instead. In January 1933, the court of appeal wiped out the $100 fines imposed on him on the basis that the charge should have been laid against the athletic club.

During his time of inactivity, he disappeared from the NBA flyweight rankings.

Rocco staged his return in March 1933, fighting the first of three final bouts in Toronto. Following a four-year run fighting flyweights, he stepped up to bantamweight, with a rematch against Marty Gold arranged at 118 pounds at the Mutual Street Arena on May 9, 1933. He outpointed Gold over six rounds. His final fight took place against Bobby Clary at the Maple Leaf Gardens on May 26, 1933.

== Professional boxing record ==
48 fights	23 wins	23 losses
By knockout	4	0
By decision	19	23
Draws	1	
No contests	1	

== Life after boxing ==
Rocco later became trainer and co-manager of Baby Yack, initially partnering with Mottle Goldman and then with his former manager Willie Morrisey in 1938.

== Death ==
Steve Rocco died on January 13, 1967, in Toronto, Ontario, Canada, at 59.

Achievements
Preceded by Frenchy Belanger	Canadian Flyweight Champion; June 5, 1928 – January 4, 1929	Succeeded by Frenchy Belanger
