= Fidel LaBarba =

American boxer

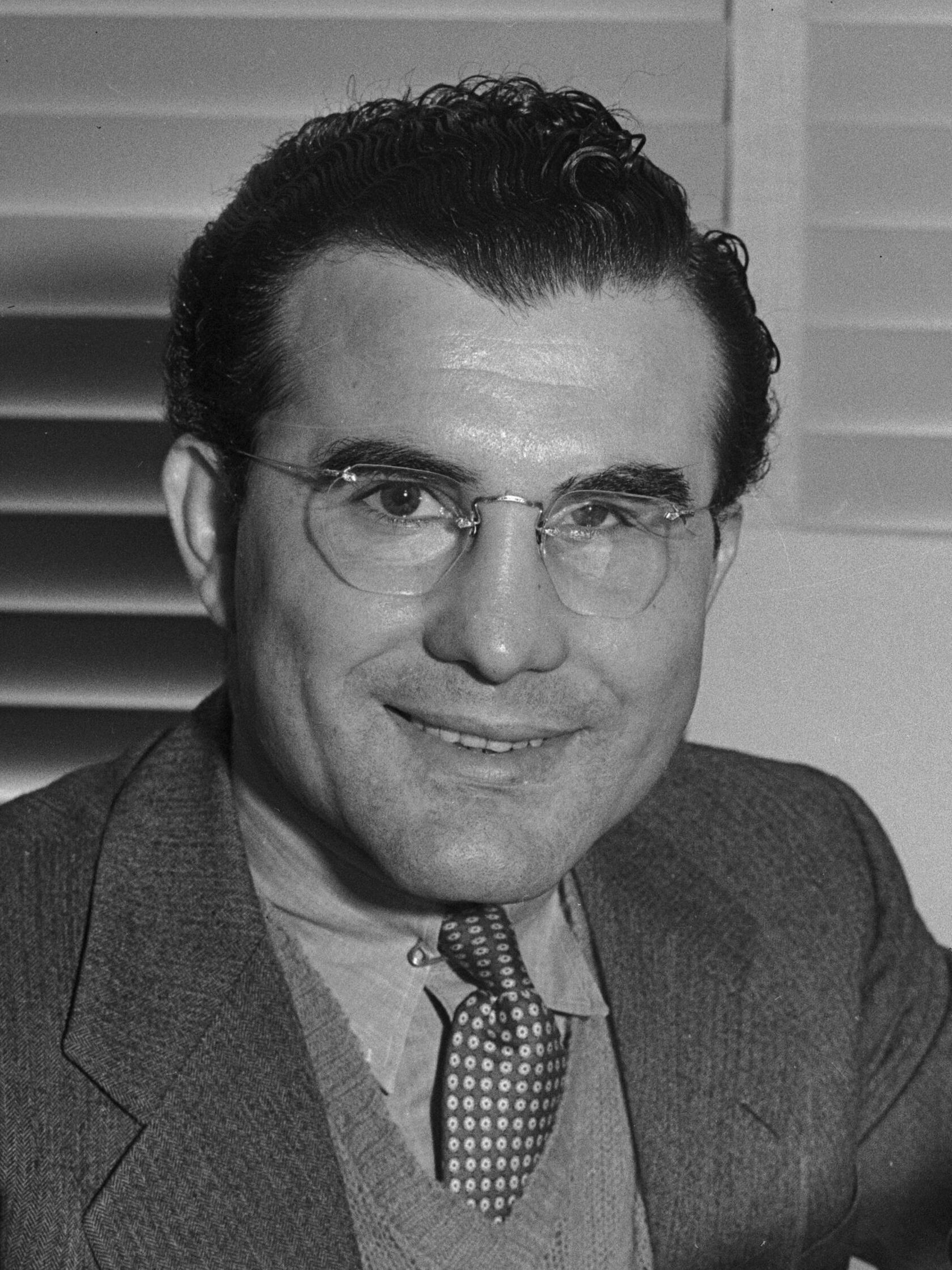
- LaBarba in 1935

Personal information
- Nationality: American
- Born: Fidel La Barba; September 29, 1905 New York City, New York
- Died: October 2, 1981 (aged 76) Los Angeles, California
- Height: 5 ft 3 in (160 cm)
- Weight: Flyweight

Boxing career
- Reach: 66 in (168 cm)
- Stance: Orthodox

Boxing record
- Total fights: 94
- Wins: 72
- Win by KO: 15
- Losses: 15
- Draws: 7
Medal record
Men's boxing
Representing the United States
Olympic Games
Gold medal – first place	1924 Paris	Flyweight

Fidel LaBarba (September 29, 1905 – October 2, 1981) was an American boxer and sportswriter. He was born in New York City and grew up in Los Angeles, California. LaBarba began his amateur career at fourteen, eventually winning the flyweight division at the national Amateur Athletic Union tournament in Boston and later qualifying for the United States Olympic team.

As a professional boxer, La Barba was an Undisputed World Champion in the flyweight division.

== Amateur career ==
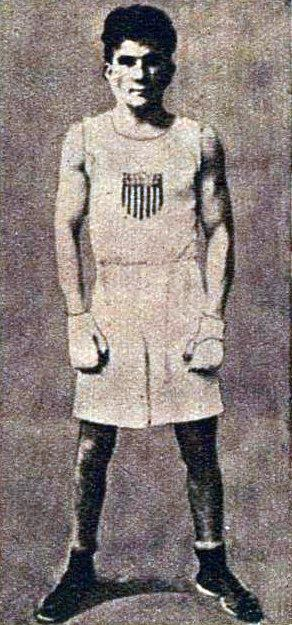
LaBarba in 1924.

LaBarba began boxing around age 12 or 13 in little amateur cards held weekly at places such as the Elks Club, which were promoted by Carlo Curtiss, who had been one of World Heavyweight Champion Jess Willard's managers. "Sometimes we would have nude women at these events," he said. The first known mention of "Young Fidel" is September 17, 1920, by the Los Angeles Times, announcing a boxing/wrestling show at the Italian picnic the next day at Selig Zoo where his opponent was to be "Battling Bennie", who was, like Fidel, a newsboy. Eventually, Central Junior High School boxing instructor Bob Howard saw his potential. According to an interview published January 28, 1927 in some United States newspapers, LaBarba mentioned that he defeated a boy named Dave Mariney (a.k.a. Marini) for the high school championship. Based upon this win, his friends suggested he join the amateurs, which he did. By this, he likely meant he joined the A.A.U. Fidel found it ironic that his first "official" amateur opponent was none other than Dave Mariney. This was at a semi-monthly boxing show sponsored by the Los Angeles Athletic Club (L.A.A.C). "It looked like a crime to match the two," reported the Los Angeles Times November 4, 1920. LaBarba was about four feet tall, and his opponent a foot and a half taller. "But LaBarba soon showed he knew how to take care of himself."

George Blake reportedly was the referee at that fight. He and Charles Keppen ran these L.A.A.C. shows. Blake had come to Los Angeles from Chicago in 1904. He had been a United States Army boxing instructor during World War I. By the early 1920s, Blake was a well-known referee for boxing venues such as Jack Doyle's Vernon Arena, and would become the regular referee at the soon-to-be-built Hollywood Legion Stadium. He was much-respected and known as a man of impeccable character. Blake took an interest in the young and talented Fidel LaBarba, and asked Bob Howard to have him come down to the club. " I was asked four or five times, but was embarrassed to go," LaBarba explained. He owned only one pair of torn tennis shoes. He finally mustered the fortitude to go see Blake; thus started a very long relationship. LaBarba continued to have many amateur bouts. "We would receive a gift worth $35.00," he noted. "Later, they would give us a gift certificate to buy clothes at places like the Broadway, or Sears."

Meanwhile, LaBarba attended Central Jr. High School, and then Lincoln High School—both in Los Angeles. He enjoyed playing basketball, baseball, and especially football. He was the quarterback for the "lightweight" (midget) football team. While in high school, he sometimes worked nights until midnight, racking pins at a bowling alley, then sleeping on a cot in back of the building. In the morning he would grab a bite to eat at the local restaurant, then head off to school about a mile away.

By 1924, LaBarba had lost only one bout after some 30-plus recorded contests. George Blake took eight of his L.A.A.C. boxers to Boston June 1924 for the Olympic trials, and LaBarba qualified. LaBarba won the gold medal in the flyweight division at the 1924 Summer Olympics in Paris. After the Games, Blake arranged an amateur card at Doyle's Vernon Arena with all the American Olympic fighters, at which LaBarba finished out his amateur career.

=== Olympic Results ===
- Jul 15, 1924 E. Warwick (England) @ Velodrome d'Hiver, Paris, France W-3 (first round)
- Jul 16, 1924 Gaetano Lanzi (Italy) @ Velodrome d'Hiver, Paris, France TKO-2 (second round)
- Jul 18, 1924 Rennis/Rennie (Canada) @ Velodrome d'Hiver, Paris, France W-3 (quarter-final Round)
- Jul 19?, 1924 Rinaldo Castellenghi @ Velodrome d'Hiver, Paris, France W-3 (semi-final Round)
- Jul 20, 1924 James McKenzie (G.B.) @ Velodrome d'Hiver, Paris, France W-3 (final)

== Pro career ==
Although still in high school, LaBarba turned professional that same year.

On August 22, 1925, LaBarba defeated Frankie Genaro in a convincing 10-round decision to win the American Flyweight title. In 1927, he defeated Elky Clark to win the vacant flyweight championship of the world. La Barba dominated the fight, knocked Clark down five times and won all twelve rounds.

Seven months later, LaBarba retired to enter Stanford University. Less than a year later, however, he returned to the ring as a featherweight. He won his first five fights, and in 1931 split two decisions with Kid Chocolate. On May 22, 1931, he was given an opportunity to win the world featherweight title, but was out pointed by Battling Battalino.

LaBarba's career was prematurely curtailed when he suffered a detached retina in training for a fight against Kid Chocolate for the New York featherweight title. On December 9, 1932, LaBarba not only lost the fight in a close decision, but went blind in his eye. After the fight, he underwent surgery to repair the tear, but it was unsuccessful and he eventually had to have the eye removed.

== Later life ==
In 1933, he was forced to retire, and returned to Stanford, where he earned a degree in journalism. After graduating from Stanford he worked as a sportswriter, and later worked in public relations, as a screenwriter, and as a technical advisor in Hollywood for boxing movies.

Fidel LaBarba died of heart failure in Los Angeles, California, in 1981. He was inducted into the International Boxing Hall of Fame in 1996.

== Professional boxing record ==
All information in this section is derived from BoxRec, unless otherwise stated.

=== Official record ===
95 fights	69 wins	15 losses
By knockout	16	0
By decision	52	15
By disqualification	1	0
Draws	6	
Newspaper decisions/draws	5	

All newspaper decisions are officially regarded as “no decision” bouts and are not counted in the win/loss/draw column.

No.	Result	Record	Opponent	Type	Round, time	Date	Location
95	Win	69–15–6 (5)	Mose Butch	UD	10	Feb 13, 1933	Motor Square Garden, Pittsburgh, Pennsylvania, US
94	Loss	68–15–6 (5)	Seaman Tommy Watson	UD	12	Jan 27, 1933	Madison Square Garden, New York City, New York, US
93	Loss	68–14–6 (5)	Tommy Paul	MD	10	Dec 29, 1932	Chicago Stadium, Chicago, Illinois, US
92	Loss	68–13–6 (5)	Kid Chocolate	MD	15	Dec 9, 1932	Madison Square Garden, New York City, New York, US
For world super featherweight title; For NYSAC and The Ring featherweight titles
91	Win	68–12–6 (5)	Conrad Sanico	TKO	6 (8)	Nov 10, 1932	Houston Arena, Honolulu, Hawaii
90	Win	67–12–6 (5)	Little Dempsey	PTS	10	Oct 15, 1932	Honolulu, Hawaii
89	Win	66–12–6 (5)	Sailor Ray Butler	PTS	10	Oct 8, 1932	Volcano Arena, Hilo, Hawaii
88	Win	65–12–6 (5)	Frank Torres	TKO	4 (8)	Sep 5, 1932	Maunaloa, Hawaii
87	Win	64–12–6 (5)	Vince Venturillo	TKO	10 (10), 2:50	Sep 2, 1932	Honolulu Stadium, Honolulu, Hawaii
86	Win	63–12–6 (5)	Al Citrino	TKO	6 (10)	Aug 12, 1932	Dreamland Auditorium, San Francisco, California, US
85	Win	62–12–6 (5)	Varias Milling	PTS	10	Jul 29, 1932	Legion Stadium, Hollywood, California, US
84	Win	61–12–6 (5)	Bobby Gray	KO	8 (10)	Jun 28, 1932	Forman's Arena, San Jose, California, US
83	Win	60–12–6 (5)	Tommy Paul	PTS	10	Jun 14, 1932	Olympic Auditorium, Los Angeles, California, US
82	Win	59–12–6 (5)	Varias Milling	PTS	10	Jun 2, 1932	Memorial Auditorium, Sacramento, California, US
81	Loss	58–12–6 (5)	Johnny Pena	PTS	10	Apr 29, 1932	Olympia Stadium, Detroit, Michigan, US
80	Win	58–11–6 (5)	Petey Sarron	PTS	10	Apr 22, 1932	Olympia Stadium, Detroit, Michigan, US
79	Win	57–11–6 (5)	Max Tarley	PTS	10	Apr 8, 1932	Stockton, California, US
78	Win	56–11–6 (5)	Varias Milling	PTS	10	Mar 11, 1932	Legion Stadium, Hollywood, California, US
77	Loss	55–11–6 (5)	Baby Arizmendi	PTS	10	Jan 1, 1932	El Toreo de Cuatro Caminos, Mexico City, Mexico
76	Win	55–10–6 (5)	Davey Jones	PTS	6	Dec 17, 1931	Greenwich Coliseum, Tacoma, Washington, US
75	Win	54–10–6 (5)	Benny Pelz	PTS	6	Dec 15, 1931	Auditorium, Portland, Oregon, US
74	Win	53–10–6 (5)	Lesie 'Wildcat' Carter	KO	1 (10), 2:10	Dec 9, 1931	Auditorium, Oakland, California, US
73	Win	52–10–6 (5)	Santiago Zorrilla	TKO	6 (10)	Nov 27, 1931	Legion Stadium, Hollywood, California, US
72	Win	51–10–6 (5)	Lesie 'Wildcat' Carter	PTS	6	Nov 10, 1931	Crystal Pool, Seattle, Washington, US
71	Win	50–10–6 (5)	Joe Guerrero	PTS	10	Oct 9, 1931	Memorial Auditorium, Sacramento, California, US
70	Win	49–10–6 (5)	Johnny Previs	PTS	10	Sep 16, 1931	Wilmington Bowl, Wilmington, California, US
69	Win	48–10–6 (5)	Isidro Pinto de Sa	PTS	10	Aug 21, 1931	Dreamland Auditorium, San Francisco, California, US
68	Win	47–10–6 (5)	Santiago Zorrilla	PTS	10	Aug 6, 1931	Memorial Auditorium, Sacramento, California, US
67	Win	46–10–6 (5)	Jackie Mandell	KO	1 (10)	Jul 20, 1931	Memorial Civic Auditorium, Stockton, California, US
66	Win	45–10–6 (5)	Ray Montoya	PTS	10	Jul 4, 1931	Pismo Beach Arena, Pismo Beach, California, US
65	Loss	44–10–6 (5)	Claude Varner	PTS	10	Jun 26, 1931	Legion Stadium, Hollywood, California, US
64	Loss	44–9–6 (5)	Christopher Battalino	UD	15	May 22, 1931	Madison Square Garden, New York City, New York, US
For NYSAC, NBA, and The Ring featherweight titles
63	Win	44–8–6 (5)	Kid Francis	UD	10	Mar 27, 1931	Madison Square Garden, New York City, New York, US
62	Draw	43–8–6 (5)	Claude Varner	PTS	10	Feb 3, 1931	Olympic Auditorium, Los Angeles, California, US
61	Loss	43–8–5 (5)	Eddie Shea	PTS	10	Dec 10, 1930	Public Hall, Cleveland, Ohio, US
60	Win	43–7–5 (5)	Charles 'Bud' Taylor	PTS	10	Nov 28, 1930	Madison Square Garden, New York City, New York, US
59	Win	42–7–5 (5)	Kid Chocolate	UD	10	Nov 3, 1930	Madison Square Garden, New York City, New York, US
58	Draw	41–7–5 (5)	Earl Mastro	PTS	10	Aug 7, 1930	Chicago Stadium, Chicago, Illinois, US
57	Win	41–7–4 (5)	Bushy Graham	PTS	10	May 28, 1930	Madison Square Garden, New York City, New York, US
56	Win	40–7–4 (5)	Charles 'Bud' Taylor	PTS	10	Apr 21, 1930	Coliseum, Chicago, Illinois, US
55	Win	39–7–4 (5)	Tommy Paul	UD	10	Apr 4, 1930	Broadway Auditorium, Buffalo, New York, US
54	Win	38–7–4 (5)	Santiago Zorrilla	PTS	10	Mar 4, 1930	Olympic Auditorium, Los Angeles, California, US
53	Win	37–7–4 (5)	Charley Sullivan	KO	5 (10)	Feb 14, 1930	Legion Stadium, Hollywood, California, US
52	Win	36–7–4 (5)	Johnny Torres	PTS	10	Jan 28, 1930	Olympic Auditorium, Los Angeles, California, US
51	Win	35–7–4 (5)	Ignacio Fernandez	PTS	10	Jan 14, 1930	Olympic Auditorium, Los Angeles, California, US
50	Loss	34–7–4 (5)	Kid Francis	PTS	12	Oct 12, 1929	Velodrome d'Hiver, Paris, France
49	Win	34–6–4 (5)	Jackie Mandell	TKO	8 (10)	Aug 30, 1929	Legion Stadium, Hollywood, California, US
48	Loss	33–6–4 (5)	Earl Mastro	PTS	10	Jun 25, 1929	Olympic Auditorium, Los Angeles, California, US
47	Win	33–5–4 (5)	Tommy Paul	MD	6	Jun 7, 1929	Broadway Auditorium, Buffalo, New York, US
46	Loss	32–5–4 (5)	Kid Chocolate	MD	10	May 22, 1929	New York Coliseum, New York City, New York, US
45	Win	32–4–4 (5)	Willie Smith	TKO	12 (15)	Mar 16, 1929	Sydney Stadium, Sydney, Australia
44	Win	31–4–4 (5)	Billy Grime	PTS	15	Mar 2, 1929	West Melbourne Stadium, Melbourne, Australia
43	Win	30–4–4 (5)	Willie Smith	PTS	15	Feb 9, 1929	Sydney Stadium, Sydney, Australia
42	Win	29–4–4 (5)	Billy 'Young' McAllister	KO	4 (15)	Jan 26, 1929	Sydney Stadium, Sydney, Australia
41	Win	28–4–4 (5)	Ray Ravani	KO	8 (10)	Nov 23, 1927	Dreamland Auditorium, San Francisco, California, US
40	Win	27–4–4 (5)	Young Nationalista	PTS	10	Sep 25, 1927	Olympic Auditorium, Los Angeles, California, US
39	Win	26–4–4 (5)	Bushy Graham	PTS	10	Sep 11, 1927	Olympic Auditorium, Los Angeles, California, US
38	Win	25–4–4 (5)	Earl Mastro	PTS	10	Aug 7, 1927	Olympic Auditorium, Los Angeles, California, US
37	Win	24–4–4 (5)	Huerta Evans	PTS	10	Jul 17, 1927	Olympic Auditorium, Los Angeles, California, US
36	Win	23–4–4 (5)	Johnny Vacca	PTS	10	Aug 23, 1927	Olympic Auditorium, Los Angeles, California, US
35	Win	22–4–4 (5)	Memphis Pal Moore	PTS	10	Jul 12, 1927	Wrigley Field, Chicago, Illinois, US
34	Draw	21–4–4 (5)	Clarence Rosen	NWS	10	Jun 27, 1927	Bay City, Michigan, US
33	Win	21–4–4 (4)	Mike Brody	NWS	10	Jun 21, 1927	University of St. Louis Athletic Field, Saint Louis, Missouri, US
32	Win	21–4–4 (3)	Willie LaMorte	TKO	10 (12)	May 27, 1927	Public Hall, Cleveland, Ohio, US
31	Win	20–4–4 (3)	Babe Kellar	NWS	10	May 11, 1927	Kalamazoo, Michigan, US
30	Win	20–4–4 (2)	Billy Shaw	PTS	10	Apr 29, 1927	Arena Gardens, Detroit, Michigan, US
29	Win	19–4–4 (2)	Young Montreal	PTS	10	Apr 11, 1927	Rhode Island Auditorium, Providence, Rhode Island, US
28	Loss	18–4–4 (2)	Johnny Vacca	PTS	10	Mar 21, 1927	Arena, Boston, Massachusetts, US
27	Loss	18–3–4 (2)	Johnny Vacca	PTS	10	Feb 14, 1927	Mechanics Building, Boston, Massachusetts, US
26	Win	18–2–4 (2)	Elky Clark	UD	12	Jan 21, 1927	Madison Square Garden, New York City, New York, US
Retained NBA flyweight title; Won vacant NYSAC and The Ring flyweight titles
25	Win	17–2–4 (2)	Delos 'Kid' Williams	PTS	10	Dec 17, 1926	Civic Auditorium, Fresno, California, US
24	Win	16–2–4 (2)	California Joe Lynch	DQ	4 (10)	Nov 19, 1926	Dreamland Rink, San Francisco, California, US
23	Draw	15–2–4 (2)	Young Nationalista	PTS	10	Oct 26, 1926	Olympic Auditorium, Los Angeles, California, US
22	Draw	15–2–3 (2)	Newsboy Brown	PTS	10	Oct 5, 1926	Arena, Vernon, California, US
21	Win	15–2–2 (2)	Paul Milnar	PTS	8	Sep 2, 1926	Peoria, Illinois, US
20	Win	14–2–2 (2)	Happy Atherton	PTS	10	Aug 25, 1926	Loyola University Athletic Field, Chicago, Illinois, US
19	Win	13–2–2 (2)	Emil Paluso	PTS	10	Aug 13, 1926	Comiskey Park, Chicago, Illinois, US
18	Win	12–2–2 (2)	Georgie Rivers	PTS	10	Jul 7, 1926	Olympic Auditorium, Los Angeles, California, US
Retained NBA and American flyweight titles
17	Win	11–2–2 (2)	Emil Paluso	NWS	12	May 4, 1926	Arena, Vernon, California, US
16	Win	11–2–2 (1)	Clever Sencio	PTS	10	Mar 31, 1926	Olympic Auditorium, Los Angeles, California, US
15	Win	10–2–2 (1)	Vic King	TKO	4 (10)	Mar 12, 1926	Legion Stadium, Hollywood, California, US
14	Win	9–2–2 (1)	Clever Sencio	NWS	12	Jan 20, 1926	Olympic Auditorium, Los Angeles, California, US
13	Win	9–2–2	Lew Perfetti	PTS	6	Dec 23, 1925	Madison Square Garden, New York City, New York, US
12	Win	8–2–2	Ray Fee	TKO	1 (10), 2:09	Nov 20, 1925	Legion Stadium, Hollywood, California, US
11	Win	7–2–2	Frankie Genaro	PTS	10	Aug 22, 1925	Ascot Park, Los Angeles, California, US
Won American and vacant NBA flyweight titles
10	Win	6–2–2	Georgie Rivers	PTS	10	Jul 17, 1925	Legion Stadium, Hollywood, California, US
9	Win	5–2–2	Teddy Silva	PTS	10	May 29, 1925	Legion Stadium, Hollywood, California, US
8	Draw	4–2–2	Newsboy Brown	PTS	10	Apr 17, 1925	Legion Stadium, Hollywood, California, US
7	Win	4–2–1	Georgie Rivers	PTS	10	Mar 20, 1925	Legion Stadium, Hollywood, California, US
6	Win	3–2–1	Young Nationalista	PTS	10	Feb 20, 1925	Legion Stadium, Hollywood, California, US
5	Loss	2–2–1	Jimmy McLarnin	PTS	10	Jan 13, 1925	Arena, Vernon, California, US
4	Win	2–1–1	Pedro Villa	PTS	4	Dec 4, 1924	Chief Petty Officers Club, San Pedro, California, US
3	Draw	1–1–1	Jimmy McLarnin	PTS	4	Nov 11, 1924	Arena, Vernon, California, US
2	Loss	1–1	Jimmy McLarnin	PTS	4	Oct 28, 1924	Arena, Vernon, California, US
1	Win	1–0	Frankie Grandetta	PTS	4	Oct 14, 1924	Arena, Vernon, California, US

=== Unofficial record ===
95 fights	73 wins	15 losses
By knockout	16	0
By decision	56	15
By disqualification	1	0
Draws	7	

Record with the inclusion of newspaper decisions in the win/loss/draw column.

No.	Result	Record	Opponent	Type	Round	Date	Location
95	Win	73–15–7	Mose Butch	UD	10	Feb 13, 1933	Motor Square Garden, Pittsburgh, Pennsylvania, US
94	Loss	72–15–7	Seaman Tommy Watson	UD	12	Jan 27, 1933	Madison Square Garden, New York City, New York, US
93	Loss	72–14–7	Tommy Paul	MD	10	Dec 29, 1932	Chicago Stadium, Chicago, Illinois, US
92	Loss	72–13–7	Kid Chocolate	MD	15	Dec 9, 1932	Madison Square Garden, New York City, New York, US
For world super featherweight title; For NYSAC and The Ring featherweight titles
91	Win	72–12–7	Conrad Sanico	TKO	6 (8)	Nov 10, 1932	Houston Arena, Honolulu, Hawaii
90	Win	71–12–7	Little Dempsey	PTS	10	Oct 15, 1932	Honolulu, Hawaii
89	Win	70–12–7	Sailor Ray Butler	PTS	10	Oct 8, 1932	Volcano Arena, Hilo, Hawaii
88	Win	69–12–7	Frank Torres	TKO	4 (8)	Sep 5, 1932	Maunaloa, Hawaii
87	Win	68–12–7	Vince Venturillo	TKO	10 (10), 2:50	Sep 2, 1932	Honolulu Stadium, Honolulu, Hawaii
86	Win	67–12–7	Al Citrino	TKO	6 (10)	Aug 12, 1932	Dreamland Auditorium, San Francisco, California, US
85	Win	66–12–7	Varias Milling	PTS	10	Jul 29, 1932	Legion Stadium, Hollywood, California, US
84	Win	65–12–7	Bobby Gray	KO	8 (10)	Jun 28, 1932	Forman's Arena, San Jose, California, US
83	Win	64–12–7	Tommy Paul	PTS	10	Jun 14, 1932	Olympic Auditorium, Los Angeles, California, US
82	Win	63–12–7	Varias Milling	PTS	10	Jun 2, 1932	Memorial Auditorium, Sacramento, California, US
81	Loss	62–12–7	Johnny Pena	PTS	10	Apr 29, 1932	Olympia Stadium, Detroit, Michigan, US
80	Win	62–11–7	Petey Sarron	PTS	10	Apr 22, 1932	Olympia Stadium, Detroit, Michigan, US
79	Win	61–11–7	Max Tarley	PTS	10	Apr 8, 1932	Stockton, California, US
78	Win	60–11–7	Varias Milling	PTS	10	Mar 11, 1932	Legion Stadium, Hollywood, California, US
77	Loss	59–11–7	Baby Arizmendi	PTS	10	Jan 1, 1932	El Toreo de Cuatro Caminos, Mexico City, Mexico
76	Win	59–10–7	Davey Jones	PTS	6	Dec 17, 1931	Greenwich Coliseum, Tacoma, Washington, US
75	Win	58–10–7	Benny Pelz	PTS	6	Dec 15, 1931	Auditorium, Portland, Oregon, US
74	Win	57–10–7	Lesie 'Wildcat' Carter	KO	1 (10), 2:10	Dec 9, 1931	Auditorium, Oakland, California, US
73	Win	56–10–7	Santiago Zorrilla	TKO	6 (10)	Nov 27, 1931	Legion Stadium, Hollywood, California, US
72	Win	55–10–7	Lesie 'Wildcat' Carter	PTS	6	Nov 10, 1931	Crystal Pool, Seattle, Washington, US
71	Win	54–10–7	Joe Guerrero	PTS	10	Oct 9, 1931	Memorial Auditorium, Sacramento, California, US
70	Win	53–10–7	Johnny Previs	PTS	10	Sep 16, 1931	Wilmington Bowl, Wilmington, California, US
69	Win	52–10–7	Isidro Pinto de Sa	PTS	10	Aug 21, 1931	Dreamland Auditorium, San Francisco, California, US
68	Win	51–10–7	Santiago Zorrilla	PTS	10	Aug 6, 1931	Memorial Auditorium, Sacramento, California, US
67	Win	50–10–7	Jackie Mandell	KO	1 (10)	Jul 20, 1931	Memorial Civic Auditorium, Stockton, California, US
66	Win	49–10–7	Ray Montoya	PTS	10	Jul 4, 1931	Pismo Beach Arena, Pismo Beach, California, US
65	Loss	48–10–7	Claude Varner	PTS	10	Jun 26, 1931	Legion Stadium, Hollywood, California, US
64	Loss	48–9–7	Christopher Battalino	UD	15	May 22, 1931	Madison Square Garden, New York City, New York, US
For NYSAC, NBA, and The Ring featherweight titles
63	Win	48–8–7	Kid Francis	UD	10	Mar 27, 1931	Madison Square Garden, New York City, New York, US
62	Draw	47–8–7	Claude Varner	PTS	10	Feb 3, 1931	Olympic Auditorium, Los Angeles, California, US
61	Loss	47–8–6	Eddie Shea	PTS	10	Dec 10, 1930	Public Hall, Cleveland, Ohio, US
60	Win	47–7–6	Charles 'Bud' Taylor	PTS	10	Nov 28, 1930	Madison Square Garden, New York City, New York, US
59	Win	46–7–6	Kid Chocolate	UD	10	Nov 3, 1930	Madison Square Garden, New York City, New York, US
58	Draw	45–7–6	Earl Mastro	PTS	10	Aug 7, 1930	Chicago Stadium, Chicago, Illinois, US
57	Win	45–7–5	Bushy Graham	PTS	10	May 28, 1930	Madison Square Garden, New York City, New York, US
56	Win	44–7–5	Charles 'Bud' Taylor	PTS	10	Apr 21, 1930	Coliseum, Chicago, Illinois, US
55	Win	43–7–5	Tommy Paul	UD	10	Apr 4, 1930	Broadway Auditorium, Buffalo, New York, US
54	Win	42–7–5	Santiago Zorrilla	PTS	10	Mar 4, 1930	Olympic Auditorium, Los Angeles, California, US
53	Win	41–7–5	Charley Sullivan	KO	5 (10)	Feb 14, 1930	Legion Stadium, Hollywood, California, US
52	Win	40–7–5	Johnny Torres	PTS	10	Jan 28, 1930	Olympic Auditorium, Los Angeles, California, US
51	Win	39–7–5	Ignacio Fernandez	PTS	10	Jan 14, 1930	Olympic Auditorium, Los Angeles, California, US
50	Loss	38–7–5	Kid Francis	PTS	12	Oct 12, 1929	Velodrome d'Hiver, Paris, France
49	Win	38–6–5	Jackie Mandell	TKO	8 (10)	Aug 30, 1929	Legion Stadium, Hollywood, California, US
48	Loss	37–6–5	Earl Mastro	PTS	10	Jun 25, 1929	Olympic Auditorium, Los Angeles, California, US
47	Win	37–5–5	Tommy Paul	MD	6	Jun 7, 1929	Broadway Auditorium, Buffalo, New York, US
46	Loss	36–5–5	Kid Chocolate	MD	10	May 22, 1929	New York Coliseum, New York City, New York, US
45	Win	36–4–5	Willie Smith	TKO	12 (15)	Mar 16, 1929	Sydney Stadium, Sydney, Australia
44	Win	35–4–5	Billy Grime	PTS	15	Mar 2, 1929	West Melbourne Stadium, Melbourne, Australia
43	Win	34–4–5	Willie Smith	PTS	15	Feb 9, 1929	Sydney Stadium, Sydney, Australia
42	Win	33–4–5	Billy 'Young' McAllister	KO	4 (15)	Jan 26, 1929	Sydney Stadium, Sydney, Australia
41	Win	32–4–5	Ray Ravani	KO	8 (10)	Nov 23, 1927	Dreamland Auditorium, San Francisco, California, US
40	Win	31–4–5	Young Nationalista	PTS	10	Sep 25, 1927	Olympic Auditorium, Los Angeles, California, US
39	Win	30–4–5	Bushy Graham	PTS	10	Sep 11, 1927	Olympic Auditorium, Los Angeles, California, US
38	Win	29–4–5	Earl Mastro	PTS	10	Aug 7, 1927	Olympic Auditorium, Los Angeles, California, US
37	Win	28–4–5	Huerta Evans	PTS	10	Jul 17, 1927	Olympic Auditorium, Los Angeles, California, US
36	Win	27–4–5	Johnny Vacca	PTS	10	Aug 23, 1927	Olympic Auditorium, Los Angeles, California, US
35	Win	26–4–5	Memphis Pal Moore	PTS	10	Jul 12, 1927	Wrigley Field, Chicago, Illinois, US
34	Draw	25–4–5	Clarence Rosen	NWS	10	Jun 27, 1927	Bay City, Michigan, US
33	Win	25–4–4	Mike Brody	NWS	10	Jun 21, 1927	University of St. Louis Athletic Field, Saint Louis, Missouri, US
32	Win	24–4–4	Willie LaMorte	TKO	10 (12)	May 27, 1927	Public Hall, Cleveland, Ohio, US
31	Win	23–4–4	Babe Kellar	NWS	10	May 11, 1927	Kalamazoo, Michigan, US
30	Win	22–4–4	Billy Shaw	PTS	10	Apr 29, 1927	Arena Gardens, Detroit, Michigan, US
29	Win	21–4–4	Young Montreal	PTS	10	Apr 11, 1927	Rhode Island Auditorium, Providence, Rhode Island, US
28	Loss	20–4–4	Johnny Vacca	PTS	10	Mar 21, 1927	Arena, Boston, Massachusetts, US
27	Loss	20–3–4	Johnny Vacca	PTS	10	Feb 14, 1927	Mechanics Building, Boston, Massachusetts, US
26	Win	20–2–4	Elky Clark	UD	12	Jan 21, 1927	Madison Square Garden, New York City, New York, US
Retained NBA flyweight title; Won vacant NYSAC and The Ring flyweight titles
25	Win	19–2–4	Delos 'Kid' Williams	PTS	10	Dec 17, 1926	Civic Auditorium, Fresno, California, US
24	Win	18–2–4	California Joe Lynch	DQ	4 (10)	Nov 19, 1926	Dreamland Rink, San Francisco, California, US
23	Draw	17–2–4	Young Nationalista	PTS	10	Oct 26, 1926	Olympic Auditorium, Los Angeles, California, US
22	Draw	17–2–3	Newsboy Brown	PTS	10	Oct 5, 1926	Arena, Vernon, California, US
21	Win	17–2–2	Paul Milnar	PTS	8	Sep 2, 1926	Peoria, Illinois, US
20	Win	16–2–2	Happy Atherton	PTS	10	Aug 25, 1926	Loyola University Athletic Field, Chicago, Illinois, US
19	Win	15–2–2	Emil Paluso	PTS	10	Aug 13, 1926	Comiskey Park, Chicago, Illinois, US
18	Win	14–2–2	Georgie Rivers	PTS	10	Jul 7, 1926	Olympic Auditorium, Los Angeles, California, US
Retained NBA and American flyweight titles
17	Win	13–2–2	Emil Paluso	NWS	12	May 4, 1926	Arena, Vernon, California, US
16	Win	12–2–2	Clever Sencio	PTS	10	Mar 31, 1926	Olympic Auditorium, Los Angeles, California, US
15	Win	11–2–2	Vic King	TKO	4 (10)	Mar 12, 1926	Legion Stadium, Hollywood, California, US
14	Win	10–2–2	Clever Sencio	NWS	12	Jan 20, 1926	Olympic Auditorium, Los Angeles, California, US
13	Win	9–2–2	Lew Perfetti	PTS	6	Dec 23, 1925	Madison Square Garden, New York City, New York, US
12	Win	8–2–2	Ray Fee	TKO	1 (10), 2:09	Nov 20, 1925	Legion Stadium, Hollywood, California, US
11	Win	7–2–2	Frankie Genaro	PTS	10	Aug 22, 1925	Ascot Park, Los Angeles, California, US
Won American and vacant NBA flyweight titles
10	Win	6–2–2	Georgie Rivers	PTS	10	Jul 17, 1925	Legion Stadium, Hollywood, California, US
9	Win	5–2–2	Teddy Silva	PTS	10	May 29, 1925	Legion Stadium, Hollywood, California, US
8	Draw	4–2–2	Newsboy Brown	PTS	10	Apr 17, 1925	Legion Stadium, Hollywood, California, US
7	Win	4–2–1	Georgie Rivers	PTS	10	Mar 20, 1925	Legion Stadium, Hollywood, California, US
6	Win	3–2–1	Young Nationalista	PTS	10	Feb 20, 1925	Legion Stadium, Hollywood, California, US
5	Loss	2–2–1	Jimmy McLarnin	PTS	10	Jan 13, 1925	Arena, Vernon, California, US
4	Win	2–1–1	Pedro Villa	PTS	4	Dec 4, 1924	Chief Petty Officers Club, San Pedro, California, US
3	Draw	1–1–1	Jimmy McLarnin	PTS	4	Nov 11, 1924	Arena, Vernon, California, US
2	Loss	1–1	Jimmy McLarnin	PTS	4	Oct 28, 1924	Arena, Vernon, California, US
1	Win	1–0	Frankie Grandetta	PTS	4	Oct 14, 1924	Arena, Vernon, California, US

== Titles in boxing ==
=== Major world titles ===
- NYSAC flyweight champion (112 lbs)
- NBA (WBA) flyweight champion (112 lbs)

=== The Ring magazine titles ===
- The Ring flyweight champion (112 lbs)

=== Regional/International titles ===
- American flyweight champion (112 lbs)

=== Undisputed titles ===
- Undisputed flyweight champion

== See also ==
- List of flyweight boxing champions

Achievements
Vacant Title last held by Pancho Villa	World Flyweight Champion; August 22, 1925 – August 23, 1927 vacated	Vacant Title next held by Benny Lynch
