= Leo Turksma =

Dutch boxer

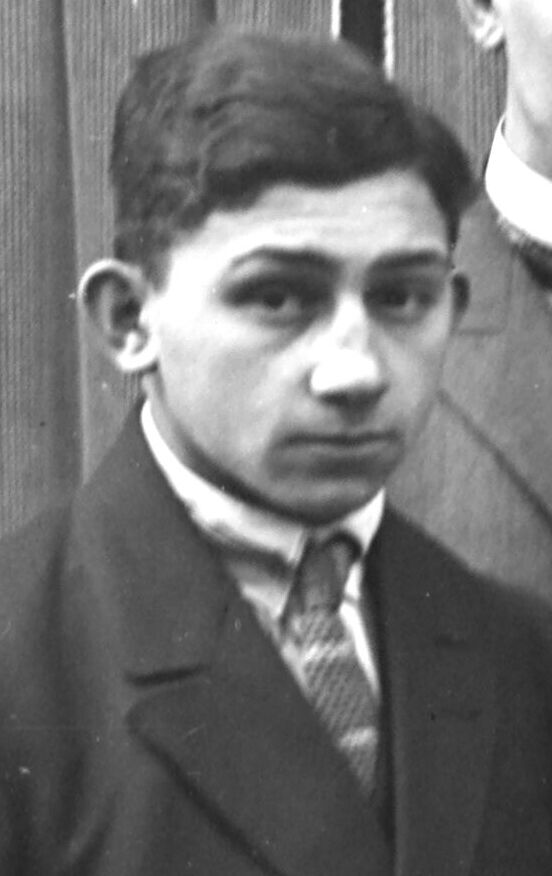
Leo Turksma in 1924

Levy Leopold "Leo" Turksma (25 August 1905 – 9 February 1987) was a Dutch boxer who competed in the 1924 Summer Olympics. He was born in Nijmegen and died in The Hague. In 1924 he was eliminated in the second round of the flyweight class after losing his fight to James McKenzie of Great Britain.

== 1924 Olympic results ==
Below are the results of Leo Turksma, a Dutch flyweight boxer who competed at the 1924 Paris Olympics:

- Round of 32: bye
- Round of 16: lost to James McKenzie (Great Britain) by a third-round knockout
