= Samuel Rennie =

Canadian boxer

Personal information
- Born: 18 July 1903; Montreal, Quebec, Canada
- Died: 28 February 1952 (aged 48); Montreal, Quebec, Canada

Sport
- Sport: Boxing

Samuel Rennie (18 July 1903 – 28 February 1952) was a Canadian boxer. He competed in the men's flyweight event at the 1924 Summer Olympics.
