= Harry Stein (boxer) =

German boxer

Personal information
- Nationality: (Germany) German; Polish by birth Russian
- Born: January 20, 1905 Bytom, Poland
- Died: Date unknown; believed to be prior to 1948
- Weight: Flyweight; Featherweight

Boxing career
- Stance: Orthodox

Boxing record
- Total fights: 110
- Wins: 62
- Win by KO: 21
- Losses: 24
- Draws: 21
- No contests: 3

Harry Stein (born January 20, 1905, in Bytom, than East Prussia; date of death unknown, before 1948) was a German amateur boxing champion in 1922 and 1923 in the flyweight(- 51 kg) and featherweight divisions, who won the BDB German Flyweight Championship in 1925, and the VDF German Featherweight Championship in 1932. He was forced to flee Germany for Prague, Poland in 1933 to escape Nazi persecution, and by the 1940s, he had moved to Russia.

== Early life and amateur career ==
Stein was born on January 20, 1905, in Bytom, East Prussia, currently part of Poland to Jewish parents. He was the German Amateur Flyweight Champion from 1922 to 1923. His primary residence was Berlin, Germany from 1924 to 1933, while he established and pursued his boxing career.

Maccabee boxing club trophy inscription, name at bottom

In the 1920s Stein was recognized by the German Maccabee organization, boxing club, 'Jüdischer Boxclub Maccabi' of Berlin with a boxing trophy on the occasion of his 30th fight. The Maccabee organization managed a few German gyms for Jewish youth in Germany, which included a club in Berlin that featured boxing training. The sizable Macabee organization would move its headquarters from Berlin to London in July 1933, around the same time Stein would move to Poland to escape the rise of the Nazis who had come to power in Germany that January.

== Early conquest of the BDB and VDF German Flyweight championships, 1925-6 ==
He took the BDB German Flyweight Championship from Friedrich Schmidt in a twelfth-round knockout on June 16, 1925, in Platz, Germany. In a defense of the title on June 18, 1926, Stein also took the VDF German National Flyweight Championship in a tenth-round knockout of Schmidt at the Radrennbahn in Treptow, Germany. He had first defeated Schmidt on August 15, 1924, in Hannover, Germany in an eighth round points decision.

Facing one of his most competitive opponents, Stein lost to 1931 Canadian World Bantamweight Champion, Norwegian-American Pete Sanstol on July 13, 1926, in a fourth-round newspaper decision at Luna Park in Halansee, Germany. According to the German publication, Jahrbuch des Deutschen Boxsport, Stansol won decisively.

He first fought for the German Bantamweight championship on May 8, 1927, against Felix Friedmann losing in a twelfth-round technical knockout at Stadion Radrennbahn, in Frankfurt, Germany. Though there was no official decision, Stansol was reported to have won decisively.

=== Relinquishing the German flyweight championship due to VDF ruling, March 1928 ===
Stein fought a German featherweight championship bout on March 1, 1928, against Eric Kohler losing in a fourth round disqualification at Ausstellungshalle, in Dresden. The exact nature of the foul that led to the disqualification is unknown. The fight was not officially considered a featherweight championship bout at the time because Stein was not within the featherweight limit at the weigh-in. Stein was forced to relinquish the title on March 17, however, when the German Boxing Federation (V.D.F.) ruled that because of the disqualification, Kohler would be adjudged the winner and take the German featherweight title. The ruling seems peculiar, since by current rules, if both boxers are not within the necessary weight class range at weigh in, no title can change hands.

==== Fighting in Paris and Belgium ====
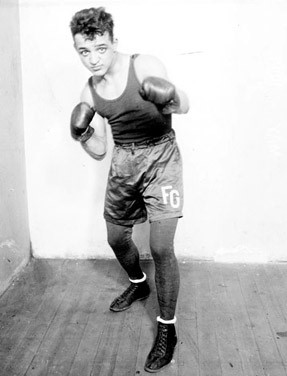
Frankie Genaro

Stein fought primarily in Paris, and Belgium, between May and December 1929, meeting quality opponents but no world champions, where he established an impressive record of 12 wins and 3 losses.

He met the incomparable reigning World Flyweight champion, Italian-American Frankie Genaro in an eighth round no decision bout on February 26, 1930, at the Sportpalast, in Schoeneberg, Germany, which he won by disqualification. In the original decision, Genaro was disqualified for a low blow in the eighth round. The German Boxing Federation (V.D.F.), however, annulled the ruling five days later, believing the referee had acted too hastily and not according to V.D.F. rules. In theory, had the bout been for the world flyweight championship, Stein could have taken the crown with a knockout or decision win.

=== Taking the German Featherweight Championship, April, 1932 ===
On April 22, 1932, in one of his most important victories, Stein won the VDF National German Featherweight Championship in a fifth-round technical knockout against Paul Noack in Spichernsaele, Germany.

He did not relinquish the German Featherweight title until March 3, 1933, in a seventh-round knockout loss to top German featherweight contender Hans Schiller. Though little is known of any extenuating circumstances concerning his loss of the title, the Nazis had come to power in January of that year, only three months prior to the championship match. By July, 1933, the Maccabee organization, which had over 40,000 Jewish athletes using their athletic clubs in Stein's future home of Poland, had relocated its world headquarters from Berlin to London.

Only months after relinquishing the German Featherweight Title, Stein was forced to flee Germany for Prague, Poland, to escape Nazi persecution in 1933, where he continued to box at least through 1937. Another top Jewish German boxer, Eric Seelig a German national middle and light heavyweight champion, had had his titles stripped by the Nazis, and had been forced to flee Germany the same year for France. Stein fought a bout in Carracas, Venezuela, on April 22, 1933, which he lost in a fifth-round knockout. One of Stein's first fights in Poland was against Tomas Berlina at Lucerna Hall on December 12, 1933, in Prague, Poland where he fought a three-round exhibition no-decision bout. He fought at Prague's Lucerna Hall through 1934, but the frequency of his bouts, the quality of his competition, and his percentage of wins diminished after he was forced to flee Germany, possibly because of advancing age, his need to find other work, or because he had less time or resources to train.

Stein appeared as himself in the 1930 film Liebe im Ring (Love in the Ring), along with the boxers Jose Santa, and handsome German heavyweight phenomenon Max Schmeling, in the lead role as a boxer.

Up until his death, he trained Russian amateur boxers, likely in the area of Moscow, where he had fled by the 1940s. The exact date of his death is unknown, but it is believed to have been prior to 1948.
