= Raymond Trève =

French boxer

Raymond Trève (25 December 1902 – 27 April 1977) was a French boxer who competed in the 1924 Summer Olympics. In 1924 he was eliminated in the second round of the flyweight class after losing his fight to Oscar Bergström.
