= Rinaldo Castellenghi =

Italian boxer (1906–1952)

Rinaldo Castellenghi (27 February 1906 – 1952) was an Italian boxer who competed in the 1924 Summer Olympics. In 1924 he finished fourth in the flyweight class. He lost in the semi-finals to the upcoming gold medalist Fidel LaBarba and was not able to compete in the bronze medal bout with Raymond Fee.

Castellenghi was born in Milan on 27 February 1906. He died in 1952.
