= Jock MacGregor =

Canadian boxer (1904–1980)

Personal information
- Nationality: Canadian
- Born: 10 July 1904 Kirkintilloch, Scotland
- Died: 28 February 1980 (aged 75) Hamilton, Ontario, Canada

Sport
- Sport: Boxing

John MacGregor (10 July 1904 – 28 February 1980) was a Canadian boxer. He competed in the men's flyweight event at the 1924 Summer Olympics.
