= Gaetano Lanzi =

Italian boxer

Medal record

Men's amateur boxing

Representing Italy

European Amateur Championships
Silver medal – second place	1927 Berlin	Bantamweight

Gaetano Lanzi (5 February 1905 in Rome – 1980) was an Italian boxer who competed in the 1924 Summer Olympics. In 1924 he was eliminated in the second round of the flyweight class after losing his fight to the eventual gold medalist Fidel LaBarba.
