= Harry Sniderman =

Canadian sports figure and businessman

Harry Sniderman was a sports figure in Toronto, Canada, who was later known as a promoter, organizer and businessman.

In 1936 the Olympics were held in Berlin, the capital of Nazi Germany, so Sniderman and several other athletes who objected to attending an event in Nazi Germany attended an alternate Olympics in Barcelona.

Sniderman was survived by his wife, Molly, who died in 2009.
