= James McKenzie (boxer) =

Scottish boxer (1903–1931)

Olympic medal record

Men's Boxing
| Silver medal – second place | 1924 Paris | Flyweight |

James McKenzie (13 August 1903 – 8 January 1931) was a Scottish boxer who competed for Great Britain in the 1924 Summer Olympics in Paris. He was the silver medalist in the flyweight division. McKenzie was defeated in the final by American Fidel LaBarba. LaBarba later became the professional world flyweight champion.

== Olympic results ==
Here are James McKenzie's results from the flyweight division of the 1924 Olympic boxing tournament:

- First Round: bye
- Round of 16: defeated Leo Turksma of the Netherlands by a third-round knockout
- Quarterfinal: defeated Jock MacGregor of Canada by decision
- Semifinal: defeated Raymond Fee of the United States by decision
- Final: lost to Fidel LaBarba of the United States by decision
