= Raymond Fee =

American boxer

Medal record

Men's boxing

Representing the United States

Olympic Games
Bronze medal – third place	1924 Paris	Flyweight

Raymond John Fee (January 12, 1903 – June 2, 1983) was an American boxer who competed in the 1924 Summer Olympics. He was born in Saint Paul, Minnesota and died in Collier County, Florida. In 1924 he won the bronze medal in the flyweight category.

== 1924 Olympic results ==
Below are the results of Raymond Fee, a flyweight boxer who competed for the United States at the 1924 Paris Olympics:

- Round of 32: bye
- Round of 16: defeated Vicente Catada (Argentina) on points
- Quarterfinal: defeated Oscar Bergstrom (Sweden) on points
- Semifinal: lost to James McKenzie (Great Britain) on points
- Bronze Medal Bout: defeated Rinaldo Castellenghi (Italy) by walkover
