= Canto Robledo =

Mexican-American boxer, trainer, and manager

Personal information
- Nickname: TNT/Nitroglicerina
- Nationality: Mexican-American
- Born: Canuto Cimental Robledo; January 19, 1913 Tyrone, New Mexico, United States
- Died: November 29, 1999 (aged 86) Glendora, California, United States

Boxing career
- Weight class: Bantamweight
- Stance: Orthodox

Boxing record
- Total fights: 44
- Wins: 29
- Win by KO: 11
- Losses: 10
- Draws: 5

Canuto Cimental Robledo (January 19, 1913 – November 29, 1999) better known as Canto “TNT” Robledo (Robleto) was a Mexican-American professional boxer, trainer, and manager. Robledo was scheduled to face world bantamweight champion Panama Al Brown in late 1932 but during a tune up fight he was left blind in both eyes. After retiring from boxing for a few years Robledo became best known as being the only licensed blind boxing trainer in the history of the sport. He trained both amateur and professional fighters by what he called his "sense of touch” technique.

== Early life ==
Canto Robledo was born Canuto Cimental Robledo on January 19, 1913. He was born in Tyrone, New Mexico a small town known for its copper mining. He is the third child of seven from Felipe and Soledad Robledo who immigrated from Cienega De Escobar, Durango Mexico during the Mexican Revolution. Canto’s father worked at the mines but in 1921 copper prices dropped thus closing the mines and eventually the town. In 1922 at the age of nine Canto & his family moved west to California to find better opportunities eventually settling in Pasadena, California.

Canto attended Grover Cleveland Elementary and Washington Jr High School, the same schools where Jackie Robinson would later attend. He was an honor student and a superb athlete winning various awards in soccer & track, at age 13 he won the city championship in tennis. After completing the 9th grade Canto dropped out of school due to financial difficulties, he would work picking oranges from the nearby orange groves. He briefly trained boxing with his father for the sake of being able to defend himself, and in 1928 at Brookside Park after a scuffle with a bully a 15-year-old Canto was discovered by local Pasadena boxing promoter Morrie Cohan.

== Boxing career ==
Robledo began his training at the Pasadena Arena which was owned and operated by his promoter Morrie Cohan. He would be trained in both the amateur and pro ranks by German Otto. After several months of rigorous training his first bout would take place at the Los Angeles Golden Gloves Boxing Tournament in 1927. The tournament was held at the Grand Olympic Auditorium, Robledo would go on to win his first bout by split decision and the remaining bouts in his weight class. After turning 16 years old he decided to turn pro and on June 29, 1929 he won his first professional fight which was held at the Main Street Athletic Club versus Johnny Gabucco.

== Personal life ==
Robledo married his longtime love Concha Jimenez in 1932, they were a couple for over 60 years until her death in 1988. They had four children: Gloria Robledo Romero, Raymond “Bobby” Robledo, Irene Robledo Tellez, and Joseph Canto Robledo.

== Professional boxing record ==
Boxing Record
| Date | Opponent | Result | Place |
|---|---|---|---|
| 1932-09-07 | Hill Hernandez | Won PTS | Civic Ice Arena, Seattle |
| 1932-08-26 | Rodolfo Teglia | Draw | Civic Ice Arena, Seattle |
| 1932-08-03 | Speedy Dado | Lost PTS | Civic Ice Arena, Seattle |
| 1932-07-27 | Speedy Dado | Draw | Civic Ice Arena, Seattle |
| 1932-05-04 | Ros Dumaguilas | Won PTS | Civic Ice Arena, Seattle |
| 1932-04-22 | Benny Gallup | Won KO | Stockton |
| 1932-03-11 | Young Tommy | Lost PTS | Dreamland Auditorium, San Francisco |
| 1932-02-12 | Young Tommy | Lost TKO | Dreamland Auditorium, San Francisco |
| 1931-12-11 | Midget Wolgast | Lost TKO | Dreamland Auditorium, San Francisco |
| 1931-12-04 | Young Sport | Won PTS | Dreamland Auditorium, San Francisco |
| 1931-11-06 | Speedy Dado | Won PTS | Dreamland Auditorium, San Francisco |
| 1931-10-01 | Bobby Mars | Won KO | Pasadena Arena, Pasadena |
| 1931-09-07 | Sid Torres | Won RTD | Pismo Beach Arena, Pismo Beach |
| 1931-08-31 | Sid Torres | Won RTD | Eastside Arena, Los Angeles |
| 1931-07-15 | Johnny Jones | Won DQ | Civic Ice Arena, Seattle |
| 1931-05-06 | Joe Calder | Won PTS | Civic Ice Arena, Seattle |
| 1931-04-29 | Abie Israel | Won DQ | Civic Ice Arena, Seattle |
| 1931-04-15 | Abie Israel | Won PTS | Civic Ice Arena, Seattle |
| 1931-03-21 | Clever Sencio | Won KO | Main Street Athletic Club, Los Angeles |
| 1931-02-07 | Tony Atizado | Won KO | Main Street Athletic Club, Los Angeles |
| 1931-01-23 | Peppy Sanchez | Won TKO | Legion Stadium, Hollywood |
| 1930-12-01 | Young Sport | Lost DQ | Orange County A.C., Santa Ana |
| 1930-10-31 | Speedy Dado | Draw | Legion Stadium, Hollywood |
| 1930-09-04 | Pete Sarmiento | Lost TKO | Pasadena Arena, Pasadena |
| 1930-08-08 | Midget Wolgast | Lost PTS | Legion Stadium, Hollywood |
| 1930-06-12 | Speedy Dado | Draw | Pasadena Arena, Pasadena |
| 1930-05-29 | Delos 'Kid' Williams | Won PTS | Pasadena Arena, Pasadena |
| 1930-05-08 | Pedro Villa | Won PTS | Pasadena Arena, Pasadena |
| 1930-04-24 | Chalky Wright | Won PTS | Pasadena Arena, Pasadena |
| 1930-04-15 | Emil Jure | Won PTS | Orange Belt A.C., San Bernardino |
| 1930-03-06 | Johnny Jordan | Lost DQ | Pasadena Arena, Pasadena |
| 1930-02-06 | Johnny Navarro | Draw | Pasadena Arena, Pasadena |
| 1930-01-16 | Johnny Navarro | Lost RTD | Pasadena Arena, Pasadena |
| 1930-01-02 | Johnny Jordan | Won TKO | Pasadena Arena, Pasadena |
| 1929-12-12 | Young Sport | Won PTS | Pasadena Arena, Pasadena |
| 1929-11-27 | Young Sport | Lost PTS | Pasadena Arena, Pasadena |
| 1929-10-31 | Jess Gabuco | Won PTS | Pasadena Arena, Pasadena |
| 1929-10-24 | Mickey Erno | Won TKO | Pasadena Arena, Pasadena |
| 1929-09-26 | Faster Manalo | Won PTS | Pasadena Arena, Pasadena |
| 1929-08-22 | Jimmy Martinez | Won PTS | Pasadena Arena, Pasadena |
| 1929-08-08 | Jimmy Martinez | Won PTS | Pasadena Arena, Pasadena |
| 1929-07-25 | Johnny Gabucco | Won PTS | Pasadena Arena, Pasadena |
| 1929-07-11 | Regino Palmini | Won PTS | Pasadena Arena, Pasadena |
| 1929-06-29 | Johnny Gabucco | Won PTS | Main Street Athletic Club, Los Angeles |

== Awards & recognitions ==
- 1950 – Orv Mohler Award by Pasadena Sports Ambassadors – Humanitarian efforts in the sport of boxing
- 1956 – Helms Athletic Foundation Award by Southern California Boxing Writers Association
- 1958 – Mirror Award by the Boxing Association – Contributions to the art & science of boxing
- 1969 – Order of Eagles Award
- 1979 – Eyewitness News on ABC – Special segment by Ines Pedroza
- 1982 – Real People television show on NBC – Season 4 Episode 22 aired March 17, 1982 – "Blind Boxing Coach" segment by Byron Allen
- 1987 – KCOP Sports Star of the Week by KCOP 13 – Honoring extraordinary abilities & his community humanitarian efforts
- 1988 – Humanitarian Award by the World Boxing Hall of Fame – Humanitarian accomplishments in and outside the ring
- 1988 – Los Angeles City Proclamation Award by L.A. County Supervisor Michael Antonovich – Efforts for his contributions to the sport of boxing and working with the youth
- 2005 – World Boxing Hall of Fame, posthumous
- 2010 – Joe Louis Humanitarian Medal Award by the California State Athletic Commission – For exemplified community affairs for the good of humanity
- 2010 – Canto Robledo Memorial plaque at Villa Park by Pasadena Mexican American History Association – Honoring his legacy in boxing and community humanitarian efforts.
- 2017 – Pasadena Sports Hall of Fame, posthumous
- 2018 – West Coast Boxing Hall of Fame, posthumous
