= Juan Zurita =

Mexican boxer

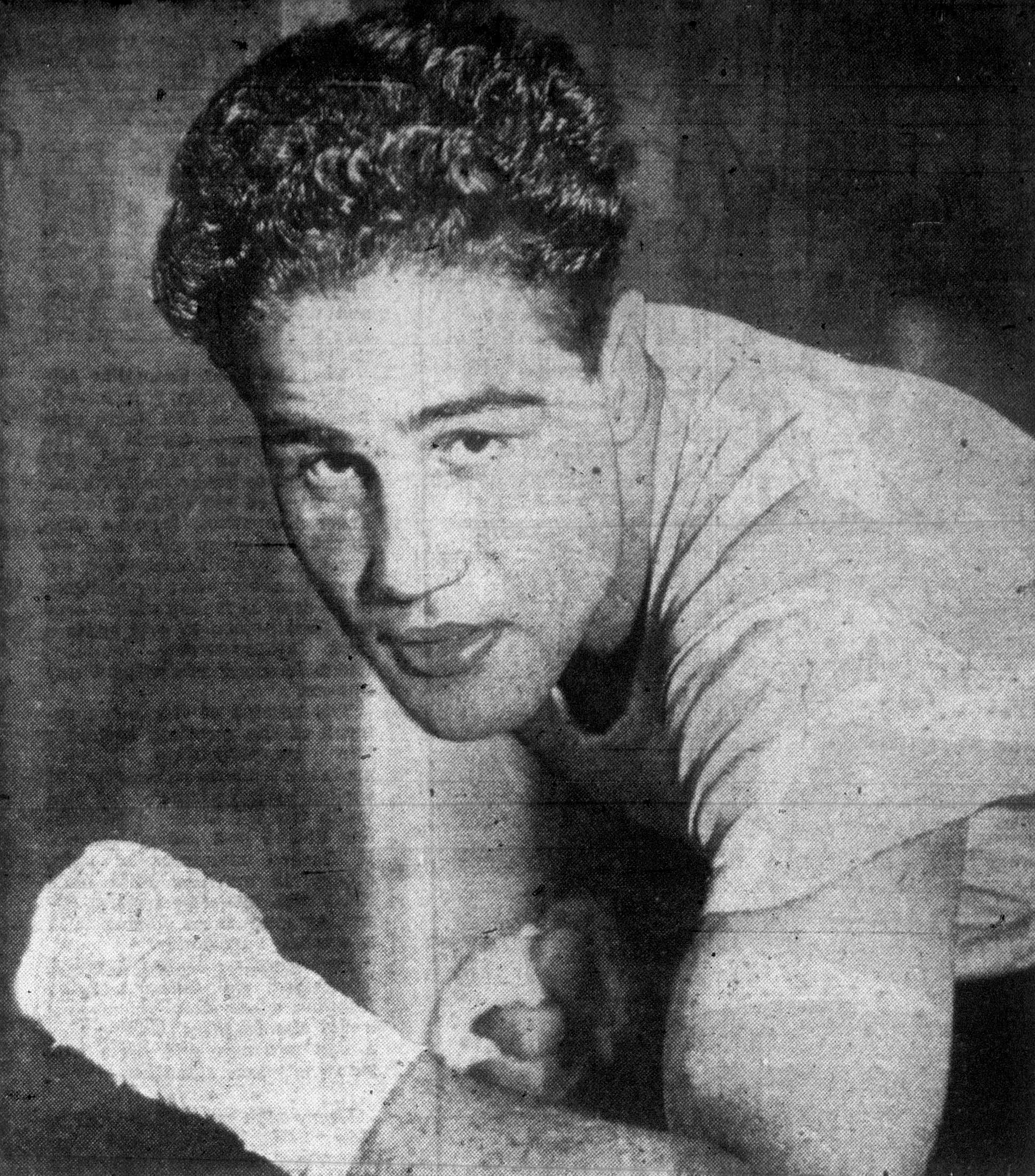
- Zurita, circa 1942

Personal information
- Nickname: Zurita III
- Nationality: (Mexico) Mexican
- Born: Juan Bautista Zurita Ferrer; May 12, 1917 Veracruz, Mexico
- Died: March 23, 2000 (aged 82) Mexico City, Mexico
- Height: 1.68 m (5 ft 6 in)
- Weight: Lightweight

Boxing career
- Reach: 1.68 m (66 in)
- Stance: Southpaw

Boxing record
- Total fights: 155
- Wins: 131
- Win by KO: 48
- Losses: 23
- Draws: 1

Juan Zurita (2 May 1917 – 24 March 2000) was a Mexican professional boxer in the lightweight division and a 1944 National Boxing Association Lightweight world champion. Zurita was a southpaw or left handed boxer, who often fought with his right foot forward, though at times he could lead with his right as well. American newspapers distinguished him as the first native-born Mexican to win a world boxing title.

== Early life and career ==
Zurita was born on May 2, 1917, near Veracruz, Mexico on the Atlantic Coast. He began fighting professionally in early 1932, at the age of 14, on the Western Mexican coast in Guadalajara, Jalisco, Mexico.

=== Taking the Featherweight Championship of Mexico, February 1934 ===
Early in his career, Zurita won the Featherweight Championship of Mexico, defeating Joe Conde on February 24, 1934, in a twelve round points decision for the title. He defeated Joe Conde again in a rematch for the Featherweight Championship on March 11, 1939, in a twelve round points decision at the Arena Mexico in Mexico City.

On January 4, 1935, Zurita defeated Pablo Dano in a ten round points decision at Legion Stadium in Hollywood, California. Zurita took four rounds, Dano three, and three were even. Zurita took the first four rounds according to the Los Angeles Times and finished strong in the final round. The win was significant for Zurita as Dano was the more experienced boxer and favored in the early betting.

On February 15, 1936, Zurita defeated Californian boxer Georgie Hansford in a fifth round knockout in Mexico City.

=== Bouts with former World Flyweight Champion Midget Wolgast, 1935–36 ===
On March 28, 1936, he defeated American boxer Midget Wolgast at the Arena Nacional in Mexico City in a fifth round knockout. Zurita sent Wolgast to the mat for a count of nine in the fifth, before finishing him shortly after for a full count with a left to the stomach and a right to the chin. On July 24, 1936, Zurita defeated Wolgast again in a ten round points decision at Legion Stadium in Hollywood, California. Zurita forced the fighting through the entire bout and had the cleaner and more effective punches. There were no knockdowns in the bout. The referee gave eight rounds to Zurita, and two to Wolgast, though Braven Dyer of the Los Angeles Times felt the fight was a bit closer. Zurita seemed strongest in the closing rounds. He had lost to Wolgast three times previously in 1935, on February 21, May 21, and June 28 in ten round points decisions, first in Los Angeles and then twice at Legion Stadium in Hollywood. Wolgast had formerly held the World Flyweight Title in July 1931, and had contended unsuccessfully for the World Bantamweight Title.

On August 18, 1936, Zurita lost to exceptional Black boxer Henry Armstrong in a fourth round knockout at Olympic Stadium in Los Angeles. At the time, Armstrong held the California version of the World Featherweight Title. Zurita probably carried the first two round on points with a furious attack. In the bottom of the third, Armstrong had found his range and made a number of effective blows to the head of Zurita that had him groggy. In his career, Armstrong would also hold the World Welterweight Championship. Zurita lost again to Armstrong on October 13, 1942, in a second round knockout at Olympic Auditorium in Los Angeles. The final blow was a right to the chin 2:20 into the second. The final blow was a left hook followed by a right cross, 2:20 into the second, and was the only knockdown in the bout. By their last bout in October 1942, Armstrong had taken world titles in both the Welterweight and Lightweight divisions.

On January 1, 1937, Zurita defeated Spanish boxer Baltasar Sangchili in a ten round points decision in Mexico City. In June 1935, Sangchili had taken the IBU World Bantamweight Title in Valencia, Spain, and had taken the World Bantamweight Championship in the same year.

Zurita defeated New York based Puerto-Rican born Koli Kolo around June 1, 1938, in a fourth round knockout in Tepic, Nayarit, Mexico. The exact date of the bout remains unknown, and may have occurred the month earlier.

On June 18, 1938, Zurita defeated talented Mexican boxer Rodolfo "Baby" Casanova in Guadalajara, Jalisco, Mexico in a sixth round Technical Knockout. It was Zurita's only win against Casanova. On August 20, 1938, Zurita would lose to Casonova in a sixth round technical knockout in Mexico City. In four earlier meetings with Casanova, in a Mexican Featherweight Title match on September 15, 1934, and in matches in April 1935, April 1936, and June 1937, Zurita would lose. Though each boxer was close in height and very close in reach, Zurita did not seem to match up well with Casanova who was two years older and may have benefited from two extra years in age. By September 1934, Casanova had taken the Mexican Featherweight Championship, and had scored seven successful defenses of the title.

== Mid-career as a professional ==
=== Taking the Mexican Lightweight Title, September 1938 ===
Zurita first took the Mexican Lightweight Title on September 10, 1938, against Joe Conde in a twelve round points decision at the Arena in Mexico City, though few if any American newspapers covered the story.

On May 15, 1939, Zurita first defeated Jimmy Hatcher in a ten round decision at the Walkathon Theater in San Antonio, Texas. He defeated Hatcher again on September 11, 1942, in a second round technical knockout at Legion Stadium in Hollywood. The bout was stopped by the referee thirty seconds into the second round after Hatcher received a long cut on his forehead. The loss ended Hatcher's string of nineteen straight wins.

On July 21, 1940, Zurita defeated Speedy Dado in a fifth round technical knockout at the Arena Progreso at Jalisco, Mexico. Dado was a talented Philippines-born boxer who would take the USA California State Bantamweight Title in October 1933, and later compete unsuccessfully for the World Bantamweight Title in May 1935.

On May 17, 1941, Zurita defeated Carlos Miranda in a third round knockout in Mexico City.

On November 14, 1941, Zurita defeated George Latka in a ten round points decision at Legion Stadium in Hollywood, California. Twice in the second and once in the tenth Zurita scored against Latka with strong blows. Zurita started on the aggressive, and though the middle rounds were close, Zurita probably always led in points.

On July 24, 1942, Zurita defeated Richie Lemos at Hollywood's Legion Stadium in a ten round points decision. Lemos went to his corner groggy at the end of the third and fifth rounds, and may have taken eight rounds. Paul Lowry of the Los Angeles Times gave Zurita every round. Zurita skillfully evaded the blows of Lemos with cunning, and landed left hooks to the body and rights and lefts to the head of Lemos throughout the bout.

On August 19, 1942, Zurita defeated Black boxer Henry Woods in a ten round points decision at the Auditorium in Oakland, California. Woods was down for a nine count in the third round from a powerful left to the body by Zurita. Ringsiders gave Zurita seven of the ten rounds. Woods held his own in the fourth and fifth, but Zurita finished strong in the final rounds.

== Taking the NBA World Lightweight Title, March 8, 1944 ==
Zurita won the NBA World Lightweight Title on March 8, 1944, against Sammy Angott in a fifteen round unanimous decision at Gilmore Field, the Hollywood Ball Park, in Los Angeles, California. Zurita became the first Mexican to win the World Lightweight Championship in a bit of an upset victory that saw Angott as a 4 to 1 favorite. It was Angott's first loss in the lightweight class. Zurita skillfully blocked Angott's left hooks and uppercuts and scored with counter punches to the body, though Angott appeared tired and haggard from having to make the lightweight limit. Angott won only the first round when Zurita appeared puzzled by his style, but the remaining fourteen rounds went to Zurita by a comfortable and decisive margin. The crowd of 11,300 was not pleased by what they viewed as a somewhat lackluster performance, though Zurita held his edge throughout the bout. Angott, perhaps as a result of his fatigue, was off on his timing, and had trouble landing solid punches. Angott's future in the ring was questionable after the loss.

=== Loss in non-title bout with Beau Jack, March 31, 1944 ===
Immediately after taking the World Lightweight Title, Zurita lost to the great American Black boxer Beau Jack on March 31, 1944, at New York's Madison Square Garden in a ten round points decision. The great promoter Mike Jacobs signed Zurita to the bout, which must have been a financial success. Zurita faded after the fifth round, and was given only three rounds to seven for Jack by the United Press. The Mexican champion looked strong in the tenth, and took the round. There was a capacity crowd of 17,593 fans to watch the bout who were hoping for more action in the early rounds. Jack, a popular favorite, held the NYSAC Lightweight Championship at the time of the bout, which may have accounted for the size of the crowd.

==== Win over Pete Lello after seven month break from boxing, October 1944 ====
On October 6, 1944, Zurita defeated Pete Lello in a second round knockout at the Arena Coliseo in Mexico City. Atypically the blow that ended the fight was a terrific uppercut to the body of Lello in the opening seconds of the second round. A crowd of 20,000 saw the bout in the bullring. The bout was Zurita's first after a seven month layoff from boxing to recover from accidentally shooting himself in the hand around June.

On October 18, 1944, Zurita knocked out Aldo Spoldi, European Lightweight Champion, in the fourth round at Municipal Auditorium in San Antonio, Texas. In the main event before a crowd of 5000, a hard right to the face put Spoldi down for a count of nine. After arising, Zurita put Spoldi down for the full count.

=== Losing the NBA Lightweight World Championship against Ike Williams, April 1945 ===
Zurita lost the NBA World Lightweight Championship before a crowd of 35,000 by a second round knockout from Black New Jersey boxer Ike Williams in Mexico City on April 18, 1945. Their first planned meeting in Philadelphia had to be cancelled by the Pennsylvania Boxing Commission who recognized Bob Montgomery as the lightweight champion. Williams made a two fisted attack to the head of Zurita in the second which Zurita could not hold off, though he had made an effective defense in the first round. It was Zurita's first title defense. Shortly after Zurita was counted out, Williams' corner was crowded by fans, and several policeman were required to clear the ring before Williams could return to his dressing room.

Zurita defeated Mike Belloise on January 31, 1945, in a third round technical decision, when Belloise failed to come out at the opening of the fourth round. Zurita had floored the former World Featherweight Champion at the end of the third round with a right to the mid-section, but the bell sounded before a count could be completed.

Zurita died on Thursday, March 23, 2000, in Mexico City after being in a coma for several days. He was 82.

Zurita was inducted into the World Boxing Hall of Fame in 1997.

== Professional boxing record ==
155 fights	131 wins	23 losses
By knockout	48	9
By decision	82	14
By disqualification	1	0
Draws	1	

No.	Result	Record	Opponent	Type	Round	Date	Location	Notes
155	Win	131–23–1	Canguro Varela	KO	3 (?)	Mar 30, 1948	Arena Sonora, Hermosillo, Sonora, Mexico	
154	Loss	130–23–1	Ike Williams	TKO	2 (15)	Apr 18, 1945	El Toreo de Cuatro Caminos, Mexico City, Distrito Federal, Mexico	Lost NBA lightweight title
153	Win	130–22–1	Mike Belloise	RTD	3 (10)	Jan 31, 1945	Houston, Texas, U.S.	
152	Win	129–22–1	Paul Altman	KO	5 (10)	Jan 23, 1945	Municipal Auditorium, San Antonio, Texas, U.S.	
151	Win	128–22–1	Jerry Moore	KO	6 (10)	Nov 17, 1944	Civic Auditorium, San Francisco, California, U.S.	
150	Win	127–22–1	Aldo Spoldi	KO	4 (10)	Oct 17, 1944	Municipal Auditorium, San Antonio, Texas, U.S.	
149	Win	126–22–1	Pete Lello	KO	2 (10)	Oct 6, 1944	Arena Coliseo, Mexico City, Distrito Federal, Mexico	
148	Loss	125–22–1	Beau Jack	UD	10	Mar 31, 1944	Madison Square Garden, New York City, New York, U.S.	
147	Win	125–21–1	Sammy Angott	UD	15	Mar 8, 1944	Gilmore Field, Los Angeles, California, U.S.	Won NBA lightweight title
146	Win	124–21–1	Miguel Arroya	KO	5 (10)	Dec 30, 1943	Coliseo Olímpico, Guadalajara, Jalisco, Mexico	
145	Win	123–21–1	Enrique Cardoso	PTS	10	Dec 11, 1943	Estadio Olimpico, Panama City, Panama	
144	Win	122–21–1	Baby Coullimber	PTS	10	Dec 7, 1943	Estadio Olimpico, Panama City, Panama	
143	Win	121–21–1	Aquilino Allen	PTS	10	Oct 24, 1943	Estadio Olimpico, Panama City, Panama	
142	Win	120–21–1	Rafael Hurtado	PTS	10	Sep 26, 1943	Estadio Olimpico, Panama City, Panama	
141	Loss	119–21–1	Slugger White	UD	10	Jun 15, 1943	Olympic Auditorium, Los Angeles, California, U.S.	
140	Win	119–20–1	Henry Vasquez	UD	10	May 21, 1943	Legion Stadium, Hollywood, California, U.S.	
139	Win	118–20–1	Joey Silva	PTS	10	Apr 30, 1943	Last Frontier Hotel, Las Vegas, Nevada, U.S.	
138	Win	117–20–1	Joey Peralta	PTS	10	Mar 19, 1943	Legion Stadium, Hollywood, California, U.S.	
137	Win	116–20–1	Jimmy Florita	PTS	10	Feb 22, 1943	Civic Auditorium, Stockton, California, U.S.	
136	Win	115–20–1	Vern Bybee	PTS	10	Feb 8, 1943	Civic Auditorium, San Francisco, California, U.S.	
135	Win	114–20–1	Eddie Marcus	KO	6 (10)	Jan 22, 1943	Legion Stadium, Hollywood, California, U.S.	
134	Win	113–20–1	Chuck Railey	TKO	3 (10)	Dec 4, 1942	Coliseum, San Diego, California, U.S.	
133	Win	112–20–1	Chester Slider	UD	10	Nov 27, 1942	Legion Stadium, Hollywood, California, U.S.	
132	Win	111–20–1	Panama Brown	KO	4 (10)	Nov 2, 1942	Coliseo Olímpico, Guadalajara, Jalisco, Mexico	
131	Loss	110–20–1	Henry Armstrong	KO	2 (10)	Oct 13, 1942	Legion Stadium, Hollywood, California, U.S.	
130	Win	110–19–1	Jimmy Hatcher	TKO	2 (10)	Sep 11, 1942	Legion Stadium, Hollywood, California, U.S.	
129	Win	109–19–1	Chester Slider	PTS	10	Sep 2, 1942	Auditorium, Oakland, California, U.S.	
128	Win	108–19–1	Henry Woods	PTS	10	Aug 19, 1942	Auditorium, Oakland, California, U.S.	
127	Win	107–19–1	Richie Lemos	UD	10	Jul 24, 1942	Legion Stadium, Hollywood, California, U.S.	
126	Win	106–19–1	Fillo Gonzalez	TKO	4 (10)	May 30, 1942	Plaza de Toros, Tijuana, Baja California, Mexico	
125	Win	105–19–1	Quentin Breese	UD	10	May 15, 1942	Legion Stadium, Hollywood, California, U.S.	
124	Win	104–19–1	Jimmy Florita	KO	5 (10)	Apr 7, 1942	Olympic Auditorium, Los Angeles, California, U.S.	
123	Win	103–19–1	Ray Price	PTS	10	Mar 13, 1942	Legion Stadium, Hollywood, California, U.S.	
122	Win	102–19–1	Billy Hale	KO	3 (10)	Dec 12, 1941	Coliseum, San Diego, California, U.S.	
121	Win	101–19–1	Guy Serean	KO	1 (10)	Dec 5, 1941	Legion Stadium, Hollywood, California, U.S.	
120	Win	100–19–1	George Latka	PTS	10	Nov 14, 1941	Legion Stadium, Hollywood, California, U.S.	
119	Win	99–19–1	Fillo Gonzalez	PTS	10	Sep 13, 1941	Arena Cristal, Havana, Cuba	
118	Win	98–19–1	Joe Pedroso	PTS	10	Aug 2, 1941	Arena Cristal, Havana, Cuba	
117	Win	97–19–1	Mario Baeza	KO	6 (10)	Jul 19, 1941	Arena Cristal, Havana, Cuba	
116	Win	96–19–1	Baby Coullimber	PTS	10	Jun 28, 1941	Arena Cristal, Havana, Cuba	
115	Win	95–19–1	Ventura Marquez	KO	3 (10)	May 31, 1941	Arena Nacional, Mexico City, Distrito Federal, Mexico	
114	Win	94–19–1	Carlos Miranda	KO	3 (10)	May 17, 1941	Arena Nacional, Mexico City, Distrito Federal, Mexico	
113	Loss	93–19–1	Raul de la Torre	KO	1 (10)	Apr 26, 1941	Arena Nacional, Mexico City, Distrito Federal, Mexico	
112	Win	93–18–1	Lloyd Pine	PTS	10	Apr 8, 1941	Municipal Auditorium, San Antonio, Texas, U.S.	
111	Win	92–18–1	Enrique Cardoso	PTS	10	Mar 22, 1941	Arena Nacional, Mexico City, Distrito Federal, Mexico	
110	Win	91–18–1	Lupe Gonzalez	PTS	10	Feb 15, 1941	Coliseo Olímpico, Guadalajara, Jalisco, Mexico	
109	Win	90–18–1	Nick Peters	PTS	10	Dec 13, 1940	Municipal Auditorium, San Antonio, Texas, U.S.	
108	Loss	89–18–1	Memo Llanes	PTS	10	Nov 30, 1940	Arena Nacional, Mexico City, Distrito Federal, Mexico	
107	Win	89–17–1	Fred Taylor	PTS	10	Nov 16, 1940	Arena Nacional, Mexico City, Distrito Federal, Mexico	
106	Win	88–17–1	Lupe Gonzalez	PTS	10	Nov 9, 1940	Arena Nacional, Mexico City, Distrito Federal, Mexico	
105	Loss	87–17–1	Rodolfo Ramirez	PTS	12	Oct 26, 1940	Arena Nacional, Mexico City, Distrito Federal, Mexico	For Mexico lightweight title
104	Win	87–16–1	Carlos Manzano	KO	1 (10)	Sep 10, 1940	Plaza de Toros, Nuevo Laredo, Tamaulipas, Mexico	
103	Win	86–16–1	Carlos Manzano	KO	1 (10)	Sep 10, 1940	Plaza de Toros, Nuevo Laredo, Tamaulipas, Mexico	
102	Win	85–16–1	Fred Taylor	PTS	10	Aug 14, 1940	Arena La Cancha, Torreon, Coahuila de Zaragoza, Mexico	
101	Win	84–16–1	Speedy Dado	TKO	5 (10)	Jul 21, 1940	Arena Progreso, Guadalajara, Jalisco, Mexico	
100	Win	83–16–1	Max Tarley	KO	4 (10)	Jun 1, 1940	Arena Nacional, Mexico City, Distrito Federal, Mexico	
99	Win	82–16–1	Johnny Stevens	PTS	10	May 2, 1940	Palacio de los Deportes, Mexico City, Distrito Federal, Mexico	
98	Loss	81–16–1	Rodolfo Ramirez	TKO	12 (12)	Dec 16, 1939	Arena Mexico, Mexico City, Distrito Federal, Mexico	Lost Mexico lightweight title
97	Win	81–15–1	Joe Conde	PTS	10	Nov 26, 1939	Nogales, Sonora, Mexico	
96	Win	80–15–1	Tony Mar	PTS	10	Oct 11, 1939	Nogales, Sonora, Mexico	
95	Loss	79–15–1	Rodolfo Ramirez	KO	6 (10)	Sep 2, 1939	Arena Mexico, Mexico City, Distrito Federal, Mexico	
94	Win	79–14–1	Carlos Malacara	DQ	4 (10)	Aug 12, 1939	Mexico City, Distrito Federal, Mexico	
93	Win	78–14–1	Tony Mar	PTS	12	Jul 21, 1939	Arena Mexico, Mexico City, Distrito Federal, Mexico	Retained Mexico lightweight title
92	Win	77–14–1	Kallo Alphesa	TKO	5 (10)	May 23, 1939	Walkathon Arena, San Antonio, Texas, U.S.	
91	Win	76–14–1	Jimmy Hatcher	UD	10	May 15, 1939	Walkathon Arena, San Antonio, Texas, U.S.	
90	Win	75–14–1	Tony Mar	PTS	12	May 1, 1939	Arena Mexico, Mexico City, Mexico	Retained Mexico lightweight title
89	Win	74–14–1	Joe Conde	PTS	12	Mar 11, 1939	Arena Mexico, Mexico City, Mexico	Retained Mexico lightweight title
88	Win	73–14–1	Tiburcio De La Rosa	KO	7 (10)	Feb 11, 1939	Arena Mexico, Mexico City, Mexico	
87	Loss	72–14–1	Carlos Malacara	PTS	10	Jan 28, 1939	Arena Mexico, Mexico City, Mexico	
86	Draw	72–13–1	Tony Mar	PTS	10	Dec 3, 1938	Arena Mexico, Mexico City, Mexico	
85	Win	72–13	Panchito Villa	PTS	10	Nov 5, 1938	Arena Mexico, Mexico City, Mexico	
84	Win	71–13	Joe Conde	PTS	12	Sep 10, 1938	Arena Mexico, Mexico City, Mexico	Won vacant Mexico lightweight title
83	Loss	70–13	Rodolfo Casanova	TKO	6 (10)	Aug 20, 1938	Arena Mexico, Mexico City, Mexico	
82	Win	70–12	Felipe Andrade	KO	1 (10)	Jul 9, 1938	Arena Nacional, Mexico City, Distrito Federal, Mexico	
81	Win	69–12	Rodolfo Casanova	KO	6 (10)	Jun 18, 1938	Arena Nacional, Mexico City, Distrito Federal, Mexico	
80	Win	68–12	Joe Conde	PTS	10	Jun 4, 1938	Arena Nacional, Mexico City, Distrito Federal, Mexico	
79	Win	67–12	Salvador Cecena	KO	4 (10)	Jun 1, 1938	Tepic, Nayarit, Mexico	Date unknown
78	Win	66–12	Lupe Gonzalez	PTS	10	May 14, 1938	Arena Mexico, Mexico City, Distrito Federal, Mexico	
77	Win	65–12	Ricardo Manzanillo	PTS	10	May 7, 1938	Arena Mexico, Mexico City, Distrito Federal, Mexico	
76	Win	64–12	Joe Conde	PTS	10	May 2, 1938	Leon, Guanajuato, Mexico	
75	Loss	63–12	Emilio Magana	PTS	10	Feb 19, 1938	Arena Mexico, Mexico City, Distrito Federal, Mexico	
74	Win	63–11	Joe Conde	PTS	10	Jan 15, 1938	El Toreo de Cuatro Caminos, Mexico City, Distrito Federal, Mexico	
73	Win	62–11	Nava Esparza	KO	4 (10)	Dec 12, 1937	Xalapa, Veracruz, Mexico	
72	Win	61–11	Pelon Guerra	KO	6 (10)	Dec 4, 1937	Xalapa, Veracruz, Mexico	
71	Win	60–11	Joe Conde	PTS	10	Nov 27, 1937	Monterrey, Nuevo León, Mexico	
70	Win	59–11	Sebastian Gonzalez	KO	5 (10)	Oct 9, 1937	Monterrey, Nuevo León, Mexico	
69	Win	58–11	Enrique Rodea	PTS	10	Jul 31, 1937	Arena Nacional, Mexico City, Distrito Federal, Mexico	
68	Win	57–11	Joe Conde	PTS	10	Jul 10, 1937	Monterrey, Nuevo León, Mexico	
67	Loss	56–11	Rodolfo Casanova	TKO	10 (10)	Jun 26, 1937	Arena Nacional, Mexico City, Distrito Federal, Mexico	
66	Win	56–10	Panchon Martinez	KO	1 (10)	Jun 12, 1937	Arena Nacional, Mexico City, Distrito Federal, Mexico	
65	Win	55–10	Manuel Villa I	PTS	10	May 8, 1937	Arena Nacional, Mexico City, Distrito Federal, Mexico	
64	Win	54–10	Cleo McNeal	PTS	10	Apr 3, 1937	Arena Nacional, Mexico City, Distrito Federal, Mexico	
63	Win	53–10	Panchito Villa	PTS	10	Mar 21, 1937	Monterrey, Nuevo León, Mexico	
62	Win	52–10	Pedro Ortega	PTS	10	Feb 6, 1937	Arena Nacional, Mexico City, Distrito Federal, Mexico	
61	Win	51–10	Ricardo Manzanillo	PTS	10	Jan 30, 1937	Arena Jalisco, Guadalajara, Jalisco, Mexico	
60	Win	50–10	Joe Conde	PTS	10	Jan 16, 1937	Arena Nacional, Mexico City, Distrito Federal, Mexico	
59	Win	49–10	Lalo Mendoza	PTS	10	Jan 10, 1937	Pachuca, Hidalgo, Mexico	
58	Win	48–10	Baltasar Sangchili	PTS	10	Jan 1, 1937	El Toreo de Cuatro Caminos, Mexico City, Distrito Federal, Mexico	
57	Win	47–10	Joe Lucero	TKO	4 (10)	Oct 7, 1936	Labor Temple, Tucson, Arizona, U.S.	
56	Win	46–10	Tommy Brown	KO	2 (10)	Oct 5, 1936	Ajo, Arizona, U.S.	
55	Win	45–10	Ricardo Manzanillo	KO	5 (10)	Sep 21, 1936	Arena Jalisco, Guadalajara, Jalisco, Mexico	
54	Loss	44–10	Henry Armstrong	KO	4 (10)	Aug 18, 1936	Olympic Auditorium, Los Angeles, California, U.S.	
53	Win	44–9	Juan Cervantes	PTS	10	Aug 16, 1936	Leon, Guanajuato, Mexico	Exact date unknown
52	Win	43–9	Midget Wolgast	PTS	10	Jul 24, 1936	Legion Stadium, Hollywood, California, U.S.	
51	Win	42–9	Paco Villa	TKO	6 (10)	Jul 17, 1936	Arena Nacional, Mexico City, Distrito Federal, Mexico	
50	Win	41–9	Ricardo Manzanillo	PTS	10	Jun 25, 1936	Leon, Guanajuato, Mexico	
49	Win	40–9	Chico Cisneros	PTS	10	May 17, 1936	Guadalajara, Jalisco, Mexico	
48	Loss	39–9	Rodolfo Casanova	PTS	10	Apr 25, 1936	Arena Nacional, Mexico City, Distrito Federal, Mexico	
47	Win	39–8	Kid Barrilito	KO	4 (10)	Apr 12, 1936	Tampico, Tamaulipas, Mexico	
46	Win	38–8	Midget Wolgast	KO	5 (10)	Mar 28, 1936	Arena Nacional, Mexico City, Distrito Federal, Mexico	
45	Win	37–8	Georgie Hansford	TKO	5 (10)	Feb 15, 1936	Arena Nacional, Mexico City, Distrito Federal, Mexico	
44	Win	36–8	Joey Dodge	KO	6 (10)	Jan 1, 1936	El Toreo de Cuatro Caminos, Mexico City, Distrito Federal, Mexico	
43	Win	35–8	Joseph Decico	UD	10	Sep 18, 1935	Forum, Montreal, Quebec, Canada	
42	Win	34–8	Bobby Fernandez	PTS	10	Aug 7, 1935	El Paso, Texas, U.S.	
41	Win	33–8	Georgie Hawks	KO	2 (10)	Jul 16, 1935	Laredo, Texas, U.S.	
40	Loss	32–8	Midget Wolgast	PTS	10	Jun 28, 1935	Legion Stadium, Hollywood, California, U.S.	
39	Win	32–7	Bobby Fernandez	TKO	5 (10)	Jun 19, 1935	Arena Panamericana, Ciudad Juarez, Chihuahua, Mexico	
38	Loss	31–7	Midget Wolgast	PTS	10	May 31, 1935	Legion Stadium, Hollywood, California, U.S.	
37	Loss	31–6	Rodolfo Casanova	PTS	10	Apr 27, 1935	Arena Nacional, Mexico City, Distrito Federal, Mexico	
36	Win	31–5	Sixto Escobar	PTS	10	Mar 31, 1935	El Toreo de Cuatro Caminos, Mexico City, Distrito Federal, Mexico	
35	Loss	30–5	Midget Wolgast	PTS	10	Feb 21, 1935	Wrigley Field, Los Angeles, California, U.S.	
34	Win	30–4	Gene Espinosa	PTS	10	Jan 18, 1935	Legion Stadium, Hollywood, California, U.S.	
33	Win	29–4	Pablo Dano	UD	10	Jan 4, 1935	Legion Stadium, Hollywood, California, U.S.	
32	Win	28–4	Chico Cisneros	PTS	10	Nov 25, 1934	Arena Jalisco, Guadalajara, Jalisco, Mexico	
31	Win	27–4	Chico Cisneros	PTS	10	Nov 4, 1934	Arena Nacional, Mexico City, Distrito Federal, Mexico	
30	Loss	26–4	Rodolfo Casanova	KO	12 (12)	Sep 15, 1934	Arena Nacional, Mexico City, Distrito Federal, Mexico	Lost Mexico featherweight title
29	Win	26–3	Gene Espinosa	PTS	10	Aug 11, 1934	Arena Nacional, Mexico City, Distrito Federal, Mexico	
28	Win	25–3	Joe Conde	PTS	10	Jul 7, 1934	Arena Nacional, Mexico City, Distrito Federal, Mexico	
27	Win	24–3	Pelon Guerra	TKO	6 (10)	Jul 1, 1934	Arena Cine Royal, Guadalajara, Jalisco, Mexico	
26	Win	23–3	Ricardo Manzanillo	PTS	12	Jun 16, 1934	Arena Nacional, Mexico City, Distrito Federal, Mexico	Retained Mexico featherweight title
25	Win	22–3	Cris Pineda	KO	4 (10)	May 19, 1934	Arena Nacional, Mexico City, Distrito Federal, Mexico	
24	Win	21–3	Eddie Trujillo	PTS	10	Apr 7, 1934	Arena Nacional, Mexico City, Distrito Federal, Mexico	
23	Win	20–3	Eddie Ruiz	KO	4 (10)	Mar 19, 1934	Plaza de Toros Rea, Mazatlan, Sinaloa, Mexico	
22	Win	19–3	Carlos Ibarra	PTS	10	Mar 10, 1934	Arena Cine Royal, Guadalajara, Jalisco, Mexico	
21	Win	18–3	Joe Conde	PTS	12	Feb 24, 1934	Arena Nacional, Mexico City, Distrito Federal, Mexico	Won vacant Mexico featherweight title
20	Loss	17–3	Joe Conde	PTS	10	Feb 3, 1934	Arena Nacional, Mexico City, Distrito Federal, Mexico	
19	Win	17–2	Ricardo Manzanillo	PTS	10	Jan 27, 1934	Arena Nacional, Mexico City, Distrito Federal, Mexico	
18	Loss	16–2	Cris Pineda	PTS	10	Dec 9, 1933	Arena Nacional, Mexico City, Distrito Federal, Mexico	
17	Win	16–1	Pelon Guerra	PTS	10	Nov 25, 1933	Arena Nacional, Mexico City, Distrito Federal, Mexico	
16	Win	15–1	Baby Palmore	PTS	10	Nov 4, 1933	Arena Nacional, Mexico City, Distrito Federal, Mexico	
15	Win	14–1	Baby Nationalista	KO	3 (10)	Oct 21, 1933	Arena Nacional, Mexico City, Distrito Federal, Mexico	
14	Win	13–1	Harry Fierro	PTS	10	Sep 23, 1933	Arena Nacional, Mexico City, Distrito Federal, Mexico	
13	Win	12–1	Pancho Varela	PTS	10	Sep 9, 1933	Arena Nacional, Mexico City, Distrito Federal, Mexico	
12	Win	11–1	Sabino Tirado	PTS	10	Jul 29, 1933	Arena Nacional, Mexico City, Distrito Federal, Mexico	
11	Win	10–1	Juan Rivero	PTS	10	Jul 1, 1933	Arena Nacional, Mexico City, Distrito Federal, Mexico	
10	Loss	9–1	Carlos Ibarra	PTS	10	May 27, 1933	Arena Nacional, Mexico City, Distrito Federal, Mexico	
9	Win	9–0	Guillermo Saucedo	KO	2 (6)	May 20, 1933	Arena Nacional, Mexico City, Distrito Federal, Mexico	
8	Win	8–0	Justo Jimenez	PTS	6	May 6, 1933	Arena Nacional, Mexico City, Distrito Federal, Mexico	
7	Win	7–0	Paco Villa	PTS	6	Apr 22, 1933	Arena Nacional, Mexico City, Distrito Federal, Mexico	
6	Win	6–0	Felix Perez	PTS	4	Apr 2, 1933	El Toreo de Cuatro Caminos, Mexico City, Distrito Federal, Mexico	
5	Win	5–0	Rodolfo Camacho	TKO	1 (6)	Mar 18, 1933	El Toreo de Cuatro Caminos, Mexico City, Distrito Federal, Mexico	
4	Win	4–0	Rafael Casanova	KO	2 (10)	Feb 19, 1933	Arena Progreso, Guadalajara, Jalisco, Mexico	
3	Win	3–0	Juan Sandoval	PTS	6	Feb 11, 1933	Arena Colon, Guadalajara, Jalisco, Mexico	
2	Win	2–0	Eddie Kidd	PTS	10	Dec 14, 1932	Guadalajara, Jalisco, Mexico	
1	Win	1–0	Kid Nacho	PTS	6	Feb 13, 1932	Arena Progreso, Guadalajara, Jalisco, Mexico	

== See also ==
- List of Mexican boxing world champions
- List of lightweight boxing champions

Achievements
Preceded by Sammy Angott	NBA lightweight champion March 8, 1944 – April 18, 1945	Succeeded by Ike Williams
