= Midget Wolgast =

American boxer

Personal information
- Nickname: Midget Wolgast
- Nationality: American
- Born: Joseph Robert Loscalzo; July 18, 1910 Philadelphia, Pennsylvania, U.S.
- Died: October 19, 1955 (aged 45) Philadelphia, Pennsylvania, U.S.
- Height: 5 ft 3 1/2 in (1.61 m)
- Weight: Flyweight

Boxing career
- Stance: Orthodox

Boxing record
- Total fights: 217; With the inclusion of newspaper decisions
- Wins: 164
- Win by KO: 17
- Losses: 37
- Draws: 15
- No contests: 1

Joseph Robert Loscalzo (July 18, 1910 – October 19, 1955), known professionally as Midget Wolgast, was a world flyweight boxing champion.

== Biography ==
Wolgast turned pro in 1925 and was considered one of the fastest boxers of all time. In 1930, he defeated Black Bill for the vacant New York State Athletic Commission world flyweight title. The Ring Magazine founder Nat Fleischer, Statistical boxing website BoxRec, and the International Boxing Research Organization all rate Wolgast as the 8th greatest flyweight of all-time.

He was elected to the International Boxing Hall of Fame and the Helms Boxing Hall of Fame.

Wolgast fought future NYSAC Bantamweight Champion Tony Marino for the first time on June 6, 1932, at the Myers Bowl in North Braddock, Pennsylvania, winning in a ten-round points decision.

== Professional boxing record ==
All information in this section is derived from BoxRec, unless otherwise stated.

=== Official Record ===
217 fights	144 wins	36 losses
By knockout	17	6
By decision	127	30
Draws	15	
No contests	1	
Newspaper decisions/draws	21	

All newspaper decisions are officially regarded as “no decision” bouts and are not counted in the win/loss/draw column.

No.	Result	Record	Opponent	Type	Round	Date	Age	Location	Notes
217	Loss	144–36–15 (22)	Billy Morris	PTS	6	Mar 14, 1940	29 years, 240 days	State Armory, Lancaster, Pennsylvania, U.S.	
216	Win	144–35–15 (22)	Tony Maglione	KO	1 (8)	Sep 6, 1939	29 years, 50 days	St. Ann's Open Air Arena, Bristol, Pennsylvania, U.S.	
215	Loss	143–35–15 (22)	Billy Mims	TKO	5 (8)	Jul 18, 1939	29 years, 0 days	Cambria Stadium, Philadelphia, Pennsylvania, U.S.	
214	Loss	143–34–15 (22)	Mayon Padlo	RTD	3 (8)	Mar 3, 1939	28 years, 228 days	Cambria A.C., Philadelphia, Pennsylvania, U.S.	
213	Loss	143–33–15 (22)	Teddy Baldwin	PTS	8	Feb 9, 1939	28 years, 206 days	Olympia A.C., Philadelphia, Pennsylvania, U.S.	
212	Loss	143–32–15 (22)	Teddy Baldwin	SD	8	Jan 19, 1939	28 years, 185 days	Olympia A.C., Philadelphia, Pennsylvania, U.S.	
211	Loss	143–31–15 (22)	Johnny Craven	TKO	1 (10)	Jun 16, 1938	27 years, 333 days	L.A.M. Stadium, Norristown, Pennsylvania, U.S.	Wolgast's arm was broken when he landed a left hook
210	Loss	143–30–15 (22)	Eddie Dolan	PTS	10	Mar 4, 1938	27 years, 229 days	Cambria A.C., Philadelphia, Pennsylvania, U.S.	
209	Loss	143–29–15 (22)	Lew Massey	PTS	10	Feb 3, 1938	27 years, 200 days	Olympia A.C., Philadelphia, Pennsylvania, U.S.	
208	Win	143–28–15 (22)	Norment Quarles	PTS	9	Jan 6, 1938	27 years, 172 days	Olympia A.C., Philadelphia, Pennsylvania, U.S.	The nine rounds were agreed upon as a compromise
207	Loss	142–28–15 (22)	Tommy Cross	PTS	10	Nov 4, 1937	27 years, 109 days	Olympia A.C., Philadelphia, Pennsylvania, U.S.	
206	Win	142–27–15 (22)	George Daly	UD	10	Oct 15, 1937	27 years, 89 days	Cambria A.C., Philadelphia, Pennsylvania, U.S.	
205	Loss	141–27–15 (22)	Maxie Berger	PTS	8	Jul 6, 1937	26 years, 353 days	Coney Island Velodrome, Brooklyn, New York City, New York, U.S.	
204	Loss	141–26–15 (22)	Lew Feldman	PTS	10	Jun 25, 1937	26 years, 342 days	Long Beach Stadium, Long Beach, California, U.S.	
203	Draw	141–25–15 (22)	Dick Welsh	PTS	10	Jun 16, 1937	26 years, 333 days	City Stadium, Richmond, Virginia, U.S.	
202	Loss	141–25–14 (22)	Tommy Cross	MD	10	May 13, 1937	26 years, 299 days	Olympia A.C., Philadelphia, Pennsylvania, U.S.	
201	Win	141–24–14 (22)	Tommy Cross	PTS	10	Feb 25, 1937	26 years, 222 days	Olympia A.C., Philadelphia, Pennsylvania, U.S.	
200	Win	140–24–14 (22)	Johnny Hutchinson	PTS	10	Feb 4, 1937	26 years, 201 days	Olympia A.C., Philadelphia, Pennsylvania, U.S.	
199	Draw	139–24–14 (22)	Norment Quarles	PTS	10	Dec 15, 1936	26 years, 150 days	Municipal Auditorium, Norfolk, Virginia, U.S.	
198	Loss	139–24–13 (22)	Davey Abad	PTS	10	Dec 3, 1936	26 years, 138 days	Municipal Auditorium, Saint Louis, California, U.S.	
197	Loss	139–23–13 (22)	Everette Rightmire	PTS	10	Nov 17, 1936	26 years, 122 days	Municipal Auditorium, Saint Louis, California, U.S.	
196	Loss	139–22–13 (22)	Perfecto Lopez	PTS	10	Oct 19, 1936	26 years, 93 days	Eastside Arena, Los Angeles, California, U.S.	
195	Loss	139–21–13 (22)	Perfecto Lopez	PTS	10	Sep 28, 1936	26 years, 72 days	Eastside Arena, Los Angeles, California, U.S.	
194	Win	139–20–13 (22)	Abie Israel	PTS	8	Aug 18, 1936	26 years, 31 days	Olympic Auditorium, Los Angeles, California, U.S.	
193	Loss	138–20–13 (22)	Juan Zurita	PTS	10	Jul 24, 1936	26 years, 6 days	Legion Stadium, Hollywood, California, U.S.	
192	Draw	138–19–13 (22)	Davey Abad	PTS	8	Jun 26, 1936	25 years, 344 days	Ventura A.C., Ventura, California, U.S.	
191	Win	138–19–12 (22)	Varias Milling	PTS	10	Jun 5, 1936	25 years, 323 days	Legion Stadium, Hollywood, California, U.S.	
190	Win	137–19–12 (22)	Bobby Gray	TKO	4 (10)	May 14, 1936	25 years, 301 days	Pasadena Arena, Pasadena, California, U.S.	
189	Win	136–19–12 (22)	Mark Diaz	PTS	10	May 7, 1936	25 years, 294 days	Pasadena Arena, Pasadena, California, U.S.	
188	Win	135–19–12 (22)	Joe Conde	UD	10	Apr 4, 1936	25 years, 261 days	Arena Nacional, Mexico City, Distrito Federal, Mexico	
187	Loss	134–19–12 (22)	Juan Zurita	KO	5 (10)	Mar 28, 1936	25 years, 254 days	Arena Nacional, Mexico City, Distrito Federal, Mexico	
186	Win	134–18–12 (22)	Jimmy Thomas	PTS	10	Mar 11, 1936	25 years, 237 days	Memorial Auditorium, Sacramento, California, U.S.	
185	Win	133–18–12 (22)	Varias Milling	PTS	10	Feb 22, 1936	25 years, 219 days	Pismo Beach Arena, Pismo Beach, California, U.S.	
184	NC	132–18–12 (22)	Richie Fontaine	NC	7 (10)	Jan 28, 1936	25 years, 194 days	Auditorium, Portland, Oregon, U.S.	No contest when Wolgast came in out of shape and appeared to not want to fight
183	Win	132–18–12 (21)	Dick Welsh	PTS	10	Dec 27, 1935	25 years, 162 days	Legion Stadium, Hollywood, California, U.S.	
182	Loss	131–18–12 (21)	Henry Armstrong	PTS	10	Nov 27, 1935	25 years, 132 days	Auditorium, Oakland, California, U.S.	
181	Win	131–17–12 (21)	Small Montana	PTS	10	Nov 5, 1935	25 years, 110 days	Olympic Auditorium, Los Angeles, California, U.S.	
180	Win	130–17–12 (21)	Bobby Leyvas	PTS	10	Oct 25, 1935	25 years, 99 days	Legion Stadium, Hollywood, California, U.S.	
179	Win	129–17–12 (21)	Tony Marino	PTS	10	Oct 2, 1935	25 years, 76 days	Auditorium, Oakland, California, U.S.	
178	Loss	128–17–12 (21)	Small Montana	PTS	10	Sep 16, 1935	25 years, 60 days	Auditorium, Oakland, California, U.S.	Lost NYSAC flyweight title
177	Win	128–16–12 (21)	Little Dempsey	TKO	9 (10)	Sep 3, 1935	25 years, 47 days	Olympic Auditorium, Los Angeles, California, U.S.	
176	Win	127–16–12 (21)	Herman 'Young' Gildo	PTS	10	Aug 23, 1935	25 years, 36 days	Civic Auditorium, Watsonville, California, U.S.	
175	Win	126–16–12 (21)	Frankie Covelli	PTS	10	Aug 9, 1935	25 years, 22 days	Legion Stadium, Hollywood, California, U.S.	
174	Win	125–16–12 (21)	Rodolfo Casanova	PTS	10	Jul 26, 1935	25 years, 8 days	Legion Stadium, Hollywood, California, U.S.	
173	Loss	124–16–12 (21)	Small Montana	PTS	10	Jul 3, 1935	24 years, 350 days	Memorial Auditorium, Sacramento, California, U.S.	
172	Win	124–15–12 (21)	Juan Zurita	PTS	10	Jun 28, 1935	24 years, 345 days	Legion Stadium, Hollywood, California, U.S.	
171	Win	123–15–12 (21)	Juan Zurita	PTS	10	May 31, 1935	24 years, 317 days	Legion Stadium, Hollywood, California, U.S.	
170	Loss	122–15–12 (21)	Louis Salica	PTS	10	May 3, 1935	24 years, 289 days	Legion Stadium, Hollywood, California, U.S.	For vacant world bantamweight title (California version)
169	Win	122–14–12 (21)	Bobby Fernandez	PTS	10	Apr 25, 1935	24 years, 281 days	Arena Panamericana, Ciudad Juarez, Chihuahua, Mexico	
168	Loss	121–14–12 (21)	Rodolfo Casanova	PTS	10	Apr 13, 1935	24 years, 269 days	Arena Nacional, Mexico City, Distrito Federal, Mexico	
167	Win	121–13–12 (21)	Juan Zurita	PTS	10	Feb 21, 1935	24 years, 218 days	Wrigley Field, Los Angeles, California, U.S.	
166	Win	120–13–12 (21)	Young Tommy	PTS	10	Jan 25, 1935	24 years, 191 days	Legion Stadium, Hollywood, California, U.S.	
165	Draw	119–13–12 (21)	Johnny Pena	PTS	10	Jan 11, 1935	24 years, 177 days	Auditorium, Oakland, California, U.S.	
164	Draw	119–13–11 (21)	Johnny Pena	PTS	10	Dec 12, 1934	24 years, 147 days	Auditorium, Oakland, California, U.S.	
163	Draw	119–13–10 (21)	Pablo Dano	PTS	10	Nov 27, 1934	24 years, 132 days	Olympic Auditorium, Los Angeles, California, U.S.	
162	Win	119–13–9 (21)	Peppy Sanchez	PTS	10	Nov 16, 1934	24 years, 121 days	Bakersfield Arena, Bakersfield, California, U.S.	
161	Loss	118–13–9 (21)	Pablo Dano	PTS	10	Nov 9, 1934	24 years, 114 days	Legion Stadium, Hollywood, California, U.S.	
160	Win	118–12–9 (21)	Babe Triscaro	PTS	10	Oct 1, 1934	24 years, 75 days	Public Hall, Cleveland, Ohio, U.S.	
159	Loss	117–12–9 (21)	Henry Moreno	SD	10	Sep 17, 1934	24 years, 61 days	Coliseum Arena, New Orleans, Louisiana, U.S.	
158	Win	117–11–9 (21)	Kid Laredo	PTS	10	Sep 11, 1934	24 years, 55 days	Guest Arena, Houston, Texas, U.S.	
157	Loss	116–11–9 (21)	Henry Moreno	UD	10	Sep 4, 1934	24 years, 48 days	Coliseum Arena, New Orleans, Louisiana, U.S.	
156	Win	116–10–9 (21)	Henry Hook	PTS	10	Aug 27, 1934	24 years, 40 days	Coliseum Arena, New Orleans, Louisiana, U.S.	
155	Win	115–10–9 (21)	Sammy Seaman	PTS	10	Jun 13, 1934	23 years, 330 days	Portner's Arena, Alexandria, Virginia, U.S.	
154	Draw	114–10–9 (21)	Louis Salica	PTS	8	May 1, 1934	23 years, 287 days	Stauch's Arena, Brooklyn, New York City, New York, U.S.	
153	Win	114–10–8 (21)	Louis Salica	PTS	8	Feb 14, 1934	23 years, 211 days	Broadway Arena, Brooklyn, New York City, New York, U.S.	
152	Win	113–10–8 (21)	Dewey Cannon	PTS	10	Jan 19, 1934	23 years, 185 days	American Legion Arena, Mobile, Alabama, U.S.	
151	Win	112–10–8 (21)	Jimmy Perrin	PTS	10	Jan 15, 1934	23 years, 181 days	Coliseum Arena, New Orleans, Louisiana, U.S.	
150	Draw	111–10–8 (21)	Valentin Angelmann	PTS	10	Nov 13, 1933	23 years, 118 days	Palais des Sports, Paris, Paris, France	
149	Win	111–10–7 (21)	Jackie Brown	PTS	12	Oct 30, 1933	23 years, 104 days	Royal Albert Hall, Kensington, London, England, U.K.	
148	Loss	110–10–7 (21)	Bobby Leitham	UD	10	Sep 27, 1933	23 years, 71 days	Forum, Montreal, Quebec, Canada	
147	Win	110–9–7 (21)	Freddie Lattanzio	PTS	6	Aug 30, 1933	23 years, 43 days	Memorial Field Stadium, Mount Vernon, New York, U.S.	
146	Win	109–9–7 (21)	Pete Sanstol	PTS	10	Aug 15, 1933	23 years, 28 days	Fugazy Bowl, Brooklyn, New York City, New York, U.S.	
145	Loss	108–9–7 (21)	Lew Farber	SD	10	Jul 13, 1933	22 years, 360 days	Fugazy Bowl, Brooklyn, New York City, New York, U.S.	
144	Win	108–8–7 (21)	Marty Gold	PTS	10	Jun 29, 1933	22 years, 346 days	Meadowbrook Arena, North Adams, Massachusetts, U.S.	
143	Win	107–8–7 (21)	Skippy Allen	PTS	8	Jun 28, 1933	22 years, 345 days	Fort Hamilton Arena, Brooklyn, New York City, New York, U.S.	
142	Win	106–8–7 (21)	Augie Ruggierre	PTS	10	Jun 14, 1933	22 years, 331 days	Memorial Field Stadium, Mount Vernon, New York, U.S.	
141	Loss	105–8–7 (21)	Britt Gorman	TKO	6 (10)	Jun 9, 1933	22 years, 326 days	Arena Gardens, Detroit, Michigan, U.S.	
140	Draw	105–7–7 (21)	Ernie Maurer	PTS	10	May 26, 1933	22 years, 312 days	Arena Gardens, Detroit, Michigan, U.S.	
139	Win	105–7–6 (21)	Eddie Burl	PTS	10	May 12, 1933	22 years, 298 days	Sports Center, Baltimore, Maryland, U.S.	
138	Win	104–7–6 (21)	Skippy Allen	PTS	8	Apr 10, 1933	22 years, 266 days	Waltz Dream Arena, Atlantic City, New Jersey, U.S.	
137	Win	103–7–6 (21)	Nick Montano	PTS	8	Feb 14, 1933	22 years, 211 days	Amusement Academy, Plainfield, New Jersey, U.S.	
136	Win	102–7–6 (21)	Billy Passan	TKO	7 (8)	Feb 9, 1933	22 years, 206 days	New Broadway A.C., Philadelphia, Pennsylvania, U.S.	
135	Draw	101–7–6 (21)	Jackie Wilson	PTS	10	Feb 3, 1933	22 years, 200 days	Northside Arena, Pittsburgh, Pennsylvania, U.S.	
134	Win	101–7–5 (21)	Billy Landers	PTS	10	Jan 30, 1933	22 years, 196 days	Oasis, Portsmouth, Virginia, U.S.	
133	Loss	100–7–5 (21)	Young Tommy	PTS	10	Oct 26, 1932	22 years, 100 days	Auditorium, Oakland, California, U.S.	
132	Draw	100–6–5 (21)	Lew Snyder	PTS	10	Oct 14, 1932	22 years, 88 days	Coliseum, San Diego, California, U.S.	
131	Win	100–6–4 (21)	Pedro Villanueva	PTS	10	Sep 30, 1932	22 years, 74 days	Legion Stadium, Hollywood, California, U.S.	
130	Draw	99–6–4 (21)	Speedy Dado	PTS	10	Sep 21, 1932	22 years, 65 days	Auditorium, Oakland, California, U.S.	
129	Win	99–6–3 (21)	Young Tommy	PTS	10	Aug 3, 1932	22 years, 16 days	Auditorium, Oakland, California, U.S.	
128	Win	98–6–3 (21)	Marty Gold	PTS	10	Jun 14, 1932	21 years, 332 days	Passaic Stadium, Passaic, New Jersey, U.S.	
127	Win	97–6–3 (21)	Tony Marino	UD	10	Jun 6, 1932	21 years, 324 days	Meyers Bowl, North Braddock, Pennsylvania, U.S.	
126	Draw	96–6–3 (21)	Little Pancho	SD	10	Apr 15, 1932	21 years, 272 days	Honolulu Stadium, Honolulu, Hawaii	
125	Win	96–6–2 (21)	Alejandro Pasmore	PTS	10	Apr 9, 1932	21 years, 266 days	Volcano Arena, Hilo, Hawaii	
124	Win	95–6–2 (21)	Johnny Yasui	PTS	8	Apr 2, 1932	21 years, 259 days	Schofield Barracks, Honolulu, Hawaii	
123	Win	94–6–2 (21)	Little Pancho	UD	10	Mar 18, 1932	21 years, 244 days	Honolulu Stadium, Honolulu, Hawaii	
122	Win	93–6–2 (21)	Tommy Hughes	PTS	10	Feb 12, 1932	21 years, 209 days	Legion Stadium, Hollywood, California, U.S.	
121	Win	92–6–2 (21)	Billy Landers	PTS	8	Jan 12, 1932	21 years, 178 days	Portner's Arena, Alexandria, Virginia, U.S.	
120	Win	91–6–2 (21)	Chato Laredo	PTS	10	Dec 18, 1931	21 years, 153 days	Dreamland Auditorium, San Francisco, California, U.S.	
119	Win	90–6–2 (21)	Canto Robledo	TKO	5 (10)	Dec 11, 1931	21 years, 146 days	Dreamland Auditorium, San Francisco, California, U.S.	
118	Win	89–6–2 (21)	Speedy Dado	PTS	10	Dec 2, 1931	21 years, 137 days	Auditorium, Oakland, California, U.S.	
117	Win	88–6–2 (21)	Chato Laredo	PTS	10	Oct 22, 1931	21 years, 96 days	Memorial Auditorium, Sacramento, California, U.S.	
116	Win	87–6–2 (21)	Tony Russell	KO	3 (10)	Oct 14, 1931	21 years, 88 days	Auditorium, Oakland, California, U.S.	
115	Win	86–6–2 (21)	Speedy Dado	PTS	10	Oct 7, 1931	21 years, 81 days	Auditorium, Oakland, California, U.S.	
114	Win	85–6–2 (21)	Johnny Edwards	PTS	10	Sep 22, 1931	21 years, 66 days	Fort Benjamin Harrison, Lawrence, Indiana, U.S.	
113	Win	84–6–2 (21)	Joe Dragon	PTS	10	Sep 21, 1931	21 years, 65 days	Silver Fox Arena, Muncie, Indiana, U.S.	
112	Win	83–6–2 (21)	Frisco Grande	PTS	10	Sep 17, 1931	21 years, 61 days	Terre Haute, Indiana, U.S.	
111	Win	82–6–2 (21)	Happy Atherton	PTS	10	Sep 8, 1931	21 years, 52 days	Fort Benjamin Harrison, Lawrence, Indiana, U.S.	
110	Loss	81–6–2 (21)	Cris Pineda	PTS	10	Aug 20, 1931	21 years, 33 days	Meadowbrook Arena, North Adams, Massachusetts, U.S.	
109	Win	81–5–2 (21)	Dick Welsh	PTS	10	Aug 17, 1931	21 years, 30 days	Bain Field, Norfolk, Virginia, U.S.	
108	Win	80–5–2 (21)	Johnny Brennan	PTS	10	Aug 4, 1931	21 years, 17 days	Oakland Outdoor Arena, Jersey City, New Jersey, U.S.	
107	Win	79–5–2 (21)	Joey Eulo	PTS	10	Jul 23, 1931	21 years, 5 days	Peerless Oval, Paterson, New Jersey, U.S.	
106	Win	78–5–2 (21)	Ruby Bradley	UD	15	Jul 13, 1931	20 years, 360 days	Coney Island Stadium, Brooklyn, New York City, New York, U.S.	Retained NYSAC flyweight title
105	Win	77–5–2 (21)	Lew Franklin	PTS	10	Jun 19, 1931	20 years, 336 days	Atlantic City Auditorium, Atlantic City, New Jersey, U.S.	
104	Win	76–5–2 (21)	Jackie Harmon	TKO	7 (10)	Jun 11, 1931	20 years, 328 days	Meadowbrook Arena, North Adams, Massachusetts, U.S.	
103	Win	75–5–2 (21)	Lew Farber	PTS	10	Jun 1, 1931	20 years, 318 days	Valley Arena, Holyoke, Massachusetts, U.S.	
102	Win	74–5–2 (21)	Lew Farber	PTS	10	May 4, 1931	20 years, 290 days	Valley Arena, Holyoke, Massachusetts, U.S.	
101	Win	73–5–2 (21)	Archie Bell	PTS	10	Apr 13, 1931	20 years, 269 days	Motor Square Garden, Pittsburgh, Pennsylvania, U.S.	
100	Win	72–5–2 (21)	Pinky Silverberg	PTS	10	Mar 9, 1931	20 years, 234 days	Park Arena, Bridgeport, Connecticut, U.S.	
99	Win	71–5–2 (21)	Willie Davies	UD	10	Mar 3, 1931	20 years, 228 days	Motor Square Garden, Pittsburgh, Pennsylvania, U.S.	
98	Win	70–5–2 (21)	Al Beauregard	PTS	10	Feb 23, 1931	20 years, 220 days	Valley Arena, Holyoke, Massachusetts, U.S.	
97	Win	69–5–2 (21)	Al Beauregard	TKO	3 (10)	Feb 13, 1931	20 years, 210 days	Park Arena, Bridgeport, Connecticut, U.S.	
96	Draw	68–5–2 (21)	Frankie Genaro	SD	15	Dec 26, 1930	20 years, 161 days	Madison Square Garden, Manhattan, New York City, New York, U.S.	Retained NYSAC flyweight title; For NBA and vacant The Ring flyweight titles
95	Win	68–5–1 (21)	Willie Davies	UD	10	Dec 19, 1930	20 years, 154 days	Coliseum, Toronto, Quebec, Canada	
94	Win	67–5–1 (21)	Frankie Bauman	PTS	10	Dec 11, 1930	20 years, 146 days	Armory, Paterson, New Jersey, U.S.	
93	Win	66–5–1 (21)	Allie Tedesco	PTS	10	Dec 1, 1930	20 years, 136 days	Oakland Arena, Jersey City, New Jersey, U.S.	
92	Loss	65–5–1 (21)	Newsboy Brown	PTS	10	Aug 19, 1930	20 years, 32 days	Olympic Auditorium, Los Angeles, California, U.S.	
91	Win	65–4–1 (21)	Canto Robledo	PTS	10	Aug 8, 1930	20 years, 21 days	Legion Stadium, Hollywood, California, U.S.	
90	Win	64–4–1 (21)	Speedy Dado	RTD	5 (10)	Jul 29, 1930	20 years, 11 days	Olympic Auditorium, Los Angeles, California, U.S.	
89	Win	63–4–1 (21)	Ernie Peters	PTS	8	Jul 17, 1930	19 years, 364 days	Yankee Stadium, Bronx, New York City, New York, U.S.	
88	Win	62–4–1 (21)	Routier Parra	PTS	10	Jul 7, 1930	19 years, 354 days	Hoboken Ave. Outdoor Arena, Jersey City, New Jersey, U.S.	
87	Win	61–4–1 (21)	Frankie Bauman	PTS	10	Jun 16, 1930	19 years, 333 days	Hoboken Ave. Outdoor Arena, Jersey City, New Jersey, U.S.	
86	Win	60–4–1 (21)	Willie LaMorte	TKO	5 (15)	May 16, 1930	19 years, 302 days	Madison Square Garden, Manhattan, New York City, New York, U.S.	Retained NYSAC flyweight title
85	Win	59–4–1 (21)	Pinky Silverberg	PTS	8	May 8, 1930	19 years, 294 days	New Broadway A.C., Philadelphia, Pennsylvania, U.S.	
84	Win	58–4–1 (21)	Eladio Valdés	PTS	15	Mar 21, 1930	19 years, 246 days	Madison Square Garden, Manhattan, New York City, New York, U.S.	Won vacant NYSAC flyweight title
83	Win	57–4–1 (21)	Pinky Silverberg	PTS	10	Mar 10, 1930	19 years, 235 days	Jamaica Arena, Jamaica, Queens, New York City, New York, U.S.	
82	Win	56–4–1 (21)	Frisco Grande	PTS	10	Feb 10, 1930	19 years, 207 days	Jamaica Arena, Jamaica, Queens, New York City, New York, U.S.	
81	Win	55–4–1 (21)	Motee "Kid" Singh	PTS	10	Dec 14, 1929	19 years, 149 days	Olympia Boxing Club, Manhattan, New York City, New York, U.S.	
80	Win	54–4–1 (21)	Tommy Abobo	PTS	8	Dec 3, 1929	19 years, 138 days	Chestnut Street Auditorium, Harrisburg, Pennsylvania, U.S.	
79	Win	53–4–1 (21)	Routier Parra	NWS	8	Nov 21, 1929	19 years, 126 days	Paterson Armory, Paterson, New Jersey, U.S.	
78	Win	53–4–1 (20)	Jose Allano	PTS	8	Nov 19, 1929	19 years, 124 days	Chestnut Street Auditorium, Harrisburg, Pennsylvania, U.S.	
77	Win	52–4–1 (20)	Johnny McCoy	PTS	10	Nov 4, 1929	19 years, 109 days	Madison Square Garden, Manhattan, New York City, New York, U.S.	
76	Win	51–4–1 (20)	Frankie Anselm	PTS	10	Sep 24, 1929	19 years, 68 days	Sesquicentennial Stadium, Philadelphia, Pennsylvania, U.S.	
75	Win	50–4–1 (20)	Eddie Enos	PTS	10	Aug 31, 1929	19 years, 44 days	Playland Stadium, Rockaway Beach, Queens, New York City, New York, U.S.	
74	Win	49–4–1 (20)	Tommy Abobo	PTS	10	Aug 9, 1929	19 years, 22 days	Playland Stadium, Rockaway Beach, Queens, New York City, New York, U.S.	
73	Win	48–4–1 (20)	Frankie Anselm	PTS	8	Aug 1, 1929	19 years, 14 days	New Broadway Outdoor Arena, Philadelphia, Pennsylvania, U.S.	
72	Win	47–4–1 (20)	Tommy Milton	KO	3 (10)	Jul 26, 1929	19 years, 8 days	Playland Stadium, Rockaway Beach, Queens, New York City, New York, U.S.	
71	Win	46–4–1 (20)	Routier Parra	TKO	7 (10)	Jul 12, 1929	18 years, 359 days	Playland Stadium, Rockaway Beach, Queens, New York City, New York, U.S.	
70	Win	45–4–1 (20)	Steve Cole	PTS	8	May 30, 1929	18 years, 316 days	New Broadway A.C., Philadelphia, Pennsylvania, U.S.	
69	Win	44–4–1 (20)	Phil Tobias	PTS	10	Apr 22, 1929	18 years, 278 days	Coliseum, Toronto, Quebec, Canada	
68	Win	43–4–1 (20)	Willie Davies	SD	10	Apr 15, 1929	18 years, 271 days	Jolly Bowl, New Castle, Pennsylvania, U.S.	
67	Win	42–4–1 (20)	Frisco Grande	MD	10	Mar 25, 1929	18 years, 250 days	Jolly Bowl, New Castle, Pennsylvania, U.S.	
66	Win	41–4–1 (20)	Routier Parra	PTS	8	Feb 28, 1929	18 years, 225 days	New Broadway A.C., Philadelphia, Pennsylvania, U.S.	
65	Win	40–4–1 (20)	Ruby Bradley	PTS	10	Feb 18, 1929	18 years, 215 days	Coliseum, Toronto, Quebec, Canada	
64	Draw	39–4–1 (20)	Phil Tobias	PTS	10	Feb 11, 1929	18 years, 208 days	Broadway Arena, Brooklyn, New York City, New York, U.S.	
63	Win	39–4 (20)	Phil Tobias	PTS	8	Jan 26, 1929	18 years, 192 days	Olympia A.C., Philadelphia, Pennsylvania, U.S.	
62	Win	38–4 (20)	Marty Gold	PTS	8	Jan 14, 1929	18 years, 180 days	Waltz Dream Arena, Atlantic City, New Jersey, U.S.	
61	Win	37–4 (20)	Frisco Grande	PTS	8	Dec 20, 1928	18 years, 155 days	New Broadway A.C., Philadelphia, Pennsylvania, U.S.	
60	Win	36–4 (20)	Marty Gold	PTS	10	Dec 3, 1928	18 years, 138 days	Coliseum, Toronto, Quebec, Canada	
59	Loss	35–4 (20)	Phil Tobias	PTS	10	Nov 19, 1928	18 years, 124 days	Broadway Arena, Brooklyn, New York City, New York, U.S.	
58	Win	35–3 (20)	Lew Goldberg	PTS	8	Oct 11, 1928	18 years, 85 days	New Broadway A.C., Philadelphia, Pennsylvania, U.S.	
57	Win	34–3 (20)	Steve Cole	PTS	10	Sep 7, 1928	18 years, 51 days	Fair Grounds Arena, Allentown, Pennsylvania, U.S.	Retained USA Pennsylvania State flyweight title
56	Win	33–3 (20)	Phil Tobias	PTS	8	Aug 22, 1928	18 years, 35 days	Bacharach Ball Park, Atlantic City, New Jersey, U.S.	
55	Win	32–3 (20)	Phil Tobias	NWS	10	Jul 30, 1928	18 years, 12 days	Jersey City, New Jersey, U.S.	
54	Win	32–3 (19)	Battling Griffin	UD	8	Jun 28, 1928	17 years, 346 days	New Broadway A.C., Philadelphia, Pennsylvania, U.S.	Retained USA Pennsylvania State flyweight title
53	Win	31–3 (19)	Jose Allano	NWS	10	Jun 21, 1928	17 years, 339 days	Atlantic City, New Jersey, U.S.	
52	Win	31–3 (18)	Willie Davies	PTS	10	May 28, 1928	17 years, 315 days	Arena, Philadelphia, Pennsylvania, U.S.	Won vacant USA Pennsylvania State flyweight title
51	Win	30–3 (18)	Charley Rogers	PTS	8	May 4, 1928	17 years, 291 days	Wildwood, New Jersey, U.S.	Date needs verification
50	Win	29–3 (18)	Ernie Peters	NWS	10	Apr 27, 1928	17 years, 284 days	Fort Wayne, Indiana, U.S.	
49	Win	29–3 (17)	George Burns	KO	4 (8)	Apr 20, 1928	17 years, 277 days	Dance Arena, Wildwood, New Jersey, U.S.	
48	Win	28–3 (17)	Charley Kid Royer	KO	3 (8)	Apr 13, 1928	17 years, 270 days	Dance Arena, Wildwood, New Jersey, U.S.	
47	Win	27–3 (17)	Battling Griffin	PTS	8	Mar 26, 1928	17 years, 252 days	Waltz Dream Arena, Atlantic City, New Jersey, U.S.	
46	Win	26–3 (17)	Willie Davies	SD	10	Feb 20, 1928	17 years, 217 days	Motor Square Garden, Pittsburgh, Pennsylvania, U.S.	
45	Loss	25–3 (17)	Billy Kelly	UD	10	Jan 23, 1928	17 years, 189 days	Town Hall, Scranton, Pennsylvania, U.S.	For vacant USA Pennsylvania State flyweight title
44	Win	25–2 (17)	Marty Gold	SD	10	Jan 16, 1928	17 years, 182 days	Arena, Philadelphia, Pennsylvania, U.S.	
43	Win	24–2 (17)	Matty White	PTS	10	Dec 15, 1927	17 years, 150 days	New Broadway A.C., Philadelphia, Pennsylvania, U.S.	
42	Win	23–2 (17)	Danny Flores	NWS	8	Dec 8, 1927	17 years, 143 days	Waltz Dream Arena, Atlantic City, New Jersey, U.S.	
41	Win	23–2 (16)	Willie Davies	MD	10	Nov 3, 1927	17 years, 108 days	New Broadway A.C., Philadelphia, Pennsylvania, U.S.	
40	Win	22–2 (16)	Young Chappie	PTS	10	Oct 6, 1927	17 years, 80 days	New Broadway A.C., Philadelphia, Pennsylvania, U.S.	
39	Win	21–2 (16)	Sammy Tucker	NWS	8	Aug 17, 1927	17 years, 30 days	Dog Track, Atlantic City, New Jersey, U.S.	
38	Loss	21–2 (15)	Willie Davies	NWS	8	Aug 1, 1927	17 years, 14 days	Waltz Dream Arena, Atlantic City, New Jersey, U.S.	
37	Win	21–2 (14)	Sammy Tucker	NWS	8	Jun 6, 1927	16 years, 323 days	Waltz Dream Arena, Atlantic City, New Jersey, U.S.	
36	Win	21–2 (13)	Jose Allano	MD	8	May 10, 1927	16 years, 296 days	Chestnut Street Auditorium, Harrisburg, Pennsylvania, U.S.	
35	Win	20–2 (13)	Pussy Walker	PTS	8	May 5, 1927	16 years, 291 days	Olympia A.C., Philadelphia, Pennsylvania, U.S.	
34	Win	19–2 (13)	Isadore Schwartz	NWS	8	May 2, 1927	16 years, 288 days	Waltz Dream Arena, Atlantic City, New Jersey, U.S.	
33	Win	19–2 (12)	Eddie Covington	PTS	8	Apr 26, 1927	16 years, 282 days	Chestnut Street Auditorium, Harrisburg, Pennsylvania, U.S.	
32	Win	18–2 (12)	Eddie Covington	PTS	8	Apr 23, 1927	16 years, 279 days	Olympia A.C., Philadelphia, Pennsylvania, U.S.	
31	Win	17–2 (12)	Eddie Covington	NWS	8	Apr 4, 1927	16 years, 260 days	Waltz Dream Arena, Atlantic City, New Jersey, U.S.	
30	Win	17–2 (11)	Jose Allano	PTS	8	Mar 24, 1927	16 years, 249 days	Olympia A.C., Philadelphia, Pennsylvania, U.S.	
29	Win	16–2 (11)	Pussy Walker	PTS	6	Jan 1, 1927	16 years, 167 days	Arena, Philadelphia, Pennsylvania, U.S.	
28	Win	15–2 (11)	Jose Allano	NWS	8	Dec 20, 1926	16 years, 155 days	Waltz Dream Arena, Atlantic City, New Jersey, U.S.	
27	Win	15–2 (10)	Pussy Walker	NWS	6	Nov 18, 1926	16 years, 123 days	Waltz Dream Arena, Atlantic City, New Jersey, U.S.	
26	Win	15–2 (9)	Jimmy Britt	PTS	6	Nov 5, 1926	16 years, 110 days	Cambria A.C., Philadelphia, Pennsylvania, U.S.	
25	Win	14–2 (9)	Pussy Walker	PTS	6	Oct 15, 1926	16 years, 89 days	Cambria A.C., Philadelphia, Pennsylvania, U.S.	
24	Win	13–2 (9)	Pussy Walker	NWS	8	Sep 27, 1926	16 years, 71 days	Waltz Dream Arena, Atlantic City, New Jersey, U.S.	
23	Win	13–2 (8)	Mickey King	PTS	6	Sep 17, 1926	16 years, 61 days	Cambria A.C., Philadelphia, Pennsylvania, U.S.	
22	Win	12–2 (8)	Pussy Walker	NWS	6	Aug 20, 1926	16 years, 33 days	Bacharach Ball Park, Atlantic City, New Jersey, U.S.	
21	Win	12–2 (7)	Charley Hoffman	TKO	3 (6)	Jul 30, 1926	16 years, 12 days	Bacharach Ball Park, Atlantic City, New Jersey, U.S.	
20	Win	11–2 (7)	Tony Angelo	NWS	6	Jul 16, 1926	15 years, 363 days	Bacharach Ball Park, Atlantic City, New Jersey, U.S.	
19	Win	11–2 (6)	Dick Welsh	NWS	6	Jun 25, 1926	15 years, 342 days	Bacharach Ball Park, Atlantic City, New Jersey, U.S.	
18	Win	11–2 (5)	Bob Henry	PTS	6	May 21, 1926	15 years, 307 days	Cambria A.C., Philadelphia, Pennsylvania, U.S.	
17	Win	10–2 (5)	Bobby Dechter	NWS	6	Apr 16, 1926	15 years, 272 days	Waltz Dream Arena, Atlantic City, New Jersey, U.S.	
16	Win	10–2 (4)	Tony Angelo	NWS	6	Apr 5, 1926	15 years, 261 days	Waltz Dream Arena, Atlantic City, New Jersey, U.S.	
15	Win	10–2 (3)	Billy Squires	PTS	8	Mar 29, 1926	15 years, 254 days	Arena, Philadelphia, Pennsylvania, U.S.	
14	Win	9–2 (3)	Bobby Dechter	PTS	6	Mar 4, 1926	15 years, 229 days	New Broadway A.C., Philadelphia, Pennsylvania, U.S.	
13	Win	8–2 (3)	Charley Bethel	NWS	6	Mar 1, 1926	15 years, 226 days	Waltz Dream Arena, Atlantic City, New Jersey, U.S.	
12	Win	8–2 (2)	Buddy Homan	NWS	6	Feb 15, 1926	15 years, 212 days	Waltz Dream Arena, Atlantic City, New Jersey, U.S.	
11	Win	8–2 (1)	Bobby Russell	PTS	6	Feb 4, 1926	15 years, 201 days	New Broadway A.C., Philadelphia, Pennsylvania, U.S.	
10	Win	7–2 (1)	Tony Angelo	KO	4 (6)	Jan 18, 1926	15 years, 184 days	Waltz Dream Arena, Atlantic City, New Jersey, U.S.	
9	Win	6–2 (1)	Billy Richards	PTS	6	Jan 14, 1926	15 years, 180 days	New Broadway A.C., Philadelphia, Pennsylvania, U.S.	
8	Win	5–2 (1)	Bobby Russell	NWS	6	Dec 28, 1925	15 years, 163 days	Waltz Dream Arena, Atlantic City, New Jersey, U.S.	
7	Win	5–2	Tony Angelo	PTS	4	Dec 10, 1925	15 years, 145 days	New Broadway A.C., Philadelphia, Pennsylvania, U.S.	
6	Loss	4–2	Dick Welsh	PTS	6	Nov 26, 1925	15 years, 131 days	New Broadway A.C., Philadelphia, Pennsylvania, U.S.	
5	Loss	4–1	Matty White	KO	2 (6)	Nov 6, 1925	15 years, 111 days	Cambria A.C., Philadelphia, Pennsylvania, U.S.	
4	Win	4–0	Charley Bethel	PTS	6	Nov 5, 1925	15 years, 110 days	New Broadway A.C., Philadelphia, Pennsylvania, U.S.	
3	Win	3–0	Charley Bethel	PTS	6	Oct 22, 1925	15 years, 96 days	New Broadway A.C., Philadelphia, Pennsylvania, U.S.	
2	Win	2–0	Al Klotz	TKO	4 (6)	Oct 15, 1925	15 years, 89 days	New Broadway A.C., Philadelphia, Pennsylvania, U.S.	
1	Win	1–0	Al Ketchel	PTS	6	Oct 8, 1925	15 years, 82 days	New Broadway A.C., Philadelphia, Pennsylvania, U.S.	

=== Unofficial record ===
217 fights	164 wins	37 losses
By knockout	17	6
By decision	147	31
Draws	15	
No contests	1	

Record with the inclusion of newspaper decisions in the win/loss/draw column.

No.	Result	Record	Opponent	Type	Round	Date	Age	Location	Notes
217	Loss	164–37–15 (1)	Billy Morris	PTS	6	Mar 14, 1940	29 years, 240 days	State Armory, Lancaster, Pennsylvania, U.S.	
216	Win	164–36–15 (1)	Tony Maglione	KO	1 (8)	Sep 6, 1939	29 years, 50 days	St. Ann's Open Air Arena, Bristol, Pennsylvania, U.S.	
215	Loss	163–36–15 (1)	Billy Mims	TKO	5 (8)	Jul 18, 1939	29 years, 0 days	Cambria Stadium, Philadelphia, Pennsylvania, U.S.	
214	Loss	163–35–15 (1)	Mayon Padlo	RTD	3 (8)	Mar 3, 1939	28 years, 228 days	Cambria A.C., Philadelphia, Pennsylvania, U.S.	
213	Loss	163–34–15 (1)	Teddy Baldwin	PTS	8	Feb 9, 1939	28 years, 206 days	Olympia A.C., Philadelphia, Pennsylvania, U.S.	
212	Loss	163–33–15 (1)	Teddy Baldwin	SD	8	Jan 19, 1939	28 years, 185 days	Olympia A.C., Philadelphia, Pennsylvania, U.S.	
211	Loss	163–32–15 (1)	Johnny Craven	TKO	1 (10)	Jun 16, 1938	27 years, 333 days	L.A.M. Stadium, Norristown, Pennsylvania, U.S.	Wolgast's arm was broken when he landed a left hook
210	Loss	163–31–15 (1)	Eddie Dolan	PTS	10	Mar 4, 1938	27 years, 229 days	Cambria A.C., Philadelphia, Pennsylvania, U.S.	
209	Loss	163–30–15 (1)	Lew Massey	PTS	10	Feb 3, 1938	27 years, 200 days	Olympia A.C., Philadelphia, Pennsylvania, U.S.	
208	Win	163–29–15 (1)	Norment Quarles	PTS	9	Jan 6, 1938	27 years, 172 days	Olympia A.C., Philadelphia, Pennsylvania, U.S.	The nine rounds were agreed upon as a compromise
207	Loss	162–29–15 (1)	Tommy Cross	PTS	10	Nov 4, 1937	27 years, 109 days	Olympia A.C., Philadelphia, Pennsylvania, U.S.	
206	Win	162–28–15 (1)	George Daly	UD	10	Oct 15, 1937	27 years, 89 days	Cambria A.C., Philadelphia, Pennsylvania, U.S.	
205	Loss	161–28–15 (1)	Maxie Berger	PTS	8	Jul 6, 1937	26 years, 353 days	Coney Island Velodrome, Brooklyn, New York City, New York, U.S.	
204	Loss	161–27–15 (1)	Lew Feldman	PTS	10	Jun 25, 1937	26 years, 342 days	Long Beach Stadium, Long Beach, California, U.S.	
203	Draw	161–26–15 (1)	Dick Welsh	PTS	10	Jun 16, 1937	26 years, 333 days	City Stadium, Richmond, Virginia, U.S.	
202	Loss	161–26–14 (1)	Tommy Cross	MD	10	May 13, 1937	26 years, 299 days	Olympia A.C., Philadelphia, Pennsylvania, U.S.	
201	Win	161–25–14 (1)	Tommy Cross	PTS	10	Feb 25, 1937	26 years, 222 days	Olympia A.C., Philadelphia, Pennsylvania, U.S.	
200	Win	160–25–14 (1)	Johnny Hutchinson	PTS	10	Feb 4, 1937	26 years, 201 days	Olympia A.C., Philadelphia, Pennsylvania, U.S.	
199	Draw	159–25–14 (1)	Norment Quarles	PTS	10	Dec 15, 1936	26 years, 150 days	Municipal Auditorium, Norfolk, Virginia, U.S.	
198	Loss	159–25–13 (1)	Davey Abad	PTS	10	Dec 3, 1936	26 years, 138 days	Municipal Auditorium, Saint Louis, California, U.S.	
197	Loss	159–24–13 (1)	Everette Rightmire	PTS	10	Nov 17, 1936	26 years, 122 days	Municipal Auditorium, Saint Louis, California, U.S.	
196	Loss	159–23–13 (1)	Perfecto Lopez	PTS	10	Oct 19, 1936	26 years, 93 days	Eastside Arena, Los Angeles, California, U.S.	
195	Loss	159–22–13 (1)	Perfecto Lopez	PTS	10	Sep 28, 1936	26 years, 72 days	Eastside Arena, Los Angeles, California, U.S.	
194	Win	159–21–13 (1)	Abie Israel	PTS	8	Aug 18, 1936	26 years, 31 days	Olympic Auditorium, Los Angeles, California, U.S.	
193	Loss	158–21–13 (1)	Juan Zurita	PTS	10	Jul 24, 1936	26 years, 6 days	Legion Stadium, Hollywood, California, U.S.	
192	Draw	158–20–13 (1)	Davey Abad	PTS	8	Jun 26, 1936	25 years, 344 days	Ventura A.C., Ventura, California, U.S.	
191	Win	158–20–12 (1)	Varias Milling	PTS	10	Jun 5, 1936	25 years, 323 days	Legion Stadium, Hollywood, California, U.S.	
190	Win	157–20–12 (1)	Bobby Gray	TKO	4 (10)	May 14, 1936	25 years, 301 days	Pasadena Arena, Pasadena, California, U.S.	
189	Win	156–20–12 (1)	Mark Diaz	PTS	10	May 7, 1936	25 years, 294 days	Pasadena Arena, Pasadena, California, U.S.	
188	Win	155–20–12 (1)	Joe Conde	UD	10	Apr 4, 1936	25 years, 261 days	Arena Nacional, Mexico City, Distrito Federal, Mexico	
187	Loss	154–20–12 (1)	Juan Zurita	KO	5 (10)	Mar 28, 1936	25 years, 254 days	Arena Nacional, Mexico City, Distrito Federal, Mexico	
186	Win	154–19–12 (1)	Jimmy Thomas	PTS	10	Mar 11, 1936	25 years, 237 days	Memorial Auditorium, Sacramento, California, U.S.	
185	Win	153–19–12 (1)	Varias Milling	PTS	10	Feb 22, 1936	25 years, 219 days	Pismo Beach Arena, Pismo Beach, California, U.S.	
184	NC	152–19–12 (1)	Richie Fontaine	NC	7 (10)	Jan 28, 1936	25 years, 194 days	Auditorium, Portland, Oregon, U.S.	No contest when Wolgast came in out of shape and appeared to not want to fight
183	Win	152–19–12	Dick Welsh	PTS	10	Dec 27, 1935	25 years, 162 days	Legion Stadium, Hollywood, California, U.S.	
182	Loss	151–19–12	Henry Armstrong	PTS	10	Nov 27, 1935	25 years, 132 days	Auditorium, Oakland, California, U.S.	
181	Win	151–18–12	Small Montana	PTS	10	Nov 5, 1935	25 years, 110 days	Olympic Auditorium, Los Angeles, California, U.S.	
180	Win	150–18–12	Bobby Leyvas	PTS	10	Oct 25, 1935	25 years, 99 days	Legion Stadium, Hollywood, California, U.S.	
179	Win	149–18–12	Tony Marino	PTS	10	Oct 2, 1935	25 years, 76 days	Auditorium, Oakland, California, U.S.	
178	Loss	148–18–12	Small Montana	PTS	10	Sep 16, 1935	25 years, 60 days	Auditorium, Oakland, California, U.S.	Lost NYSAC flyweight title
177	Win	148–17–12	Little Dempsey	TKO	9 (10)	Sep 3, 1935	25 years, 47 days	Olympic Auditorium, Los Angeles, California, U.S.	
176	Win	147–17–12	Herman 'Young' Gildo	PTS	10	Aug 23, 1935	25 years, 36 days	Civic Auditorium, Watsonville, California, U.S.	
175	Win	146–17–12	Frankie Covelli	PTS	10	Aug 9, 1935	25 years, 22 days	Legion Stadium, Hollywood, California, U.S.	
174	Win	145–17–12	Rodolfo Casanova	PTS	10	Jul 26, 1935	25 years, 8 days	Legion Stadium, Hollywood, California, U.S.	
173	Loss	144–17–12	Small Montana	PTS	10	Jul 3, 1935	24 years, 350 days	Memorial Auditorium, Sacramento, California, U.S.	
172	Win	144–16–12	Juan Zurita	PTS	10	Jun 28, 1935	24 years, 345 days	Legion Stadium, Hollywood, California, U.S.	
171	Win	143–16–12	Juan Zurita	PTS	10	May 31, 1935	24 years, 317 days	Legion Stadium, Hollywood, California, U.S.	
170	Loss	142–16–12	Louis Salica	PTS	10	May 3, 1935	24 years, 289 days	Legion Stadium, Hollywood, California, U.S.	For vacant world bantamweight title (California version)
169	Win	142–15–12	Bobby Fernandez	PTS	10	Apr 25, 1935	24 years, 281 days	Arena Panamericana, Ciudad Juarez, Chihuahua, Mexico	
168	Loss	141–15–12	Rodolfo Casanova	PTS	10	Apr 13, 1935	24 years, 269 days	Arena Nacional, Mexico City, Distrito Federal, Mexico	
167	Win	141–14–12	Juan Zurita	PTS	10	Feb 21, 1935	24 years, 218 days	Wrigley Field, Los Angeles, California, U.S.	
166	Win	140–14–12	Young Tommy	PTS	10	Jan 25, 1935	24 years, 191 days	Legion Stadium, Hollywood, California, U.S.	
165	Draw	139–14–12	Johnny Pena	PTS	10	Jan 11, 1935	24 years, 177 days	Auditorium, Oakland, California, U.S.	
164	Draw	139–14–11	Johnny Pena	PTS	10	Dec 12, 1934	24 years, 147 days	Auditorium, Oakland, California, U.S.	
163	Draw	139–14–10	Pablo Dano	PTS	10	Nov 27, 1934	24 years, 132 days	Olympic Auditorium, Los Angeles, California, U.S.	
162	Win	139–14–9	Peppy Sanchez	PTS	10	Nov 16, 1934	24 years, 121 days	Bakersfield Arena, Bakersfield, California, U.S.	
161	Loss	138–14–9	Pablo Dano	PTS	10	Nov 9, 1934	24 years, 114 days	Legion Stadium, Hollywood, California, U.S.	
160	Win	138–13–9	Babe Triscaro	PTS	10	Oct 1, 1934	24 years, 75 days	Public Hall, Cleveland, Ohio, U.S.	
159	Loss	137–13–9	Henry Moreno	SD	10	Sep 17, 1934	24 years, 61 days	Coliseum Arena, New Orleans, Louisiana, U.S.	
158	Win	137–12–9	Kid Laredo	PTS	10	Sep 11, 1934	24 years, 55 days	Guest Arena, Houston, Texas, U.S.	
157	Loss	136–12–9	Henry Moreno	UD	10	Sep 4, 1934	24 years, 48 days	Coliseum Arena, New Orleans, Louisiana, U.S.	
156	Win	136–11–9	Henry Hook	PTS	10	Aug 27, 1934	24 years, 40 days	Coliseum Arena, New Orleans, Louisiana, U.S.	
155	Win	135–11–9	Sammy Seaman	PTS	10	Jun 13, 1934	23 years, 330 days	Portner's Arena, Alexandria, Virginia, U.S.	
154	Draw	134–11–9	Louis Salica	PTS	8	May 1, 1934	23 years, 287 days	Stauch's Arena, Brooklyn, New York City, New York, U.S.	
153	Win	134–11–8	Louis Salica	PTS	8	Feb 14, 1934	23 years, 211 days	Broadway Arena, Brooklyn, New York City, New York, U.S.	
152	Win	133–11–8	Dewey Cannon	PTS	10	Jan 19, 1934	23 years, 185 days	American Legion Arena, Mobile, Alabama, U.S.	
151	Win	132–11–8	Jimmy Perrin	PTS	10	Jan 15, 1934	23 years, 181 days	Coliseum Arena, New Orleans, Louisiana, U.S.	
150	Draw	131–11–8	Valentin Angelmann	PTS	10	Nov 13, 1933	23 years, 118 days	Palais des Sports, Paris, Paris, France	
149	Win	131–11–7	Jackie Brown	PTS	12	Oct 30, 1933	23 years, 104 days	Royal Albert Hall, Kensington, London, England, U.K.	
148	Loss	130–11–7	Bobby Leitham	UD	10	Sep 27, 1933	23 years, 71 days	Forum, Montreal, Quebec, Canada	
147	Win	130–10–7	Freddie Lattanzio	PTS	6	Aug 30, 1933	23 years, 43 days	Memorial Field Stadium, Mount Vernon, New York, U.S.	
146	Win	129–10–7	Pete Sanstol	PTS	10	Aug 15, 1933	23 years, 28 days	Fugazy Bowl, Brooklyn, New York City, New York, U.S.	
145	Loss	128–10–7	Lew Farber	SD	10	Jul 13, 1933	22 years, 360 days	Fugazy Bowl, Brooklyn, New York City, New York, U.S.	
144	Win	128–9–7	Marty Gold	PTS	10	Jun 29, 1933	22 years, 346 days	Meadowbrook Arena, North Adams, Massachusetts, U.S.	
143	Win	127–9–7	Skippy Allen	PTS	8	Jun 28, 1933	22 years, 345 days	Fort Hamilton Arena, Brooklyn, New York City, New York, U.S.	
142	Win	126–9–7	Augie Ruggierre	PTS	10	Jun 14, 1933	22 years, 331 days	Memorial Field Stadium, Mount Vernon, New York, U.S.	
141	Loss	125–9–7	Britt Gorman	TKO	6 (10)	Jun 9, 1933	22 years, 326 days	Arena Gardens, Detroit, Michigan, U.S.	
140	Draw	125–8–7	Ernie Maurer	PTS	10	May 26, 1933	22 years, 312 days	Arena Gardens, Detroit, Michigan, U.S.	
139	Win	125–8–6	Eddie Burl	PTS	10	May 12, 1933	22 years, 298 days	Sports Center, Baltimore, Maryland, U.S.	
138	Win	124–8–6	Skippy Allen	PTS	8	Apr 10, 1933	22 years, 266 days	Waltz Dream Arena, Atlantic City, New Jersey, U.S.	
137	Win	123–8–6	Nick Montano	PTS	8	Feb 14, 1933	22 years, 211 days	Amusement Academy, Plainfield, New Jersey, U.S.	
136	Win	122–8–6	Billy Passan	TKO	7 (8)	Feb 9, 1933	22 years, 206 days	New Broadway A.C., Philadelphia, Pennsylvania, U.S.	
135	Draw	121–8–6	Jackie Wilson	PTS	10	Feb 3, 1933	22 years, 200 days	Northside Arena, Pittsburgh, Pennsylvania, U.S.	
134	Win	121–8–5	Billy Landers	PTS	10	Jan 30, 1933	22 years, 196 days	Oasis, Portsmouth, Virginia, U.S.	
133	Loss	120–8–5	Young Tommy	PTS	10	Oct 26, 1932	22 years, 100 days	Auditorium, Oakland, California, U.S.	
132	Draw	120–7–5	Lew Snyder	PTS	10	Oct 14, 1932	22 years, 88 days	Coliseum, San Diego, California, U.S.	
131	Win	120–7–4	Pedro Villanueva	PTS	10	Sep 30, 1932	22 years, 74 days	Legion Stadium, Hollywood, California, U.S.	
130	Draw	119–7–4	Speedy Dado	PTS	10	Sep 21, 1932	22 years, 65 days	Auditorium, Oakland, California, U.S.	
129	Win	119–7–3	Young Tommy	PTS	10	Aug 3, 1932	22 years, 16 days	Auditorium, Oakland, California, U.S.	
128	Win	118–7–3	Marty Gold	PTS	10	Jun 14, 1932	21 years, 332 days	Passaic Stadium, Passaic, New Jersey, U.S.	
127	Win	117–7–3	Tony Marino	UD	10	Jun 6, 1932	21 years, 324 days	Meyers Bowl, North Braddock, Pennsylvania, U.S.	
126	Draw	116–7–3	Little Pancho	SD	10	Apr 15, 1932	21 years, 272 days	Honolulu Stadium, Honolulu, Hawaii	
125	Win	116–7–2	Alejandro Pasmore	PTS	10	Apr 9, 1932	21 years, 266 days	Volcano Arena, Hilo, Hawaii	
124	Win	115–7–2	Johnny Yasui	PTS	8	Apr 2, 1932	21 years, 259 days	Schofield Barracks, Honolulu, Hawaii	
123	Win	114–7–2	Little Pancho	UD	10	Mar 18, 1932	21 years, 244 days	Honolulu Stadium, Honolulu, Hawaii	
122	Win	113–7–2	Tommy Hughes	PTS	10	Feb 12, 1932	21 years, 209 days	Legion Stadium, Hollywood, California, U.S.	
121	Win	112–7–2	Billy Landers	PTS	8	Jan 12, 1932	21 years, 178 days	Portner's Arena, Alexandria, Virginia, U.S.	
120	Win	111–7–2	Chato Laredo	PTS	10	Dec 18, 1931	21 years, 153 days	Dreamland Auditorium, San Francisco, California, U.S.	
119	Win	110–7–2	Canto Robledo	TKO	5 (10)	Dec 11, 1931	21 years, 146 days	Dreamland Auditorium, San Francisco, California, U.S.	
118	Win	109–7–2	Speedy Dado	PTS	10	Dec 2, 1931	21 years, 137 days	Auditorium, Oakland, California, U.S.	
117	Win	108–7–2	Chato Laredo	PTS	10	Oct 22, 1931	21 years, 96 days	Memorial Auditorium, Sacramento, California, U.S.	
116	Win	107–7–2	Tony Russell	KO	3 (10)	Oct 14, 1931	21 years, 88 days	Auditorium, Oakland, California, U.S.	
115	Win	106–7–2	Speedy Dado	PTS	10	Oct 7, 1931	21 years, 81 days	Auditorium, Oakland, California, U.S.	
114	Win	105–7–2	Johnny Edwards	PTS	10	Sep 22, 1931	21 years, 66 days	Fort Benjamin Harrison, Lawrence, Indiana, U.S.	
113	Win	104–7–2	Joe Dragon	PTS	10	Sep 21, 1931	21 years, 65 days	Silver Fox Arena, Muncie, Indiana, U.S.	
112	Win	103–7–2	Frisco Grande	PTS	10	Sep 17, 1931	21 years, 61 days	Terre Haute, Indiana, U.S.	
111	Win	102–7–2	Happy Atherton	PTS	10	Sep 8, 1931	21 years, 52 days	Fort Benjamin Harrison, Lawrence, Indiana, U.S.	
110	Loss	101–7–2	Cris Pineda	PTS	10	Aug 20, 1931	21 years, 33 days	Meadowbrook Arena, North Adams, Massachusetts, U.S.	
109	Win	101–6–2	Dick Welsh	PTS	10	Aug 17, 1931	21 years, 30 days	Bain Field, Norfolk, Virginia, U.S.	
108	Win	100–6–2	Johnny Brennan	PTS	10	Aug 4, 1931	21 years, 17 days	Oakland Outdoor Arena, Jersey City, New Jersey, U.S.	
107	Win	99–6–2	Joey Eulo	PTS	10	Jul 23, 1931	21 years, 5 days	Peerless Oval, Paterson, New Jersey, U.S.	
106	Win	98–6–2	Ruby Bradley	UD	15	Jul 13, 1931	20 years, 360 days	Coney Island Stadium, Brooklyn, New York City, New York, U.S.	Retained NYSAC flyweight title
105	Win	97–6–2	Lew Franklin	PTS	10	Jun 19, 1931	20 years, 336 days	Atlantic City Auditorium, Atlantic City, New Jersey, U.S.	
104	Win	96–6–2	Jackie Harmon	TKO	7 (10)	Jun 11, 1931	20 years, 328 days	Meadowbrook Arena, North Adams, Massachusetts, U.S.	
103	Win	95–6–2	Lew Farber	PTS	10	Jun 1, 1931	20 years, 318 days	Valley Arena, Holyoke, Massachusetts, U.S.	
102	Win	94–6–2	Lew Farber	PTS	10	May 4, 1931	20 years, 290 days	Valley Arena, Holyoke, Massachusetts, U.S.	
101	Win	93–6–2	Archie Bell	PTS	10	Apr 13, 1931	20 years, 269 days	Motor Square Garden, Pittsburgh, Pennsylvania, U.S.	
100	Win	92–6–2	Pinky Silverberg	PTS	10	Mar 9, 1931	20 years, 234 days	Park Arena, Bridgeport, Connecticut, U.S.	
99	Win	91–6–2	Willie Davies	UD	10	Mar 3, 1931	20 years, 228 days	Motor Square Garden, Pittsburgh, Pennsylvania, U.S.	
98	Win	90–6–2	Al Beauregard	PTS	10	Feb 23, 1931	20 years, 220 days	Valley Arena, Holyoke, Massachusetts, U.S.	
97	Win	89–6–2	Al Beauregard	TKO	3 (10)	Feb 13, 1931	20 years, 210 days	Park Arena, Bridgeport, Connecticut, U.S.	
96	Draw	88–6–2	Frankie Genaro	SD	15	Dec 26, 1930	20 years, 161 days	Madison Square Garden, Manhattan, New York City, New York, U.S.	Retained NYSAC flyweight title; For NBA and vacant The Ring flyweight titles
95	Win	88–6–1	Willie Davies	UD	10	Dec 19, 1930	20 years, 154 days	Coliseum, Toronto, Quebec, Canada	
94	Win	87–6–1	Frankie Bauman	PTS	10	Dec 11, 1930	20 years, 146 days	Armory, Paterson, New Jersey, U.S.	
93	Win	86–6–1	Allie Tedesco	PTS	10	Dec 1, 1930	20 years, 136 days	Oakland Arena, Jersey City, New Jersey, U.S.	
92	Loss	85–6–1	Newsboy Brown	PTS	10	Aug 19, 1930	20 years, 32 days	Olympic Auditorium, Los Angeles, California, U.S.	
91	Win	85–5–1	Canto Robledo	PTS	10	Aug 8, 1930	20 years, 21 days	Legion Stadium, Hollywood, California, U.S.	
90	Win	84–5–1	Speedy Dado	RTD	5 (10)	Jul 29, 1930	20 years, 11 days	Olympic Auditorium, Los Angeles, California, U.S.	
89	Win	83–5–1	Ernie Peters	PTS	8	Jul 17, 1930	19 years, 364 days	Yankee Stadium, Bronx, New York City, New York, U.S.	
88	Win	82–5–1	Routier Parra	PTS	10	Jul 7, 1930	19 years, 354 days	Hoboken Ave. Outdoor Arena, Jersey City, New Jersey, U.S.	
87	Win	81–5–1	Frankie Bauman	PTS	10	Jun 16, 1930	19 years, 333 days	Hoboken Ave. Outdoor Arena, Jersey City, New Jersey, U.S.	
86	Win	80–5–1	Willie LaMorte	TKO	5 (15)	May 16, 1930	19 years, 302 days	Madison Square Garden, Manhattan, New York City, New York, U.S.	Retained NYSAC flyweight title
85	Win	79–5–1	Pinky Silverberg	PTS	8	May 8, 1930	19 years, 294 days	New Broadway A.C., Philadelphia, Pennsylvania, U.S.	
84	Win	78–5–1	Eladio Valdés	PTS	15	Mar 21, 1930	19 years, 246 days	Madison Square Garden, Manhattan, New York City, New York, U.S.	Won vacant NYSAC flyweight title
83	Win	77–5–1	Pinky Silverberg	PTS	10	Mar 10, 1930	19 years, 235 days	Jamaica Arena, Jamaica, Queens, New York City, New York, U.S.	
82	Win	76–5–1	Frisco Grande	PTS	10	Feb 10, 1930	19 years, 207 days	Jamaica Arena, Jamaica, Queens, New York City, New York, U.S.	
81	Win	75–5–1	Motee (Kid) Singh	PTS	10	Dec 14, 1929	19 years, 149 days	Olympia Boxing Club, Manhattan, New York City, New York, U.S.	
80	Win	74–5–1	Tommy Abobo	PTS	8	Dec 3, 1929	19 years, 138 days	Chestnut Street Auditorium, Harrisburg, Pennsylvania, U.S.	
79	Win	73–5–1	Routier Parra	NWS	8	Nov 21, 1929	19 years, 126 days	Paterson Armory, Paterson, New Jersey, U.S.	
78	Win	72–5–1	Jose Allano	PTS	8	Nov 19, 1929	19 years, 124 days	Chestnut Street Auditorium, Harrisburg, Pennsylvania, U.S.	
77	Win	71–5–1	Johnny McCoy	PTS	10	Nov 4, 1929	19 years, 109 days	Madison Square Garden, Manhattan, New York City, New York, U.S.	
76	Win	70–5–1	Frankie Anselm	PTS	10	Sep 24, 1929	19 years, 68 days	Sesquicentennial Stadium, Philadelphia, Pennsylvania, U.S.	
75	Win	69–5–1	Eddie Enos	PTS	10	Aug 31, 1929	19 years, 44 days	Playland Stadium, Rockaway Beach, Queens, New York City, New York, U.S.	
74	Win	68–5–1	Tommy Abobo	PTS	10	Aug 9, 1929	19 years, 22 days	Playland Stadium, Rockaway Beach, Queens, New York City, New York, U.S.	
73	Win	67–5–1	Frankie Anselm	PTS	8	Aug 1, 1929	19 years, 14 days	New Broadway Outdoor Arena, Philadelphia, Pennsylvania, U.S.	
72	Win	66–5–1	Tommy Milton	KO	3 (10)	Jul 26, 1929	19 years, 8 days	Playland Stadium, Rockaway Beach, Queens, New York City, New York, U.S.	
71	Win	65–5–1	Routier Parra	TKO	7 (10)	Jul 12, 1929	18 years, 359 days	Playland Stadium, Rockaway Beach, Queens, New York City, New York, U.S.	
70	Win	64–5–1	Steve Cole	PTS	8	May 30, 1929	18 years, 316 days	New Broadway A.C., Philadelphia, Pennsylvania, U.S.	
69	Win	63–5–1	Phil Tobias	PTS	10	Apr 22, 1929	18 years, 278 days	Coliseum, Toronto, Quebec, Canada	
68	Win	62–5–1	Willie Davies	SD	10	Apr 15, 1929	18 years, 271 days	Jolly Bowl, New Castle, Pennsylvania, U.S.	
67	Win	61–5–1	Frisco Grande	MD	10	Mar 25, 1929	18 years, 250 days	Jolly Bowl, New Castle, Pennsylvania, U.S.	
66	Win	60–5–1	Routier Parra	PTS	8	Feb 28, 1929	18 years, 225 days	New Broadway A.C., Philadelphia, Pennsylvania, U.S.	
65	Win	59–5–1	Ruby Bradley	PTS	10	Feb 18, 1929	18 years, 215 days	Coliseum, Toronto, Quebec, Canada	
64	Draw	58–5–1	Phil Tobias	PTS	10	Feb 11, 1929	18 years, 208 days	Broadway Arena, Brooklyn, New York City, New York, U.S.	
63	Win	58–5	Phil Tobias	PTS	8	Jan 26, 1929	18 years, 192 days	Olympia A.C., Philadelphia, Pennsylvania, U.S.	
62	Win	57–5	Marty Gold	PTS	8	Jan 14, 1929	18 years, 180 days	Waltz Dream Arena, Atlantic City, New Jersey, U.S.	
61	Win	56–5	Frisco Grande	PTS	8	Dec 20, 1928	18 years, 155 days	New Broadway A.C., Philadelphia, Pennsylvania, U.S.	
60	Win	55–5	Marty Gold	PTS	10	Dec 3, 1928	18 years, 138 days	Coliseum, Toronto, Quebec, Canada	
59	Loss	54–5	Phil Tobias	PTS	10	Nov 19, 1928	18 years, 124 days	Broadway Arena, Brooklyn, New York City, New York, U.S.	
58	Win	54–4	Lew Goldberg	PTS	8	Oct 11, 1928	18 years, 85 days	New Broadway A.C., Philadelphia, Pennsylvania, U.S.	
57	Win	53–4	Steve Cole	PTS	10	Sep 7, 1928	18 years, 51 days	Fair Grounds Arena, Allentown, Pennsylvania, U.S.	Retained USA Pennsylvania State flyweight title
56	Win	52–4	Phil Tobias	PTS	8	Aug 22, 1928	18 years, 35 days	Bacharach Ball Park, Atlantic City, New Jersey, U.S.	
55	Win	51–4	Phil Tobias	NWS	10	Jul 30, 1928	18 years, 12 days	Jersey City, New Jersey, U.S.	
54	Win	50–4	Battling Griffin	UD	8	Jun 28, 1928	17 years, 346 days	New Broadway A.C., Philadelphia, Pennsylvania, U.S.	Retained USA Pennsylvania State flyweight title
53	Win	49–4	Jose Allano	NWS	10	Jun 21, 1928	17 years, 339 days	Atlantic City, New Jersey, U.S.	
52	Win	48–4	Willie Davies	PTS	10	May 28, 1928	17 years, 315 days	Arena, Philadelphia, Pennsylvania, U.S.	Won vacant USA Pennsylvania State flyweight title
51	Win	47–4	Charley Rogers	PTS	8	May 4, 1928	17 years, 291 days	Wildwood, New Jersey, U.S.	Date needs verification
50	Win	46–4	Ernie Peters	NWS	10	Apr 27, 1928	17 years, 284 days	Fort Wayne, Indiana, U.S.	
49	Win	45–4	George Burns	KO	4 (8)	Apr 20, 1928	17 years, 277 days	Dance Arena, Wildwood, New Jersey, U.S.	
48	Win	44–4	Charley Kid Royer	KO	3 (8)	Apr 13, 1928	17 years, 270 days	Dance Arena, Wildwood, New Jersey, U.S.	
47	Win	43–4	Battling Griffin	PTS	8	Mar 26, 1928	17 years, 252 days	Waltz Dream Arena, Atlantic City, New Jersey, U.S.	
46	Win	42–4	Willie Davies	SD	10	Feb 20, 1928	17 years, 217 days	Motor Square Garden, Pittsburgh, Pennsylvania, U.S.	
45	Loss	41–4	Billy Kelly	UD	10	Jan 23, 1928	17 years, 189 days	Town Hall, Scranton, Pennsylvania, U.S.	For vacant USA Pennsylvania State flyweight title
44	Win	41–3	Marty Gold	SD	10	Jan 16, 1928	17 years, 182 days	Arena, Philadelphia, Pennsylvania, U.S.	
43	Win	40–3	Matty White	PTS	10	Dec 15, 1927	17 years, 150 days	New Broadway A.C., Philadelphia, Pennsylvania, U.S.	
42	Win	39–3	Danny Flores	NWS	8	Dec 8, 1927	17 years, 143 days	Waltz Dream Arena, Atlantic City, New Jersey, U.S.	
41	Win	38–3	Willie Davies	MD	10	Nov 3, 1927	17 years, 108 days	New Broadway A.C., Philadelphia, Pennsylvania, U.S.	
40	Win	37–3	Young Chappie	PTS	10	Oct 6, 1927	17 years, 80 days	New Broadway A.C., Philadelphia, Pennsylvania, U.S.	
39	Win	36–3	Sammy Tucker	NWS	8	Aug 17, 1927	17 years, 30 days	Dog Track, Atlantic City, New Jersey, U.S.	
38	Loss	35–3	Willie Davies	NWS	8	Aug 1, 1927	17 years, 14 days	Waltz Dream Arena, Atlantic City, New Jersey, U.S.	
37	Win	35–2	Sammy Tucker	NWS	8	Jun 6, 1927	16 years, 323 days	Waltz Dream Arena, Atlantic City, New Jersey, U.S.	
36	Win	34–2	Jose Allano	MD	8	May 10, 1927	16 years, 296 days	Chestnut Street Auditorium, Harrisburg, Pennsylvania, U.S.	
35	Win	33–2	Pussy Walker	PTS	8	May 5, 1927	16 years, 291 days	Olympia A.C., Philadelphia, Pennsylvania, U.S.	
34	Win	32–2	Isadore Schwartz	NWS	8	May 2, 1927	16 years, 288 days	Waltz Dream Arena, Atlantic City, New Jersey, U.S.	
33	Win	31–2	Eddie Covington	PTS	8	Apr 26, 1927	16 years, 282 days	Chestnut Street Auditorium, Harrisburg, Pennsylvania, U.S.	
32	Win	30–2	Eddie Covington	PTS	8	Apr 23, 1927	16 years, 279 days	Olympia A.C., Philadelphia, Pennsylvania, U.S.	
31	Win	29–2	Eddie Covington	NWS	8	Apr 4, 1927	16 years, 260 days	Waltz Dream Arena, Atlantic City, New Jersey, U.S.	
30	Win	28–2	Jose Allano	PTS	8	Mar 24, 1927	16 years, 249 days	Olympia A.C., Philadelphia, Pennsylvania, U.S.	
29	Win	27–2	Pussy Walker	PTS	6	Jan 1, 1927	16 years, 167 days	Arena, Philadelphia, Pennsylvania, U.S.	
28	Win	26–2	Jose Allano	NWS	8	Dec 20, 1926	16 years, 155 days	Waltz Dream Arena, Atlantic City, New Jersey, U.S.	
27	Win	25–2	Pussy Walker	NWS	6	Nov 18, 1926	16 years, 123 days	Waltz Dream Arena, Atlantic City, New Jersey, U.S.	
26	Win	24–2	Jimmy Britt	PTS	6	Nov 5, 1926	16 years, 110 days	Cambria A.C., Philadelphia, Pennsylvania, U.S.	
25	Win	23–2	Pussy Walker	PTS	6	Oct 15, 1926	16 years, 89 days	Cambria A.C., Philadelphia, Pennsylvania, U.S.	
24	Win	22–2	Pussy Walker	NWS	8	Sep 27, 1926	16 years, 71 days	Waltz Dream Arena, Atlantic City, New Jersey, U.S.	
23	Win	21–2	Mickey King	PTS	6	Sep 17, 1926	16 years, 61 days	Cambria A.C., Philadelphia, Pennsylvania, U.S.	
22	Win	20–2	Pussy Walker	NWS	6	Aug 20, 1926	16 years, 33 days	Bacharach Ball Park, Atlantic City, New Jersey, U.S.	
21	Win	19–2	Charley Hoffman	TKO	3 (6)	Jul 30, 1926	16 years, 12 days	Bacharach Ball Park, Atlantic City, New Jersey, U.S.	
20	Win	18–2	Tony Angelo	NWS	6	Jul 16, 1926	15 years, 363 days	Bacharach Ball Park, Atlantic City, New Jersey, U.S.	
19	Win	17–2	Dick Welsh	NWS	6	Jun 25, 1926	15 years, 342 days	Bacharach Ball Park, Atlantic City, New Jersey, U.S.	
18	Win	16–2	Bob Henry	PTS	6	May 21, 1926	15 years, 307 days	Cambria A.C., Philadelphia, Pennsylvania, U.S.	
17	Win	15–2	Bobby Dechter	NWS	6	Apr 16, 1926	15 years, 272 days	Waltz Dream Arena, Atlantic City, New Jersey, U.S.	
16	Win	14–2	Tony Angelo	NWS	6	Apr 5, 1926	15 years, 261 days	Waltz Dream Arena, Atlantic City, New Jersey, U.S.	
15	Win	13–2	Billy Squires	PTS	8	Mar 29, 1926	15 years, 254 days	Arena, Philadelphia, Pennsylvania, U.S.	
14	Win	12–2	Bobby Dechter	PTS	6	Mar 4, 1926	15 years, 229 days	New Broadway A.C., Philadelphia, Pennsylvania, U.S.	
13	Win	11–2	Charley Bethel	NWS	6	Mar 1, 1926	15 years, 226 days	Waltz Dream Arena, Atlantic City, New Jersey, U.S.	
12	Win	10–2	Buddy Homan	NWS	6	Feb 15, 1926	15 years, 212 days	Waltz Dream Arena, Atlantic City, New Jersey, U.S.	
11	Win	9–2	Bobby Russell	PTS	6	Feb 4, 1926	15 years, 201 days	New Broadway A.C., Philadelphia, Pennsylvania, U.S.	
10	Win	8–2	Tony Angelo	KO	4 (6)	Jan 18, 1926	15 years, 184 days	Waltz Dream Arena, Atlantic City, New Jersey, U.S.	
9	Win	7–2	Billy Richards	PTS	6	Jan 14, 1926	15 years, 180 days	New Broadway A.C., Philadelphia, Pennsylvania, U.S.	
8	Win	6–2	Bobby Russell	NWS	6	Dec 28, 1925	15 years, 163 days	Waltz Dream Arena, Atlantic City, New Jersey, U.S.	
7	Win	5–2	Tony Angelo	PTS	4	Dec 10, 1925	15 years, 145 days	New Broadway A.C., Philadelphia, Pennsylvania, U.S.	
6	Loss	4–2	Dick Welsh	PTS	6	Nov 26, 1925	15 years, 131 days	New Broadway A.C., Philadelphia, Pennsylvania, U.S.	
5	Loss	4–1	Matty White	KO	2 (6)	Nov 6, 1925	15 years, 111 days	Cambria A.C., Philadelphia, Pennsylvania, U.S.	
4	Win	4–0	Charley Bethel	PTS	6	Nov 5, 1925	15 years, 110 days	New Broadway A.C., Philadelphia, Pennsylvania, U.S.	
3	Win	3–0	Charley Bethel	PTS	6	Oct 22, 1925	15 years, 96 days	New Broadway A.C., Philadelphia, Pennsylvania, U.S.	
2	Win	2–0	Al Klotz	TKO	4 (6)	Oct 15, 1925	15 years, 89 days	New Broadway A.C., Philadelphia, Pennsylvania, U.S.	
1	Win	1–0	Al Ketchel	PTS	6	Oct 8, 1925	15 years, 82 days	New Broadway A.C., Philadelphia, Pennsylvania, U.S.	

Achievements
Vacant Title last held by Corporal Izzy Schwartz	NYSAC World Flyweight Champion; March 21, 1930 – September 16, 1935	Succeeded by Small Montana
