= Motee "Kid" Singh =

Indo-Guyanese boxer (1909-1971)

Kid Singh
Personal information
- Nickname: The Fighting Rajah
- Nationality: Guyanese
- Born: Motee Singh; May 13, 1909 Berbice, Guyana
- Died: 1971 (aged 61–62) London, England
- Weight: Featherweight

Boxing career

Boxing record
- Total fights: 59;
- Wins: 33
- Win by KO: 18
- Losses: 21
- Draws: 5
- No contests: 0

Motee Singh (May 13, 1909 – 1971), known professionally as Kid Singh, was an Indo-Guyanese professional boxer who competed from the 1920s to 1938.

== Early life ==
Motee Singh was born in Berbice, British Guiana (now Guyana), on May 13, 1909.

His love for boxing began in childhood, leading him to enter amateur bouts after school, determined to make it his profession. According to Singh, "When my father heard that, he was angry, but I was determined not to be turned from my ambition, so I left home." The West Indian teenager left home to pursue a career as a prizefighter.

He became a protégé of former heavyweight title contender Harry Wills, who, after refereeing one of his bouts, brought him to New York. Wills had mentored fighters while also embarking on occasional exhibition tours around the world. Singh recalled, "I fought an exhibition with a light heavyweight, Fighting Eddie, and Harry Wills was so impressed with me that he took me in hand. Wills took me to America, and that was the real beginning of my rise in the game."

== Career ==
Under the tutelage of Harry Wills, Singh made his professional debut in 1929 and fought until 1938. His early New York bouts were held in arenas in Queens, Brooklyn, Harlem, and Yonkers. First billed as the 'flyweight champion of the Far East,' his ring name became the 'Fighting Rajah.'

Competing in Madison Square Garden's flyweight championship tournament, he fought Midget Wolgast in December 1929 at Harlem's Olympia Boxing Club. It was a semi-final elimination bout for a shot against Cuban boxer Eladio "Black Bill" Valdés for the vacant world title. Singh floored Wolgast in the third but lost on points, still adjusting to American boxing after ten months in the country.

Seeking bouts, he accompanied his manager, Harry Wills, on a trip to the Berkshires and attended a Pittsfield fight card in October 1931.

The featherweight puncher's first New Jersey ring appearance came in February 1932 at the Masonic Auditorium on a card organized by Maurice Cruls.

His expired U.S. labor permit prevented him from fulfilling fight contracts with Archie Bell and Bushy Graham. He entered Ted Denver's training camp in Liverpool in May 1932, training with Dick Burke and Ginger Foran. Promoter Johnny Best aimed to match him against a top British boxer at Anfield, the stadium of Liverpool F.C. By then, he had fought 46 times, losing only six and boasted never being knocked out as a professional. Singh, similar in height and build to Panama Al Brown, stayed fit and boxed at high speed.

Kid Singh became Nel Tarleton's sparring partner in Aughton during summer 1932, helping him improve his speed for a match against Al Brown at Anfield.

He competed in a string of bouts in England, taking English fight fans by storm, before setting his sights on South Africa. The flyweight contender received an offer to fight in Natal, South Africa, on March 18, 1933.

Becoming the first Guyanese boxer to fight in South Africa, he made stops in Johannesburg, Cape Town, and Durban throughout 1933. In Durban on July 8, 1933, he competed against George Frenchman in a South African boxing tournament. Manilal Gandhi (and his wife), A.I. Kajee, and Albert Christopher were in attendance. He later signed to fight Mannie Dixon, the world featherweight champion of the West Indies. Kid Singh went on to capture the Indian featherweight title on April 10, 1934, at the Durban Town Hall. He agreed to defend the £150 gold featherweight championship belt he received early the next year. Of his six bouts in South Africa, he claimed four victories by knockout and two by decision. When invited to India, he declined and returned to England.

Following a successful tour of South Africa, he returned to Liverpool in May 1934 and rejoined the Foran camp under manager Ted Danvir. Upon his July return to the ring, he competed in three fights within the month—two at Liverpool Stadium and one at Anfield.

He traveled to Port of Spain, Trinidad and Tobago in April 1935. In his first scheduled fight, he was defeated by Al Tunney, Trinidad's featherweight title-holder, in a 10-round decision. In June 1935, the Indian featherweight champion defeated South Trinidad's "Siparia Tiger," Neville Marcano. After knocking him down three times, he secured a first-round TKO. In July, Singh suffered another loss at the hands of Al Tunney in their rematch at Woodbrook Stadium.

The much-travelled boxer fought in Georgetown, Guyana, in front of 5,000 spectators in 1936.

In one of his last bouts on February 9, 1938, he lost a 10-round decision to Chick Jones. His last fight came a month later at Hammersmith Stadium, where Bobby Nicholes defeated him by TKO.

Retiring in 1939, Singh later flew for Spain in the war.

== Death ==
Motee Singh died in London, England, in 1971.
