= Cienega de Escobar =

Ciénega de Escobar
- Town
- Location in Mexico
- Coordinates: 25°36′34″N 105°44′45″W
- Country: Mexico
- State: Durango

Population (2005)
  - Total: 135

Ciénega de Escobar is a small village in the state of Durango, Mexico.
