= Rodolfo Casanova =

Mexican boxer (1915–1980)

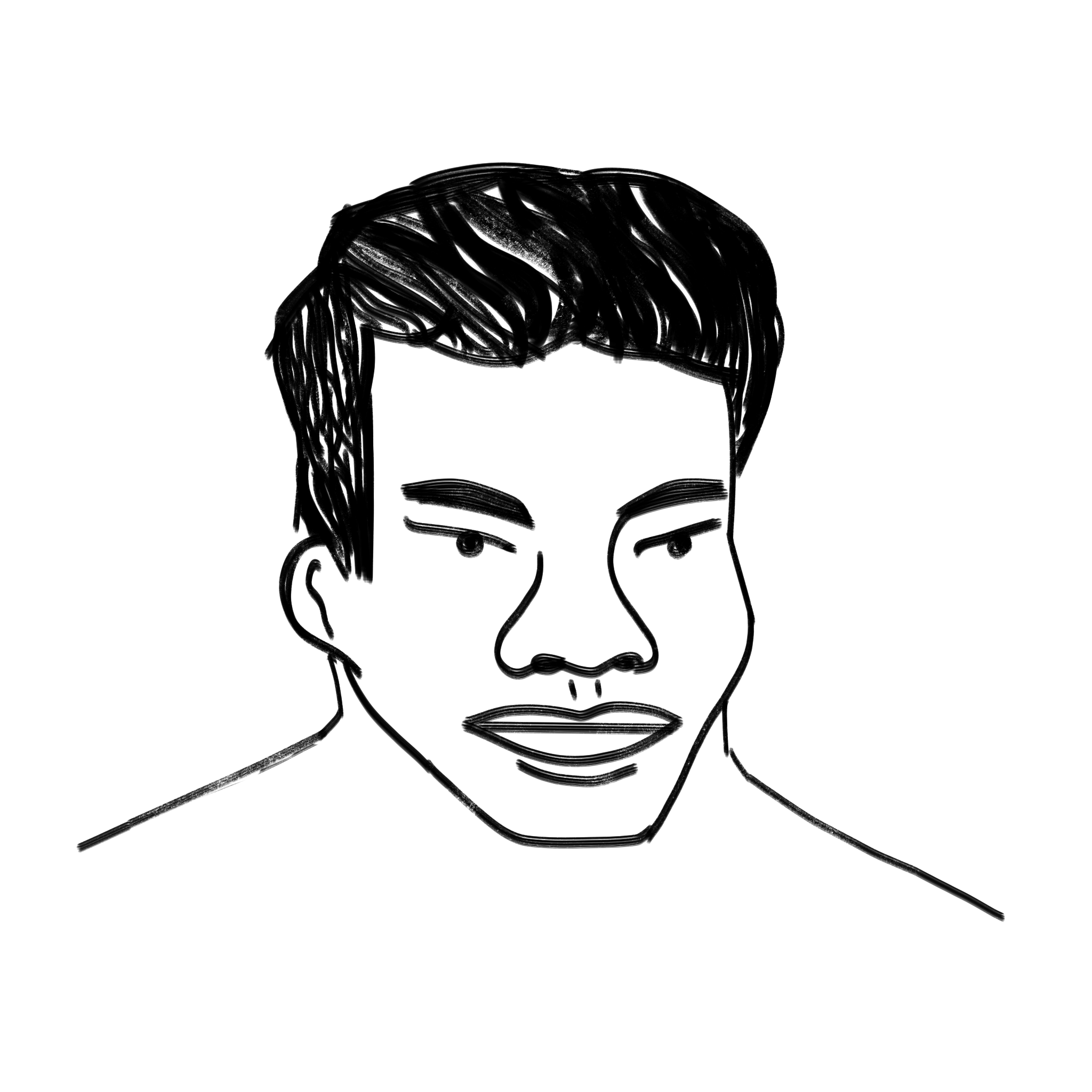

Personal information
- Nickname: Baby
- Born: Rodolfo Casanova; June 21, 1915 León, Guanajuato, Mexico
- Died: November 23, 1980 (aged 65)
- Height: 5 ft 4 in (163 cm)
- Weight: Lightweight; Featherweight; Super bantamweight Bantamweight

Boxing career
- Reach: 67 in (170 cm)
- Stance: Orthodox

Boxing record
- Total fights: 75
- Wins: 57
- Win by KO: 31
- Losses: 17
- Draws: 1

Rodolfo Casanova, also known as Baby Casanova or Chango Casanova (June 21, 1915 – November 23, 1980) was a Mexican professional boxer. He was also the first Mexican to fight a Puerto Rican in the Mexico – Puerto Rico boxing rivalry.

== Early life ==
Rodolfo was born during the Mexican Revolution, his father Don Rafael Casanova died in that war. His mother moved the family to Mexico City after the death. Casanova grew up very poor and started boxing only after his older brother Carlos, an amateur boxer, had no official government backing to attend the 1928 Summer Olympics.

== Professional career ==
=== World Bantamweight Championship ===
In his first attempt at a world title, Casanova lost to Sixto Escobar the World Bantamweight Champion. This would be the first world title fight between a Mexican and a Puerto Rican.
