= Pablo Dano =

Filipino boxer

Personal information
- Nationality: Filipino
- Born: July 12, 1908 Bato, Leyte, Philippines
- Died: November 23, 1994 (aged 86)
- Height: 1.55 m (5 ft 1 in)
- Weight: Bantamweight

Boxing career
- Reach: 157 cm (62 in)

Boxing record
- Total fights: 212
- Wins: 114
- Losses: 58
- Draws: 39

Pablo Dano, born on July 12, 1908, in Bato, Leyte, Philippines, was a Filipino boxer. He competed in boxing competitions from 1924 to 1941 in the Philippines and the USA.

== Professional career ==
Born in Bato, Leyte, Philippines, Dano began professional boxing in 1924 at the age of 16. In 1927, he went to the USA to continue his boxing career.

While Dano never secured a world title, he claimed the California State World Bantamweight title in 1935 by defeating Filipino boxer Young Tommy. Dano also defended this title from another Filipino boxer Speedy Dado.

Dano had his final boxing fight in 1941. In his 212 total fights, he had 114 wins, 58 losses, and 39 draws.

== Professional boxing record ==
212 fights	114 wins	58 losses
By knockout	37	0
By decision	77	57
By disqualification	0	1
Draws	39	
No contests	1	

No.	Result	Record	Opponent	Type	Round, time	Date	Location	Notes
212	Loss	114–58–39 (1)	Billy Banks	PTS	6	8 Apr 1941	Uline Arena, Washington, D.C., U.S.	
211	Loss	114–57–39 (1)	Bobby Green	PTS	10	31 Jan 1941	Cambria A.C., Philadelphia, Pennsylvania, U.S.	
210	Loss	114–56–39 (1)	Curley Nichols	PTS	8	14 Jan 1941	Broadway Arena, New York City, New York, U.S.	
209	Loss	114–55–39 (1)	Tommy Forte	UD	10	13 Dec 1940	Cambria A.C., Philadelphia, Pennsylvania, U.S.	
208	Loss	114–54–39 (1)	Aurel Toma	PTS	10	7 Nov 1940	Municipal Auditorium, Savannah, Georgia, U.S.	
207	Loss	114–53–39 (1)	Joey Iannotti	PTS	8	31 Oct 1940	Arena, New Haven, Connecticut, U.S.	
206	Loss	114–52–39 (1)	Joey Iannotti	PTS	8	12 Aug 1940	Starlight Park, New York City, New York, U.S.	
205	Win	114–51–39 (1)	Joey Iannotti	KO	6 (8), 2:33	29 Jul 1940	Starlight Park, New York City, New York, U.S.	The match ended at 2:38 according to a record journal
204	Loss	113–51–39 (1)	Lou Barbetta	PTS	8	23 Jul 1940	Queensboro Arena, New York City, New York, U.S.	
203	Draw	113–50–39 (1)	Johnny Juliano	PTS	8	15 Jul 1940	Belmont Park, Garfield, New Jersey, U.S.	
202	Loss	113–50–38 (1)	Joe Marinelli	PTS	10	17 Jun 1940	Laurel Garden, Newark, New Jersey, U.S.	
201	Draw	113–49–38 (1)	Nat Litfin	PTS	8	27 May 1940	St. Nicholas Arena, New York City, New York, U.S.	
200	Loss	113–49–37 (1)	Georgie Pace	PTS	10	1 May 1940	Golden Gate Arena, New York City, New York, U.S.	
199	Loss	113–48–37 (1)	Vince Dell'Orto	PTS	8	20 Apr 1940	Ridegwood Grove, New York City, New York, U.S.	
198	Draw	113–47–37 (1)	Frankie Bove	PTS	8	15 Apr 1940	Laurel Garden, Newark, New Jersey, U.S.	
197	Loss	113–47–36 (1)	Johnny Marcelline	MD	10	5 Apr 1940	Cambria A.C., Philadelphia, Pennsylvania, U.S.	
196	Draw	113–46–36 (1)	Morris Parker	PTS	8	23 Mar 1940	Ridgewood Grove, New York City, New York, U.S.	
195	Draw	113–46–35 (1)	Angelo Callura	PTS	8	15 Feb 1940	Fair Grounds Coliseum, Detroit, Michigan, U.S.	
194	Draw	113–46–34 (1)	Joe Marinelli	PTS	8	5 Feb 1940	Laurel Garden, Newark, New Jersey, U.S.	
193	Win	113–46–33 (1)	Aurel Toma	PTS	10	23 Apr 1940	Broadway Arena, New York City, New York, U.S.	
192	Draw	112–46–33 (1)	Aurel Toma	PTS	8	2 Jan 1940	Broadway Arena, New York City, New York, U.S.	
191	Loss	112–46–32 (1)	Allie Stolz	PTS	8	26 Dec 1939	Broadway Arena, New York City, New York, U.S.	
190	Win	112–45–32 (1)	Minnie DeMore	PTS	8	18 Dec 1939	St. Nicholas Arena, New York City, New York, U.S.	
189	Loss	111–45–32 (1)	Maxie Shapiro	PTS	8	20 Nov 1939	St. Nicholas Arena, New York City, New York, U.S.	
188	Loss	111–44–32 (1)	Armando Sicilia	UD	8	30 Oct 1939	Turner's Arena, Washington, D.C., U.S.	
187	Win	111–43–32 (1)	Nat Litfin	PTS	8	16 Oct 1939	St. Nicholas Arena, New York City, New York, U.S.	
186	Loss	110–43–32 (1)	KO Morgan	PTS	10	6 Oct 1939	Stamford, Connecticut, U.S.	
185	Win	110–42–32 (1)	Al Mancini	PTS	8	21 Aug 1939	Griffith Stadium, Washington, D.C., U.S.	
184	Loss	109–42–32 (1)	Al Mancini	PTS	8	7 Aug 1939	Coney Island Velodrome, New York City, New York, U.S.	
183	Loss	109–41–32 (1)	Bobby Green	PTS	10	31 Jul 1939	Arena Stadium, Philadelphia, Pennsylvania, U.S.	
182	Win	109–40–32 (1)	Sammy Garcia	PTS	8	6 Jul 1939	Fort Hamilton Arena, New York City, New York, U.S.	
181	Win	108–40–32 (1)	Ray Sharkey	PTS	10	9 Jun 1939	Public Hall, Cleveland, Ohio, U.S.	
180	Win	107–40–32 (1)	Vito Mangine	TKO	1 (8), 2:25	1 May 1939	Public Hall, Cleveland, Ohio, U.S.	
179	Win	106–40–32 (1)	Gussie Smallwood	KO	4 (6), 2:13	21 Mar 1939	Public Hall, Cleveland, Ohio, U.S.	
178	Win	105–40–32 (1)	Louis Laurie	SD	8	1 Mar 1939	Arena, Cleveland, Ohio, U.S.	
177	Loss	104–40–32 (1)	Henry Hook	PTS	10	23 Jan 1939	Maple Leaf Gardens, Toronto, Canada	
176	Win	104–39–32 (1)	Louis Laurie	PTS	10	16 Jan 1939	Arena, Cleveland, Ohio, U.S.	
175	Win	103–39–32 (1)	Jesse Levels	PTS	10	20 Dec 1938	Arena, Cleveland, Ohio, U.S.	
174	Loss	102–39–32 (1)	Umio Gen	PTS	10	22 Nov 1938	Arena, Cleveland, Ohio, U.S.	
173	Loss	102–38–32 (1)	Henry Hook	PTS	10	10 Nov 1938	Arena, Cleveland, Ohio, U.S	
172	Win	102–37–32 (1)	Young Joe Roche	PTS	10	4 Oct 1938	Olympic Auditorium, Los Angeles, California, U.S.	
171	Loss	102–37–32 (1)	Bobby Leyvas	PTS	10	27 Sep 1938	Civic Auditrorium, Los Angeles, California, U.S.	
170	Loss	101–36–32 (1)	Louis Salica	PTS	10	12 Aug 1938	Gilmore Stadium, Los Angeles, California, U.S.	
169	Loss	101–35–32 (1)	Richie Lemos	PTS	10	15 Jul 1938	Gilmore Stadium, Los Angeles, California, U.S.	
168	Win	101–34–32 (1)	Manuel Ortiz	PTS	6	5 Jul 1938	Olympic Auditorium, Los Angeles, California, U.S.	
167	Loss	100–34–32 (1)	Chick Delaney	PTS	10	6 Jun 1938	Memorial Civic Auditorium, Stockton, California, U.S.	
166	Loss	100–33–32 (1)	Johnny Brown	PTS	10	20 May 1938	Gilmore Stadium, Los Angeles, California, U.S.	
165	Draw	100–32–32 (1)	Bobby Leyvas	TD	5 (10)	26 Apr 1938	Memorial Auditorium, Sacramento, California, U.S.	
164	Draw	100–32–31 (1)	Tomboy Romero	PTS	10	14 Apr 1938	Legion Stadium, Los Angeles, California, U.S.	
163	Loss	100–32–30 (1)	Johnny Brown	PTS	10	11 Feb 1938	Legion Stadium, Los Angeles, California, U.S.	
162	Loss	100–31–30 (1)	Tomboy Romero	PTS	10	18 Jan 1938	Civic Auditorium, San Jose, California, U.S.	
161	Win	100–30–30 (1)	Eddie Spina	PTS	10	7 Jan 1938	Auditorium, Portland, Oregon, U.S.	
160	Win	99–30–30 (1)	Bobby Leyvas	PTS	10	1 Jan 1938	Pismo Beach Arena, Pismo Beach, California, U.S.	
159	Win	98–30–30 (1)	Al Spina	KO	2 (10)	30 Nov 1937	Auditorium, Portland, Oregon, U.S.	
158	Win	97–30–30 (1)	Matty Matthewson	KO	6 (10)	20 Nov 1937	Armory, Portland, Oregon, U.S.	
157	Draw	96–30–30 (1)	Jimmy Perrin	PTS	10	12 Nov 1937	Legion Stadium, Los Angeles, California, U.S.	
156	Win	96–30–29 (1)	Umio Gen	PTS	10	5 Oct 1937	Civic Auditorium, San Jose, California, U.S.	
155	Win	95–30–29 (1)	Umio Gen	PTS	10	24 Sep 1937	Legion Stadium, Los Angeles, California, U.S.	
154	Win	94–30–29 (1)	Angus Smith	PTS	8	3 Sep 1937	Coliseum, San Diego, California, U.S.	
153	Win	93–30–29 (1)	Bobby Leyvas	PTS	10	20 Aug 1937	Legion Stadium, Los Angeles, California, U.S.	
152	Draw	92–30–29 (1)	Clarence Babe Spencer	PTS	10	14 Jul 1937	Civic Auditorium, Watsonville, California, U.S.	
151	Win	92–30–28 (1)	Frankie Covelli	PTS	10	2 Jul 1937	Legion Stadium, Los Angeles, California, U.S.	
150	Loss	91–30–28 (1)	Horace Mann	PTS	10	25 May 1937	Civic Auditorium, San Jose, California, U.S.	
149	Win	91–29–28 (1)	Frankie Castillo	TKO	6 (10)	19 May 1937	Pasadena Arena, Pasadena, California, U.S.	
148	Draw	90–29–28 (1)	Horace Mann	PTS	10	4 May 1937	Civic Auditorium, San Jose, California, U.S.	
147	Win	90–29–27 (1)	Danny LaVerne	PTS	10	27 Apr 1937	D.A.V. Arena, Modesto, California, U.S.	
146	Loss	89–29–27 (1)	Bobby Leyvas	PTS	10	1 Jan 1937	Pismo Beach Arena, Pismo Beach, California, U.S.	
145	Win	89–28–27 (1)	Al Spina	KO	7 (10)	25 Nov 1936	Auditorium, Oakland, California, U.S.	
144	Win	88–28–27 (1)	Chico Romo	PTS	10	10 Nov 1936	Olympic Auditorium, Los Angeles, California, U.S.	
143	Win	87–28–27 (1)	Dommy Ganzon	PTS	10	6 Nov 1936	Pismo Beach Arena, Pismo Beach, California, U.S.	
142	Loss	86–28–27 (1)	Tomboy Romero	PTS	10	20 Oct 1936	D.A.V. Arena, Modesto, California, U.S.	
141	Loss	86–27–27 (1)	Fillo Echevarría	PTS	10	29 Aug 1936	Havana, La Habana Province, Cuba	
140	Draw	86–26–27 (1)	Barney Duran	PTS	10	4 Jul 1936	Stockton, California, U.S.	
139	Win	86–26–26 (1)	Al Romero	PTS	10	26 Jun 1936	Coliseum, San Diego, California, U.S.	
138	Loss	85–26–26 (1)	Henry Hook	PTS	10	29 May 1936	Pismo Beach Arena, Pismo Beach, California, U.S.	
137	Loss	85–25–26 (1)	Baby Arizmendi	PTS	10	5 May 1936	Olympic Auditorium, Los Angeles, California, U.S.	
136	Draw	85–24–26 (1)	Bobby Leyvas	PTS	10	3 Apr 1936	Pismo Beach Arena, Pismo Beach, California, U.S.	
135	Win	85–24–25 (1)	Midget Martinez	PTS	10	28 Feb 1936	Coliseum, San Diego, California, U.S.	
134	Win	84–24–25 (1)	John Patrick Donahue	TKO	4 (10)	19 Feb 1936	Auditorium, Oakland, California, U.S.	
133	Loss	83–24–25 (1)	Dick Welsh	PTS	10	24 Jan 1926	Legion Stadium, Los Angeles, California, U.S.	
132	Win	83–23–25 (1)	José Fino	PTS	6	17 Jan 1936	Ventura A.C., Ventura, California, U.S.	
131	Win	82–23–25 (1)	Baby Palmore	TKO	6 (8)	3 Jan 1936	Memorial Civic Auditorium, Stockton, California, U.S.	
130	Win	81–23–25 (1)	Henry Hook	PTS	10	6 Dec 1935	Legion Stadium, Los Angeles, California, U.S.	
129	Win	80–23–25 (1)	Frankie Castillo	PTS	10	15 Nov 1935	Legion Stadium, Los Angeles, California, U.S.	
128	Loss	79–23–25 (1)	Bobby Leyvas	PTS	10	4 Oct 1935	Legion Stadium, Los Angeles, California, U.S.	
127	Win	79–22–25 (1)	Fillo Echevarría	PTS	10	20 Sep 1935	Legion Stadium, Los Angeles, California, U.S.	
126	Win	78–22–25 (1)	Matty Matthewson	PTS	10	27 Aug 1935	Ryan's Auditorium, Fresno, California, U.S.	
125	Draw	77–22–25 (1)	Young Tommy	TD	10 (10)	25 Jul 1935	Memorial Auditorium, Scaramento, California, U.S.	
124	Win	77–22–24 (1)	Joe Tei Ken	TKO	5 (10)	12 Jul 1935	Watsonville, California, U.S.	
123	Win	76–22–24 (1)	Frankie Covelli	PTS	10	5 Jul 1935	Legion Stadium, Los Angeles, California, U.S.	
122	Loss	75–22–24 (1)	Louis Salica	PTS	10	11 Jun 1935	Olympic Auditorium, Los Angeles, California, U.S.	Lost CSAC bantamweight title; (not recognized by the NBA)
121	Win	75–21–24 (1)	Speedy Dado	PTS	10	21 May 1935	Olympic Auditorium, Los Angeles, California, U.S.	Retained CSAC bantamweight title (not recognized by the NBA)
120	Win	74–21–24 (1)	Chalky Wright	KO	2 (10)	10 May 1935	Civic Auditorium, Sacramento, California, U.S.	
119	Draw	73–21–24 (1)	Speedy Dado	PTS	10	30 Apr 1935	Olympic Auditorium, Los Angeles, California, U.S.	
118	Win	73–21–23 (1)	Tony Marino	PTS	10	11 Apr 1935	Memorial Auditorium, Sacramento, California, U.S.	
117	Win	72–21–23 (1)	Young Tommy	TKO	8 (10), 0:48	26 Mar 1935	Olympic Auditorium, Los Angeles, California, U.S.	Won vacant CSAC bantamweight title; (not recognized by fhe NBA); Dick Donald sanctioned it anyway, the "Daro Belt" was given to Dano by Bud Taylor as he won the bout
116	Win	71–21–23 (1)	Bobby Olivas	TKO	4 (10)	5 Mar 1935	Olympic Auditorium, Los Angeles, California, U.S.	
115	Win	70–21–23 (1)	Henry Moreno	PTS	10	29 Jan 1935	Olympic Auditorium, Los Angeles, California, U.S.	
114	Win	69–21–23 (1)	Joey Dodge	TKO	9 (10)	16 Jan 1935	Long Beach Municipal Auditorium, Long Beach, California, U.S.	
113	Loss	68–21–23 (1)	Juan Zurita	UD	10	4 Jan 1935	Legion Stadium, Los Angeles, California, U.S.	
112	Win	68–20–23 (1)	Tony Marino	PTS	10	7 Dec 1934	Watsonville, California, U.S.	
111	Draw	67–20–23 (1)	Midget Wolgast	PTS	10	27 Nov 1934	Olympic Auditorium, Los Angeles, California, U.S.	
110	Win	67–20–22 (1)	Midget Wolgast	PTS	10	9 Nov 1934	Legion Stadium, Los Angeles, California, U.S.	
109	Win	66–20–22 (1)	Johnny Pena	PTS	10	11 Oct 1934	L Street Arena, Sacramento, California, U.S.	
108	Win	65–20–22 (1)	Joe Martin	KO	1 (10)	27 Sep 1934	Memorial Civic Auditorium, Stockton, California, U.S.	
107	Win	64–20–22 (1)	Peppy Sanchez	PTS	6	11 Sep 1934	Olympic Auditorium, Los Angeles, California, U.S.	
106	Win	63–20–22 (1)	Frankie Murray	PTS	10	3 Sep 1934	Watsonville, California, U.S.	
105	Win	62–20–22 (1)	Al Austin	KO	2 (10), 0:56	28 Aug 1934	Ryan's Auditorium, Fresno, California, U.S.	
104	Win	61–20–22 (1)	Joey Dodge	PTS	10	21 Aug 1934	Ryan's Auditorium, Fresno, California, U.S.	
103	Win	60–20–22 (1)	Young Sport	TKO	8 (10)	6 Aug 1934	Bakersfield Arena, Bakersfield, California, U.S.	
102	Win	59–20–22 (1)	Matty Matthewson	TKO	6 (10)	26 Jul 1934	Memorial Auditorium, Sacramento, California, U.S.	
101	Win	58–20–22 (1)	Bobby Olivas	PTS	10	4 Jul 1934	Pismo Beach Arena, Pismo Beach, California, U.S.	
100	Win	57–20–22 (1)	Billy McLeod	TKO	8 (10)	28 Jun 1934	Memorial Civic Auditorium, Stockton, California, U.S.	
99	Win	56–20–22 (1)	Kid Ray	PTS	8	11 Jun 1934	Memorial Civic Auditorium, Stockton, California, U.S.	
98	Win	55–20–22 (1)	Peppy Sanchez	PTS	10	29 May 1934	Civic Auditorium, Watsonville, California, U.S.	
97	Win	54–20–22 (1)	Lew Farber	PTS	10	18 May 1934	Pismo Beach Arena, Pismo Beach, California, U.S.	
96	Win	53–20–22 (1)	Augie Ruggierre	TKO	6 (10)	27 Apr 1934	Civic Auditorium, Watsonville, California, U.S.	
95	Draw	52–20–22 (1)	Little Pancho	PTS	10	9 Mar 1934	Pismo Beach Arena, Pismo Beach, California, U.S.	
94	Loss	52–20–21 (1)	Lew Farber	PTS	10	22 Feb 1934	Pismo Beach Arena, Pismo Beach, California, U.S.	
93	Loss	52–19–21 (1)	Little Pancho	PTS	10	17 Jan 1934	Dreamland Auditorium, San Francisco, California, U.S.	
92	Win	52–18–21 (1)	Joe Tei Ken	PTS	10	1 Jan 1934	Pismo Beach Arena, Pismo Beach, California, U.S.	
91	NC	51–18–21 (1)	Richard Kuratsu	NC	6 (8)	6 Oct 1933	Houston Arena, Honolulu, Hawaii, U.S.	
90	Win	51–18–21	Quon Kam	PTS	8	28 Sep 1933	Wailuku Stadium, Wailuku, Hawaii, U.S.	
89	Loss	50–18–21	Young Gildo	PTS	12	18 Mar 1933	Olympic Stadium, Manila, Philippines	
88	Draw	50–17–21	Joe Grande	PTS	4	18 Feb 1933	Olympic Stadium, Manila, Philippines	
87	Win	50–17–20	Louis Gallup	PTS	12	31 Dec 1932	Olympic Stadium, Manila, Philippines	
86	Loss	49–17–20	Young Dumaluigas	PTS	15	19 Nov 1932	Olympic Stadium, Manila, Philippines	Lost Orient bantamweight title
85	Loss	49–16–20	Young Dumaguilas	PTS	12	1 Oct 1932	Olympic Stadium, Manila, Philippines	
84	Win	49–15–20	Alejandro Pasmore	PTS	10	17 Sep 1932	Olympic Stadium, Manila, Philippines	
83	Win	48–15–20	Freddy Buck	TKO	4 (12)	20 Aug 1932	Olympic Stadium, Manila, Philippines	
82	Win	47–15–20	Cris Pineda	PTS	15	30 Jul 1932	Olympic Stadium, Manila, Philippines	Won Orient bantamweight and Orient featherweight titles
81	Loss	46–15–20	Cris Pineda	PTS	12	18 Jun 1932	Olympic Stadium, Manila, Philippines	Lost Orient bantamweight title
80	Win	46–14–20	Kid Cameron	KO	6 (12)	28 May 1932	Olympic Stadium, Manila, Philippines	Won vacant Orient bantamweight title
79	Win	45–14–20	Spider Roach	PTS	12	22 Mar 1932	Leichhardt Stadium, Sydney, Australia	
78	Win	44–14–20	Young Gildo	PTS	15	18 Mar 1932	Leichhardt Stadium, Sydney, Australia	
77	Win	43–14–20	Al Singleton	KO	9 (15)	3 Mar 1932	Leichhardt Stadium, Sydney, Australia	
76	Win	42–14–20	Wally Walker	KO	5 (15)	19 Feb 1932	Leichhardt Stadium, Sydney, Australia	
75	Win	41–14–20	Ron Leonard	PTS	12	9 Feb 1932	Leichhardt Stadium, Sydney, Australia	
74	Win	40–14–20	Wally Walker	PTS	12	26 Jan 1932	Leichhardt Stadium, Sydney, Australia	
73	Win	39–14–20	Vic White	PTS	12	19 Jan 1932	Leichhardt Stadium, Sydney, Australia	
72	Win	38–14–20	Henry Kudo	KO	2 (10)	19 Dec 1931	Manila, Metro Manila, Philippines	
71	Win	37–14–20	Joe (Tiger) Connell	PTS	12	7 Nov 1931	Manila, Metro Manila, Philippines	
70	Win	36–14–20	Johnny Gabuco	KO	6 (12)	12 Sep 1931	Olympic Stadium, Manila, Philippines	
69	Draw	35–14–20	Joe Grande	PTS	10	8 Aug 1931	San Roque Stadium, Cavite City, Philippines	
68	Win	35–14–19	Little Abayan	PTS	12	27 Jun 1931	Olympic Stadium, Manila, Philippines	
67	Loss	34–14–19	Little Pancho	PTS	12	9 May 1931	Manila, Metro Manila, Philippines	For vacant Orient flyweight title
66	Draw	34–13–19	Little Pancho	PTS	12	22 Nov 1930	Manila, Metro Manila, Philippines	
65	Draw	34–13–18	Little Pancho	PTS	12	18 Oct 1930	Manila, Metro Manila, Philippines	
64	Loss	34–13–17	Young Tommy	PTS	12	30 Aug 1930	Manila, Metro Manila, Philippines	
63	Win	34–12–17	Young Sport	KO	2 (10)	31 May 1930	Pismo Beach Arena, Pismo Beach, California, U.S.	Won vacant Pacific Coast flyweight title
62	Loss	33–12–17	Newsboy Brown	PTS	10	20 May 1930	Olympic Auditorium, Los Angeles, California, U.S.	
61	Win	33–11–17	Johnny Jordan	KO	2 (10)	3 May 1930	Pismo Beach Arena, Pismo Beach, California, U.S.	
60	Win	32–11–17	Jim Campbell	PTS	6	11 Apr 1930	Olympia Stadium, Detroit, Michigan, U.S.	
59	Loss	31–11–17	Steve Rocco	PTS	10	28 Mar 1930	Toronto, Coliseum, Canada	
58	Win	31–10–17	Giovanni Sili	PTS	6	20 Mar 1930	Olympia Stadium, Detroit, Michigan, U.S.	
57	Loss	30–10–17	Steve Rocco	UD	10	24 Feb 1930	Coliseum, Toronto, Canada	
56	Win	30–9–17	Mickey Erno	TKO	6 (10)	1 Jan 1930	Pismo Beach Arena, Pismo Beach, California, U.S.	
55	Win	29–9–17	Jimmy Ketchell	TKO	3 (10)	18 Dec 1929	National Hall, San Francisco, California, U.S.	
54	Draw	28–9–17	Johnny O'Donnell	PTS	10	27 Nov 1928	National Hall, San Francisco, California, U.S.	
53	Win	28–9–16	Newsboy Brown	PTS	10	4 Oct 1929	Dreamland Auditorium, San Francisco, California, U.S.	
52	Win	27–9–16	Chato Laredo	PTS	10	7 Aug 1929	National Hall, San Francisco, California, U.S.	
51	Win	26–9–16	Frank Paluso	RTD	7 (10)	19 Jun 1929	National Hall, San Francisco, California, U.S.	
50	Win	25–9–16	Frank Paluso	PTS	10	22 May 1929	National Hall, San Francisco, California, U.S.	
49	Win	24–9–16	Willie LaMorte	PTS	10	26 Apr 1929	Dreamland Auditorium, San Francisco, California, U.S.	
48	Draw	23–9–16	Corporal Izzy Schwartz	PTS	10	19 Apr 1929	Dreamland Ballroom, San Francisco, California, U.S.	
47	Draw	23–9–15	Little Moro	PTS	15	8 Dec 1928	Manila, Metro Manila, Philippines	
46	Draw	23–9–14	Little Moro	PTS	12	6 Oct 1928	Manila, Metro Manila, Philippines	
45	Win	23–9–13	Faustino de Dios	TKO	3	15 Sep 1928	Manila, Metro Manila, Philippines	
44	Win	22–9–13	Joe Suzara	PTS	12	25 Aug 1928	Manila, Metro Manila, Philippines	
43	Win	21–9–13	Little Moro	PTS	12	11 Aug 1928	Olympic Stadium, Manila, Philippines	
42	Loss	20–9–13	Delos 'Kid' Williams	PTS	10	23 Mar 1928	L Street Arena, Sacramento, California, U.S.	
41	Loss	20–8–13	Frankie Murray	PTS	10	8 Mar 1928	Oak Park Arena, Stockton, California, U.S.	
40	Draw	20–7–13	Delos 'Kid' Williams	PTS	10	29 Feb 1928	National Hall, San Francisco, California, U.S.	
39	Draw	20–7–12	Frankie Murray	PTS	10	3 Feb 1928	L Street Arena, Sacramento, California, U.S.	
38	Loss	20–7–11	Delos 'Kid' Williams	DQ	4 (10)	15 Dec 1927	Stockton, California, U.S.	
37	Win	20–6–11	Benny Marks	PTS	10	7 Dec 1927	National Hall, San Francisco, California, U.S.	
36	Win	19–6–11	Frankie Murray	PTS	8	30 Nov 1927	National Hall, San Francisco, California, U.S.	
35	Loss	18–6–11	Johnny McCoy	PTS	10	5 Oct 1927	National Hall, San Francisco, California, U.S.	
34	Win	18–5–11	Al Robinson	TKO	4 (6)	23 Sep 1927	Golden Gate Arena, San Francisco, California, U.S.	
33	Win	17–5–11	Johnny Lario	KO	1 (6)	12 Aug 1927	Dreamland Rink, San Francisco, California, U.S.	
32	Win	16–5–11	Joe Velardi	PTS	6	14 Jul 1927	Stockton, California, U.S.	
31	Win	15–5–11	George Erne	PTS	6	30 Jun 1927	Stockton, California, U.S.	
30	Win	14–5–11	Joe Velardi	PTS	6	21 Sep 1927	Monarch A.C., San Francisco, California, U.S.	
29	Win	13–5–11	Lefty Shore	KO	3	24 May 1927	Monarch A.C., San Francisco, California, U.S.	
28	Win	12–5–11	George Leonard	TKO	3	10 May 1925	Monarch A.C., San Francisco, California, U.S.	
27	Win	11–5–11	Mickey Britton	PTS	4	3 May 1927	Monarch A.C., San Francisco, California, U.S.	
26	Loss	10–5–11	Speedy Dado	PTS	10	1 Jan 1927	Manila, Metro Manila, Philippines	
25	Draw	10–4–11	Speedy Dado	PTS	12	11 Dec 1926	Manila, Metro Manila, Philippines	
24	Draw	10–4–10	Boy Walley	PTS	12	30 Sep 1926	Happy World Arena, Singapore	For vacant Orient flyweight title
23	Draw	10–4–9	Boy Walley	PTS	12	3 Sep 1926	Happy World Arena, Singapore	For vacant Orient flyweight title
22	Win	10–4–8	Joe Suzara	PTS	12	26 Jun 1926	Manila, Metro Manila, Philippines	
21	Loss	9–4–8	Little Moro	PTS	12	1 May 1926	Cebu City, Cebu, Philippines	
20	Loss	9–3–8	Joe Suzara	PTS	10	21 Apr 1926	Pasay, Metro Manila, Philippines	
19	Win	9–2–8	Kid Manipis	PTS	10	10 Apr 1926	Manila, Metro Manila, Philippine	
18	Draw	8–2–8	Little Moro	PTS	12	27 Mar 1926	Olympic Stadium, Manila, Philippines	For vacant Orient flyweight title
17	Win	8–2–7	Varias Milling	PTS	12	30 Jan 1926	Olympic Stadium, Manila, Philippines	
16	Win	7–2–7	Kid Cobarrubias	PTS	12	9 Jan 1926	Manila, Metro Manila, Philippines	
15	Loss	6–2–7	Boy Walley	PTS	12	28 Nov 1925	Olympic Stadium, Manila, Philippines	
14	Win	6–1–7	Kid Moro	PTS	12	24 Oct 1925	Manila, Metro Manila, Philippines	
13	Draw	5–1–7	Frisco Concepcion	PTS	12	10 Oct 1925	Manila, Metro Manila, Philippines	
12	Draw	5–1–6	Little Moro	PTS	10	12 Sep 1925	Cebu City, Cebu, Philippines	
11	Win	5–1–5	Kid Gabo	PTS	10	25 Jul 1925	Manila, Metro Manila, Philippines	
10	Draw	4–1–5	Pio Rosario	PTS	6	18 Jul 1925	Olympic Stadium, Manila, Philippines	
9	Draw	4–1–4	Pio Rosario	PTS	12	6 Jun 1925	Manila, Metro Manila, Philippines	
8	Win	4–1–3	Bagani Tawidi	KO	5	16 May 1925	Manila, Metro, Manila, Philippines	
7	Loss	3–1–3	Fighting Gorio	PTS	4	2 May 1925	Wallace Field, Manila, Philippines	
6	Draw	3–0–3	Kid Manipis	PTS	6	28 Mar 1925	Manila, Metro Manila, Philippines	
5	Win	3–0–2	Pedro del Mundo	PTS	6	28 Feb 1925	Manila, Metro Manila Philippines	
4	Win	2–0–2	Emilio Flores	PTS	6	14 Feb 1925	Olympic Stadium, Manila, Philippines	
3	Win	1–0–2	Kid Castillo	PTS	4	24 Jan 1925	Manila, Metro Manila, Philippines	
2	Draw	0–0–2	Bagani Tawidi	PTS	4	27 Dec 1924	Manila, Metro Manila, Philippines	
1	Draw	0–0–1	Kid Castillo	PTS	4	29 Nov 1924	Olympic Stadium, Manila, Philippines	
