= Speedy Dado =

Filipino boxer (1906–1990)

- Dado in early career as flyweight

Personal information
- Born: Diosdado B. Posadas; December 25, 1906 Manila, Insular Government of the Philippine Islands
- Died: July 2, 1990 (aged 83) Manila, Luzon, Philippines
- Height: 5 ft 3 in (1.60 m)
- Weight: Bantamweight; Featherweight

Boxing career
- Stance: Orthodox

Boxing record
- Total fights: 147
- Wins: 90
- Win by KO: 37
- Losses: 43
- Draws: 14

Diosdado Posadas (December 25, 1906 – July 2, 1990), better known as Speedy Dado, was a Filipino boxer who contended for the world flyweight, bantamweight, and featherweight championships. His managers included Frank Churchill, and Jesus Cortez.

== Boxing career ==
Dado was born Diosdado B. Posadas in Manila on December 25, 1906. In an era when Asian boxers would often be referred to only by their nationality, he took the last two syllables of his birth name to use in the ring. In his career, he would be a top-rated contender for world titles in three separate weight divisions, and fight championship matches in each weight class.

=== World Fly title attempt, April, 1928 ===
He began his boxing career in 1926. Winning nearly all of his early bouts, he lost his first against Newsboy Brown on April 24, 1928, for the California version of the world flyweight title. Brown defeated him by technical knockout due to Dado's shoulder injury in the sixth round. The fighting was back and forth until the sixth, when Dado, taking a beating, suffered a dislocated shoulder. He met Brown twice more, winning one fight and losing the other.

On February 10, 1931, Dado defeated Newsboy Brown at the Olympic Auditorium in Los Angeles for the vacant USA California State bantamweight championship. Dado took six rounds with Brown only one, and the rest were even.

Reigning world bantamweight champion Panama Al Brown fell to Dado in a non-title ten-round decision on January 4, 1932, at Olympic Auditorium in Los Angeles. Showing great speed, Dado won convincingly, according to the Los Angeles Times, taking nine rounds to only the fourth for Brown. In the seventh, Dado unleashed a fury of punches that had Brown groggy. The San Francisco Examiner gave Dado only six rounds, but agreed Dado's win was decisive. Despite a six-inch disadvantage in height, and a significantly shorter reach, Dado had the speed to get close.

On November 15, 1932, Dado defeated Rodolfo Casanova in a well publicized main bout before 10,000 at the Olympic Auditorium in Los Angeles. Dado floored Casanova twice in the first round, once for counts of seven and five, but Casanova fought back and appeared to take the second. The Los Angeles Times gave four rounds to Dado, with the fourth, sixth and tenth to Casanova, with three even.

Dado fought for world titles on three other occasions, losing both of them. He lost a ten-round points decision in Los Angeles on January 25, 1933, to Baby Arizmendi for the California version of the world featherweight title. Arizmendi, in a clear victory, was credited with five rounds to only one for his Filipino challenger. Arizmendi handily took the fifth through seventh rounds. In their two previous bouts, each boxer had won once.

Dado defeated Baby Palmore on March 10, 1933, in a ten-round points decision in Hollywood. In a convincing victory, the Los Angeles Times wrote that Dado won all but the fourth round. The fifth started with Palmore clipping Dado with three strong rights to the chin that left him reeling, but Dado retaliated getting Palmore against the ropes, and continued to take the lead in the sixth through tenth. Earth tremors occurred during the bout. In a previous meeting at Hollywood Stadium with Palmore on February 10, 1933, Dado had been embarrassed by a first-round knockout from a short overhand right to the jaw, 1:15 into the first round.

=== Attempt at world feather title, March, 1933 ===
He lost on March 21, 1933, to Freddie Miller for the National Boxing Association featherweight title at the Olympic Stadium in Los Angeles. Miller won seven of the ten rounds, and had Dado on the floor for a six count from a strong right to the head in the second round. Dado took only rounds three and seven.

In a widely publicized bout on June 9, 1933, Dado drew with former Canadian bantamweight champion Pete Sanstol in a ten-round points decision at Dreamland in San Francisco. Both boxers boxed cautiously in the tame bout, though Sanstol appeared the aggressor. Several local papers wrote that Dado may have had a very slight edge in points.

On October 24, 1933, Dado defeated Young Tommy, a fellow Filipino, in a ten-round points decision at Olympic Auditorium in Los Angeles for the USA California State Bantamweight title. The crowd of 7,000 saw Dado use somewhat better defensive skills, and greater speed, though Tommy may have delivered the stronger blows at times. In a close bout, Dado took five rounds, Tommy four, and one was even. On May 19, 1933, Young Tommy won the state title against Dado in a ten-round points decision at Dreamland Auditorium in San Francisco. In a previous bout on October 12, 1932, Dado decisively defeated Young Tommy for the state bantamweight title in a ten-round points decision in Oakland. Dado took seven of the ten rounds, and showed great speed in the victory before a capacity crowd. Midway in the second, Tommy was down for a no-count from a left hook to the jaw. The final round was continuous action, and fought at great speed. Tommy would later defeat Dado in a ten-round non-title bout in Los Angeles on December 4, 1934.

==== Boxing in Australia, 1934 ====
Dado fought three high-profile bouts through the summer of 1934 in Australia. He lost to Merv Darky Blandon, Australian bantamweight champion, in a fifteen-round points decision on April 11, 1934, at Sydney Stadium. Blandon's right hand proved too much for Dado whose careful boxing was not enough to take the decision. On April 24, 1934, Dado lost again to Blandon in a close bout at Sydney Stadium before an impressive crowd of 12,000. Blandon took the offense more frequently and scored with straight lefts and right swings at many points in the match. Dado also scored with lefts to the body, with fierce attacks throughout the bout, but showed more caution when getting in close. A cut near Dato's right eye in the twelfth may have affected his boxing in the late rounds. On June 2, 1934, Dado could not continue boxing in the seventh round after tearing an ankle ligament after a collision with the referee, losing his bout with future Australian bantamweight champion Mickey Miller in Melbourne, Australia. Miller appeared to have a comfortable margin in points prior to the collision. Dado was rated in the top five among bantamweights in the world at the time.

Dado successfully defended his USA California State bantamweight title on September 28, 1934, in a close and furious ten round points decision against Joe Tei Ken in San Francisco. Two furious spurts in the ninth and tenth rounds finally sealed the decision in Dado's favor. The Reno Gazette gave Dado six rounds in the close bout with only three to Dado. With the slightest reach advantage, Dado seemed to have the upper hand at close quarters fighting. In a match one week earlier, Dado had been disqualified in the third round for dropping to the canvas, and then immediately dropping to one knee after arising. Dado had won in two previous matches between the two.

Dado defeated future bantamweight champion Lou Salica on October 19, 1934, in a ten-round points decision before a full house at Legion Stadium in Hollywood. Dado took the offense in most of the contest and fought with his characteristic speed, but seemed to coast after the first thirty seconds of several rounds, exhibiting reduced endurance from his earlier years. The San Francisco Examiner gave Dado six rounds, Salica three, and one even.

=== World bantam title attempt, May, 1935 ===
Before a significant crowd of 10,400, Dado lost a May 21, 1935 fight against Pablo Dano for the California and New York version of the bantamweight world title. Dano was particularly effective in delivering blows to the body and stomach of his opponent, and took the offensive in the fighting from the early rounds. He scored a no-count knockdown in the second round. Dano was given recognition by the National Boxing Assocication if he would box Pablo Escobar, so the same recognition may have been given to Dado had he won, granting him his only widely recognized world title. The loss relegated Dado to secondary status as a boxer. At 28, with fifteen years of boxing behind him, Dado had taken too much pounding to stay a top rated competitor.

Although he never won a world title, he defeated two champions and drew with reigning world flyweight champion Midget Wolgast. Dado lost to Wolgast in two other meetings.

== Professional boxing record ==
164 fights	103 wins	43 losses
By knockout	39	12
By decision	60	30
By disqualification	4	1
Draws	18	

No.	Result	Record	Opponent	Type	Round, Time	Date	Location	Note
164	Loss	103–43–18	(Mexico) Juan Zurita	TKO	5 (10)	1940-07-21	Arena Progreso, Guadalajara, Mexico	
163	Loss	103–42–18	(Mexico) Panchito Villa	KO	4 (10)	1940-06-26	Monterrey, Nuevo León, Mexico	
162	Win	103–41–18	(Mexico) Monterrey Kid Pancho	KO	4 (10)	1940-06-12	Monterrey, Nuevo León, Mexico	
161	Loss	102–41–18	(United States) Joey August	KO	1 (10), 1:50	1938-09-30	(United States) Al Morse Coliseum, Spokane, U.S.	
160	Loss	102–40–18	(United States) Jimmy (Babe) McCusker	KO	1 (6)	1937-12-14	(United States) Crystal Pool, Seattle, U.S.	
159	Lose	102–39–18	(Canada) Billy Buxton	KO	2 (10), 2:02	1937-11-30	(United States) Crystal Pool, Seattle, U.S.	
158	Loss	102–38–18	(United States) Jackie Wilson	PTS	10	1937-07-05	(United States) Stockton, California, U.S.	
157	Win	102–37–18	(United States) Barney Duran	PTS	10	1937-06-08	(United States) Memorial Civic Auditorium, Stockton, California, U.S.	
156	Win	101–37–18	(United States) Tony Souza	PTS	10	1937-05-25	(United States) Memorial Civic Auditorium, Stockton, California, U.S.	
155	Draw	100–37–18	(United States) Tony Souza	PTS	10	1937-05-18	(United States) Memorial Civic Auditorium, Stockton, California, U.S.	
154	Loss	100–37–17	(United States) Horace Mann	PTS	10	1937-04-30	(United States) Civic Auditorium, San Jose, California, U.S.	
153	Loss	100–36–17	(Canada) Billy Buxton	UD	8	1937-03-30	(United States) Civic Ice Arena, Seattle, U.S.	
152	Loss	100–35–17	(United States) Horace Mann	PTS	10	1937-03-16	(United States) Memorial Civic Auditorium, Stockton, California, U.S.	
151	Loss	100–34–17	(United States) Toby Vigil	PTS	8	1937-03-09	(United States) Olympic Auditorium, Los Angeles, U.S.	
150	Loss	100–33–17	(United States) Bobby Leyvas	TKO	6 (10), 1:40	1936-04-17	(United States) Legion Stadium, Hollywood, U.S.	
149	Loss	100–32–18	(United States) Al Spina	PTS	10	1935-12-17	(United States) Auditorium, Portland, U.S.	
148	Loss	100–31–17	(United States) Al Spina	PTS	10	1935-12-10	(United States) Auditorium, Portland, U.S.	
147	Loss	100–30–17	(United States) Tuffy Pierpont	PTS	8	1935-11-12	(United States) Auditorium, Oakland, U.S.	
146	Draw	100–29–17	(United States) Tony Marino	PTS	10	1935-10-22	(United States) Memorial Auditorium, Sacramento, U.S.	
145	Win	100–29–16	(United States) Baby Palmore	PTS	10	1935-10-15	(United States) Memorial Civic Auditorium, Stockton, California, U.S.	
144	Draw	99–29–16	(United States) Frankie Castillo	PTS	10	a1935-09-27	(United States) Legion Stadium, Hollywood, U.S.	
143	Loss	99–29–15	(United States) Frankie Castillo	PTS	10	1935-09-17	(United States) Olympic Auditorium, Los Angeles, U.S.	
142	Loss	99–28–15	(Philippines) Small Montana	PTS	10	1935-08-31	(United States) Memorial Civic Auditorium, Stockton, California, U.S.	
141	Loss	99–27–15	(United States) Bobby Leyvas	PTS	10	1935-08-02	(United States) Legion Stadium, Hollywood, U.S.	
140	Loss	99–26–15	(Mexico) Rodolfo Casanova	UD	10	1935-07-16	(United States) Olympic Auditorium, Los Angeles, U.S.	
139	Win	99–25–15	(United States) Bobby Olivas	PTS	10	1935-07-05	(United States) Stockton, California U.S.	
138	Loss	98–25–15	(Philippines) Pablo Dano	PTS	10	1935-05-21	Olympic Auditorium, Los Angeles, United States of America	For World bantamweight title
137	Draw	98–24–15	(Philippines) Pablo Dano	PTS	10	1935-04-30	(United States) Olympic Auditorium, Los Angeles, U.S.	
136	Win	98–24–14	(Korea) Joe Tei Ken	PTS	10	1935-04-11	(United States) Memorial Auditorium, Sacramento, U.S.	
135	Win	97–24–14	(Republic of Ireland) Mickey Beal	PTS	10	1935-02-01	(United States) Legion Stadium, Hollywood, U.S.	
134	Win	96–24–14	(United States) Joey Dodge	PTS	10	1934-12-21	(United States) L Street Arena, Sacramento, U.S.	
133	Loss	95–24–14	(Philippines) Young Tommy	PTS	10	1934-12-04	(United States) Olympic Auditorium, Los Angeles, U.S.	
132	Win	95–23–14	(United States) Augie Ruggiere	PTS	10	1934-11-08	(United States) L Street Arena, Sacramento, U.S.	
131	Win	94–23–14	(United States) Louis Salica	PTS	10	1934-10-19	(United States) Legion Stadium, Hollywood, U.S.	
130	Win	93–23–14	Joe Tei Ken (Korea)	PTS	10	1934-09-28	(United States) Dreamland Auditorium, San Francisco, U.S.	Won CSAC bantamweight title
129	Loss	92–23–14	(Korea) Joe Tei Ken	DQ	3 (10)	1934-09-21	(United States) Dreamland Auditorium, San Francisco, U.S.	After being knocked down, Dado got up and then dropped down again onto one knee, as a result, the referee disqualified Dado
128	Win	92–22–14	(United States) Bobby Olivas	PTS	10	1934-08-31	(United States) Dreamland Auditorium, San Francisco, U.S.	
127	Win	91–22–14	(Mexico) Pete Saavedra	KO	4 (10)	1934-08-24	(United States) Watsonville, California, U.S.	
126	Win	90–22–14	(United States) Bobby Olivas	PTS	10	1934-08-03	(United States) Pismo Beach Arena, Pismo Beach, U.S.	
125	Loss	89–22–14	(Australia) Mickey Miller	RTD	7 (15x2)	1934-06-02	West Melbourne Stadium, Melbourne, Australia	
124	Loss	89–21–14	(Australia) Merv Darky Blandon	PTS	15x2	1934-04-23	Sydney Stadium, Sydney, Australia	
123	Los	89–20–14	(Australia) Merv Darky Blandon	PTS	15x2	1934-03-12	Sydney Stadium, Sydney, Australia	
122	Loss	89–19–14	(United States) Lew Farber	PTS	10	1933-12-22	(United States) Legion Stadium, Hollywood, UMS.	
121	Loss	89–18–14	(Mexico) Rodolfo Casanova	PTS	10	1933-12-05	Olympic Auditorium, Los Angeles, United States of America	
120	Win	89–17–14	(Philippines) Young Tommy	10	PTS	1933-10-24	Olympic Auidtorium, Los Angeles, United States of America	Won CSAC bantamweight title
119	Win	88–17–14	(United States) Billy McLeod	10	PTS	1933-10-16	(United States) Legion Stadium, Hollywood, U.S.	
118	Win	87–17–14	(United States) Augie Curtis	PTS	10	1933-08-18	(United States) Civic Auditorium, Honolulu, U.S.	
117	Win	86–17–14	(United States) Sailor Ray Butler	KO	4 (10)	1933-08-13	(United States) Volcano Arena, Hilo, U.S.	
116	Win	85–17–14	(United States) Johnny Yasui	PTS	10	1933-08-04	(United States) Civic Auditorium, Honolulu, U.S.	
115	Win	84–17–14	(Korea) Joe Tei Ken	PTS	10	1933-07-14	(United States) Legion Stadium, Hollywood, U.S.	
114	Draw	83–17–14	(Norway) Pete Sanstol	PTS	10	1933-06-09	(United States) Dreamland Auditorium, San Francisco, U.S.	
113	Loss	83–17–13	(Philippines) Young Tommy	PTS	10	1933-05-19	Dreamland Auditorium, San Francisco, United States of America	Lost CSAC California bantamweight title
112	Win	83–16–13	(Korea) Joe Tei Ken	PTS	10	1933-05-05	(United States) Legion Stadium, Hollywood, U.S.	Won CSAC bantamweight title
111	Win	82–16–13	(United States) Joe Sanchez	PTS	6	1933-04-21	(United States) Ventura A.C., Ventura, California, U.S.	
110	Win	81–16–13	(United States) Ernie Good	TKO	5 (10)	1933-04-05	(United States) Wilmington Bowl, Wilmington, Los Angeles, U.S.	Hood's corner threw in the towel at the fifth round
109	Loss	80–16–13	(United States) Freddie Miller	PTS	10	1933-03-21	(United States) Olympic Stadium, Los Angeles, U.S.	For NBA featherweight title
108	Win	80–15–13	(United States) Baby Palmore	PTS	10	1933-03-10	(United States) Legion Stadium, Hollywood, U.S.	
107	Win	79–15–13	(United States) Ernie Hood	TKO	3 (10), 1:05	1933-02-24	(United States) Coliseum, San Diego, U.S.	
106	Loss	78–15–13	(United States) Baby Palmore	KO	1 (10)	1933-02-10	(United States) Legion Stadium, Hollywood, U.S.	
105	Loss	78–14–13	(Mexico) Baby Arizmendi	PTS	10	1933-01-24	Olympic Auditorium, Los Angeles, United States of America	For California World featherweight title
104	Win	78–13–13	(France) Eugène Huat	PTS	10	1932-12-20	(United States) Olympic Auditorium, Los Angeles, U.S.	
103	Win	77–13–13	(United States) Hill Hernandez	KO	1 (10), 2:58	1932-12-06	(United States) Ryan's Auditorium, Fresno, U.S.	
102	Win	76–13–13	(Mexico) Rodolfo Casanova	PTS	10	1932-11-15	(United States) Olympic Auditorium, Los Angeles, U.S.	
101	Loss	75–13–13	(Mexico) Rodolfo Casanova	KO	4 (10)	1932-10-23	El Toreo de Cuarto Caminos, Mexico City, Mexico	
100	Win	75–12–13	(Philippines) Young Tommy	PTS	10	1932-10-12	(United States) Auditorium, Oakland, U.S.	Won CSAC bantamweight title
99	Draw	74–12–13	(United States) Midget Wolgast	PTS	10	1932-09-31	(United States) Auditorium, Oakland, U.S.	
98	Win	74–12–12	(Mexico) Pedro Villanueva	PTS	4	1932-08-30	(United States) Olympic Auditorium, Los Angeles, U.S.	
97	Loss	73–12–12	(United States) Peppy Sanchez	PTS	10	1932-08-17	(United States) Ryan's Auditorium, Fresno, U.S.	
96	Win	73–11–12	(Argentina) Rodolfo Teglia	PTS	6	1932-08-12	(United States) Multnomah Stadium, Portland, U.S.	
95	Win	72–11–12	(United States) Canto Robleto	PTS	8	1932-08-03	(United States) Civic Ice Arena, Seattle, U.S.	
94	Draw	71–11–12	(United States) Canto Robleto	PTS	6	1932-07-27	(United States) Civic Ice Arena, Seattle, U.S.	
93	Win	71–11–11	(United States) Hill Hernandez	KO	3 (10), 2:33	1932-07-12	(United States) Olympic Auditorium, Los Angeles, U.S.	
92	Win	70–11–11	(United States) Vernon Jackson	TKO	6 (10)	1932-07-02	Pismo Beach Arena, Pismo Beach, U.S.	
91	Win	69–11–11	(United States) Abie Israel	UD	6	1932-03-30	(United States) Civic Ice Arena, Seattle, U.S.	
90	Win	68–11–11	(Mexico) Baby Arizmendi	PTS	10	1932-03-18	(United States) Stockton, California, U.S.	
89	Win	67–11–11	(Argentina) Rodolfo Teglia	RTD	7 (10)	1932-03-08	(United States) Olympic Auditorium, Los Angeles, U.S.	
88	Win	66–11–11	(United States) Gene Jens	KO	1 (10)	1932-02-18	(United States) Bakersfield Arena, Bakersfield, California, U.S.	
87	Loss	65–11–11	(Mexico) Baby Arizmendi	PTS	10	1932-02-09	(United States) Olympic Auditorium, Los Angeles, U.S.	
86	Win	65–10–11	Panama Al Brown	UD	10	1932-01-05	(United States) Olympic Auditorium, Los Angeles, U.S.	
85	Loss	64–10–11	(United States) Midget Wolgast	PTS	10	1931-12-02	(United States) Auditorium, Oakland, U.S.	
84	Win	64–9–11	(United States) Benny Schwartz	PTS	10	1931-11-20	(United States) Legion Stadium, Hollywood, U.S.	
83	Loss	63–9–11	(United States) Canto Robleto	PTS	10	1931-11-06	(United States) Dreamland Auditorium, San Francisco, U.S.	
82	Win	63–8–11	(United States) George Burns	KO	1 (10)	1931-10-16	(United States) Civic Auditorium, Watsonville, U.S.	
81	Loss	62–8–11	(United States) Midget Wolgast	PTS	10	1931-10-07	(United States) Auditorium, Oakland, U.S.	
80	Win	62–7–11	(United States) Xavier Navi	TKO	3 (10)	1931-09-18	(United States) Stockton, California, U.S.	
79	Win	61–7–11	(United States) Abie Israel	KO	1 (10)	1931-09-02	(United States) Auditorium, Oakland, U.S.	
78	Win	60–7–11	(United States) Salvadore Luvano	KO	2 (10)	1931-08-07	(United States) Civic Auditorium, Watsonville, U.S.	
77	Win	59–7–11	(United States) Delos 'Kid' Willsms	KO	2 (10)	1931-07-32	(United States) Stockton, California, U.S.	
76	Win	58–7–11	(United States) Leonard Rahming	TKO	4 (10)	1931-07-03	(United States) Stockton, California, U.S.	
75	Win	57–7–11	(United States) Young Sport	PTS	10	1931-06-23	(United States) Memorial Auditorium, Sacramento, U.S.	
74	Win	56–7–11	(United States) Ray Montoya	KO	2 (10), 1:25	1931-06-12	(United States) Legion Stadium, Hollywood, U.S.	
73	Win	55–7–11	(United States) Judy Zuniga	PTS	10	1931-04-28	(United States) Olympic Auditorium, Los Angeles, U.S.	
72	Win	54–7–11	(United States) Salvadore Luvano	KO	1 (4)	1931-04-10	(United States) Dreamland Auditorium, San Francisco, U.S.	
71	Losa	53–7–11	(United States) Judy Zuniga	PTS	6	1931-04-07	(United States) Olympic Auditorium, Los Angeles, U.S.	
70	Win	53–6–11	(Mexico) Chato Alredo	PTS	10	1931-03-27	(United States) Legion Stadium, Hollywood, U.S.	
69	Loss	52–6–11	(United States) Newsboy Brown	KO	3 (10)	1931-03-03	(United States) Olympic Auditorium, Los Angeles, U.S.	Lost CSAC bantamweight title
68	Win	52–5–11	(United States) Newsboy Brown	PTS	10	1931-02-10	(United States) Olympic Audtorium, Los Angeles, U.S.	Won vacant CSAC bantamweight title
67	Win	51–5–11	(United States) Jackie Evans	KO	2 (10)	1931-01-19	(United States) Auditorium, Oakland, U.S.	
66	Win	50–5–11	(United States) Kid Martinez	KO	2 (4)	1930-12-19	Dreamland Auditorium, San Francisco, U.S.	
65	Win	49–5–11	(United States) Robert Rodriguez	KO	1 (10)	1930-11-28	(United States) Imperial Valley A.C., El Centro, U.S.	
64	Win	48–5–11	(United States) Johnny Godinez	KO	3 (10)	1930-11-14	(United States) Imperial Valley A.C., El Centro, U.S.	
63	Draw	47–5–11	(United States) Canto Robleto	PTS	10	1930-10-31	(United States) Legion Stadium, Hollywood, U.S.	
62	Loss	47–5–10	(United States) Midget Wolgast	RTD	5 (10)	1930-07-29	(United States) Olympic Auditorium, Los Angeles, U.S.	
61	Loss	47–4–10	(Mexico) Chato Laredo	PTS	10	1930-07-11	(United States) Legion Stadium, Hollywood, U.S.	
60	Win	47–3–10	(Mexico) Chato Laredo	PTS	10	1930-06-24	(United States) Olympic Auditorium, Los Angeles, U.S.	
59	Draw	46–3–10	(United States) Canto Robleto	PTS	10	1930-06-12	(United States) Pasadena Arena, Pasadena, U.S.	
58	Win	46–3–9	(United States) Young Sport	PTS	10	1930-05-23	(United States) Legion Stadium, Hollywood, U.S.	
57	Win	45–3–9	(United States) Young Sport	PTS	10	1930-03-13	(United States) Pasadena Arena, Pasadena, U.S.	
56	Win	44–3–9	(United States) Sailor Jimmy Lucas	TKO	5 (10)	1930-01-10	(United States) Imperial Valley A.C., El Centro, U.S.	
55	Win	43–3–9	(United States) Billy Cain	KO	3 (10)	1930-01-03	(United States) Imperial Valley A.C., El Centro, U.S.	
54	Win	42–3–9	(United States) Bobby Garcia	KO	3 (10)	1929-12-30	(United States) National Hall, San Francisco, U.S.	
53	Win	41–3–9	(United States) Tommy Hughes	PTS	10	1929-10-18	(United States) Coliseum, San Diego, U.S.	
52	Win	40–3–9	(United States) Charley Kaiser	PTS	10	1929-10-11	(United States) Legion Stadium, Hollywood, U.S.	
51	Win	39–3–9	(United States) Ernie Peters	PTS	10	1929-09-10	(United States) Olympic Auditorium, Los Angeles, U.S.	
50	Win	38–3–9	(Singapore) Boy Walley	PTS	10	1929-09-02	(United States) State Armory, San Francisco, U.S.	
49	Win	37–3–9	(United States) Tommy Hughes	PTS	10	1929-08-16	(United States) Legion Stadium, San Francisco, U.S.	
48	Win	36–3–9	(Mexico) Chato Laredo	PTS	10	1929-07-31	(United States) National Hall, San Francisco, U.S.	
47	Win	35–3–9	(United States) Harold Matthews	RTD	6 (10)	1929-07-19	(United States) Legion Stadium, Hollywood, U.S.	
46	Win	34–3–9	(United States) Delos 'Kid' Williams	PTS	10	1929-06-18	(United States) Olympic Auditorium, Los Angeles, U.S.	
45	Win	33–3–9	(United States) Jimmy Lucas	TKO	4 (10)	1929-06-04	(United States) Olympic Auditorium, Los Angeles, U.S.	
44	Draw	32–3–9	(United States) Ernie Peters	PTS	10	1929-02-19	(United States) Olympic Auditorium, Los Angeles, U.S.	
43	Win	32–3–8	(United States) Ernie Hood	TKO	1 (10), 2:50	1929-01-25	(United States) Legion Stadium, Hollywood, U.S.	
42	Draw	31–3–8	(United States) Clayton Gouyd	PTS	6	1929-01-11	(United States) Legion Stadium, Hollywood, U.S.	
41	Win	31–3–7	(United States) Bobby Garcia	KO	1 (?)	1929-01-01	(United States) Pismo Beach, California, U.S.	
40	Win	30–3–7	(United States) Louie Contreras	TKO	4 (6)	1928-09-18	(United States) Olympic Auditorium, Los Angeles, U.S.	Seconds for Contreras threw in the white flag
39	Win	29–3–7	(United States) Johnny Godinez	TKO	5 (10)	1928-09-05	(United States) National Hall, San Francisco, U.S.	
38	Win	28–3–7	(United States) Pinkie George	TKO	2 (10)	1928-08-29	(United States) National Hall, San Francisco, U.S.	
37	Loss	27–3–7	(United States) Newsboy Brown	TKO	6 (10)	1928-04-24	(United States) Olympic Auditorium, Los Angeles, U.S.	For vacant World flyweight title;Dado forced to pull out after six rounds due to a shoulder Injury
36	Win	27–2–7	(United States) Louie Contreras	PTS	6	1928-03-06	(United States) Olympic Auditorium, Los Angeles, U.S.	
35	Win	26–2–7	(United States) Delos 'Kid' Williams	PTS	10	1928-02-13	(United States) State Armory, San Francisco, U.S.	
34	Draw	25–2–7	(United States) Delos 'Kid' Williams	PTS	10	1928-01-02	(United States) Recreation Park, San Francisco, U.S.	
33	Draw	25–2–6	(United States) Frankie Murray	PTS	10	1927-12-16	(United States) L Street Arena, Sacramento, U.S.	
32	Win	25–2–5	(United States) Snowy Johnson	TKO	3 (10)	1927-11-02	(United States) National Hall, San Francisco, U.S.	
31	Win	24–2–5	(United States) Benny Marks	PTS	10	1927-10-25	(United States) Recreation Park, San Francisco, U.S.	
30	Win	23–2–5	(United States) Frankie Murray	PTS	10	1927-10-05	(United States) Auditorium, Oakland, U.S.	
29	Win	22–2–5	(United States) Frankie Novey	PTS	10	1927-09-28	(United States) National Hall, San Francisco, U.S.	
28	Win	21–2–5	(Chile) Carlos Navia	KO	2 (10)	1927-09-15	(United States) National Hall, San Francisco, U.S.	
27	Win	20–2–5	(United States) Kid Riley	TKO	8 (10)	1927-08-31	(United States) National Hall, San Francisco, U.S.	The towel was tossed into the ring after Riley slipped and injured his ankle
26	Win	19–2–5	(Mexico) Gonzalo Rubio	KO	7 (10)	1927-08-10	(United States) National Hall, San Francisco, U.S.	
25	Draw	18–2–5	(United States) Frankie Murray	PTS	10	1927-07-27	(United States) National Hall, San Francisco, U.S.	
24	Win	18–2–4	(United States) Frankie Novey	PTS	10	1927-07-13	(United States) National Hall, San Francisco, U.S.	
23	Win	17–2–4	(United States) Paddy Wheeler	KO	5 (6)	1927-06-28	(United States) Dugdale Park, Seattle, U.S.	
22	Win	16–2–4	(Philippines) Little Moro	PTS	10	1927-04-09	Manila, Metro Manila, Philippines	
21	Win	15–2–4	(Philippines) George Montanez	PTS	12	1927-03-25	Manila, Metro Manila, Philippines	
20	Win	14–2–4	(Singapore) Boy Walley	PTS	12	1927-01-31	Olympic Stadium, Manila, Philippines	
19	Win	13–2–4	(Philippines) Pablo Dano	PTS	10	1927-01-01	Manila, Metro Manila, Philippines	
18	Draw	12–2–4	(Philippines) Pablo Dano	PTS	12	1926-12-11	Manila, Metro Manila, Philippines	
17	Lose	12–2–3	(Philippines) George Montanez	PTS	8	1926-11-27	Manila, Metro Manila, Philippines	
16	Win	12–1–3	(Philippines) Kid Manipis	PTS	8	1926-10-02	Manila, Metro Manila, Philippines	
15	Win	11–1–3	(Philippines) Kid Avelino	PTS	10	1926-08-20	Happy World Arena, Singapore	Won vacant Malaya bantamweight title
14	Win	10–1–3	(Philippines) Al Trono	DQ	6 (10)	1926-07-02	Happy Valley Arena, Singapore	Trono disqualified for a low blow
13	Win	9–1–3	(Singapore) Y C Song	DQ	8 (10)	1926-06-12	Happy Valley Arena, Singapore	Song disqualified when his trainer went into the ring to rub his body with a towel during a timeout to tighten Dado's gloves
12	Win	8–1–3	(Philippines) Frank De Vera	DQ	4 (8) ?	1926-05-01	Happy Valley Arena, Singapore	De Vera disqualified for repeated low blows
11	Win	7–1–3	(Philippines) Joe Sisson	PTS	6	1926-03-20	Olympic Stadium, Manila, Philippines	
10	Win	6–1–3	(Philippines) Eusebio Flores	DQ	6 (?)	1926-02-27	Olympic Stadium, Manila, Philippines	
9	Win	5–1–3	(Philippines) Joe Sisson	PTS	6	1926-01-30	Olympic Stadium, Manila, Philippines	
8	Draw	4–1–3	(Philippines) Young Dumaguilas	PTS	4	1926-01-09	Manila, Metro Manila, Philippines	
7	Win	4–1–2	(Philippines) Joe Sisson	PTS	4	1925-12-19	Manila, Metro Manila, Philippines	
6	Win	3–1–2	(Philippines) Speed Andres	PTS	6	1925-11-21	Olympic Stadium, Manila, Philippines	
5	Draw	2–1–2	(Philippines) Joe Mendiola	PTS	4	1925-10-17	Olympic Stadium, Manila, Philippines	
4	Loss	2–1–1	(Philippines) Young Pancho	PTS	4	1925-02-21	Olympic Stadium, Manila, Philippines	
3	Draw	2–0–1	(Philippines) Kid Manila	PTS	4	1924-12-13	Olympic Stadium, Manila, Philippines	
2	Win	2–0	(United States) Little Dundee	PTS	4	1924-11-22	Olympic Stadium, Manila, Philippines	
1	Win	1–0	(Philippines) Young Sacramento	KO	2 (?)	1924-10-25	Olympic Stadium, Manila, Philippines	Professional Debut

== Retirement ==
Dado retired from boxing in 1940 after a fifth-round technical knockout loss to Juan Zurita on July 21 in Guadalajara, Mexico. Zurita would meet several of America's top boxers in his later career and hold the world lightweight title in 1944, after taking it from Sammy Angott.

== Life after boxing ==
After retiring from boxing, Dado had surgery to remove one of his eyes in 1941, likely a result of injuries sustained from his boxing career.

He worked for a period as a chauffeur for actress Mae West in Los Angeles, as had several other high-profile boxers.

According to a widely distributed UP press report of February 23, 1943, Dado was shot and wounded at a Los Angeles area cafe, following an altercation with 36-year old special policeman Clyde Vickers. Dado had confronted Vickers about why he was carrying a gun, and was shot while attempting to take the .45 caliber firearm from him. Dado's initial condition was listed as "critical" and emergency surgery was required to remove the bullet from his abdomen. Dado faced several arrests for drinking in his later years in Los Angeles.

In 1946, he worked for a time selling boxing programs at fights and continued to sell boxing magazines for a meager salary at the Olympic Auditorium in Los Angeles through at least 1960.

He died on July 2, 1990, in Manila, Philippines at the age of 83.
