= Young Tommy =

Filipino boxer

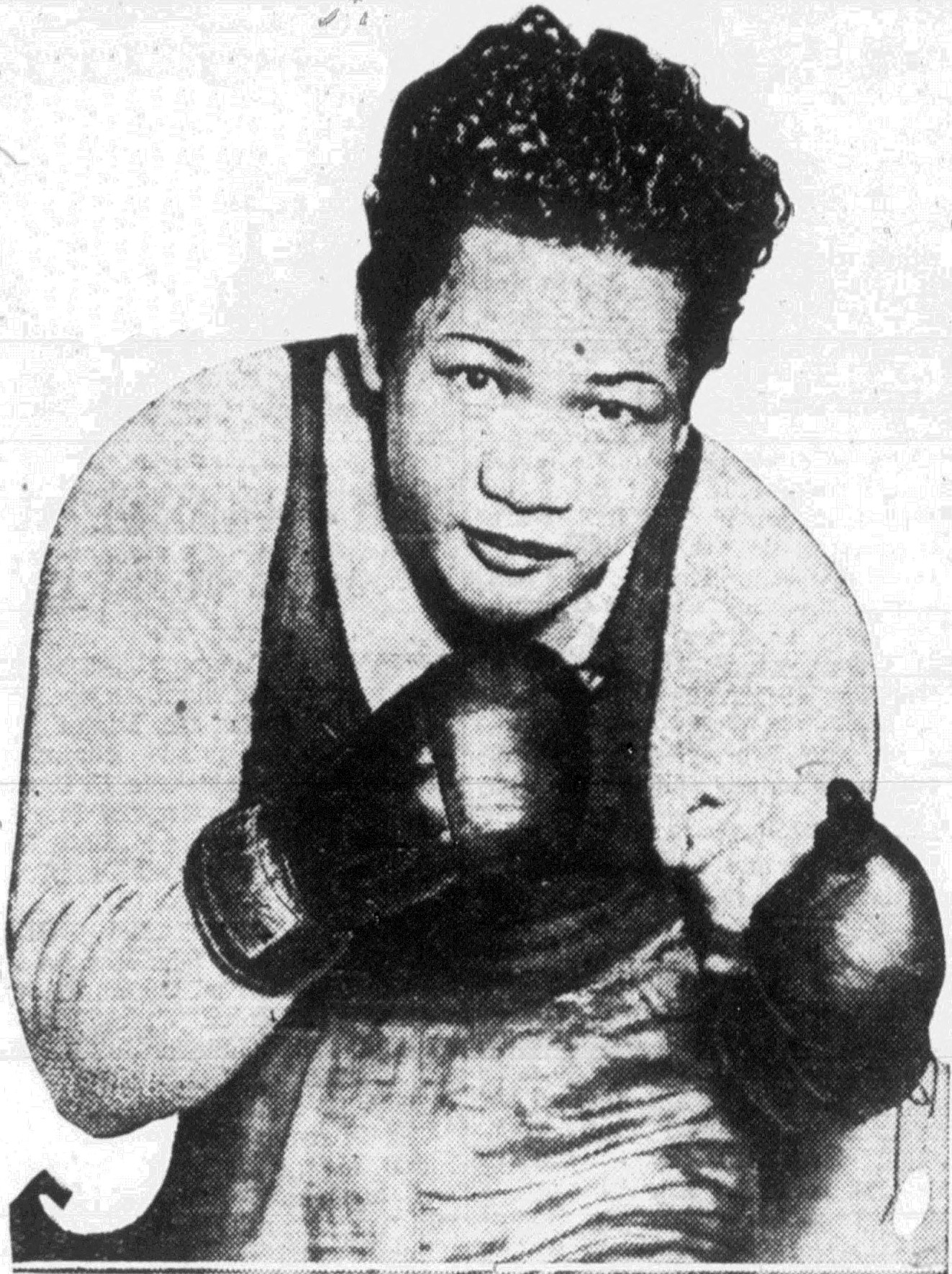
- Young Tommy, circa 1933

Personal information
- Nationality: Filipino
- Born: Fernando Opao; December 25, 1910 Silay, Philippine Islands
- Height: 5 ft 3 in (1.60 m)
- Weight: Bantamweight

Boxing career
- Stance: Orthodox

Boxing record
- Total fights: 86
- Wins: 61
- Win by KO: 24
- Losses: 16
- Draws: 9

Fernando Opao (born December 25, 1910, date of death unknown), better known as Young Tommy, was a bantamweight boxer from the Philippines who went undefeated on his first 18 fights. His first loss came in 1931 against Newsboy Brown for the California State bantamweight title. He was born in Silay, Philippines.

Young Tommy lost against Speedy Dado in a match for the California State bantamweight title in 1933. In a 1934 rematch with Dado, Young Tommy beat him. Young Tommy fought for the bantamweight world title in 1935, losing to Pablo Dano. In his 86 fights, he won 61 (24 by knockout), lost 16, and drew 9.
