= Stockton Memorial Civic Auditorium =

Performance venue in Stockton, California, U.S.

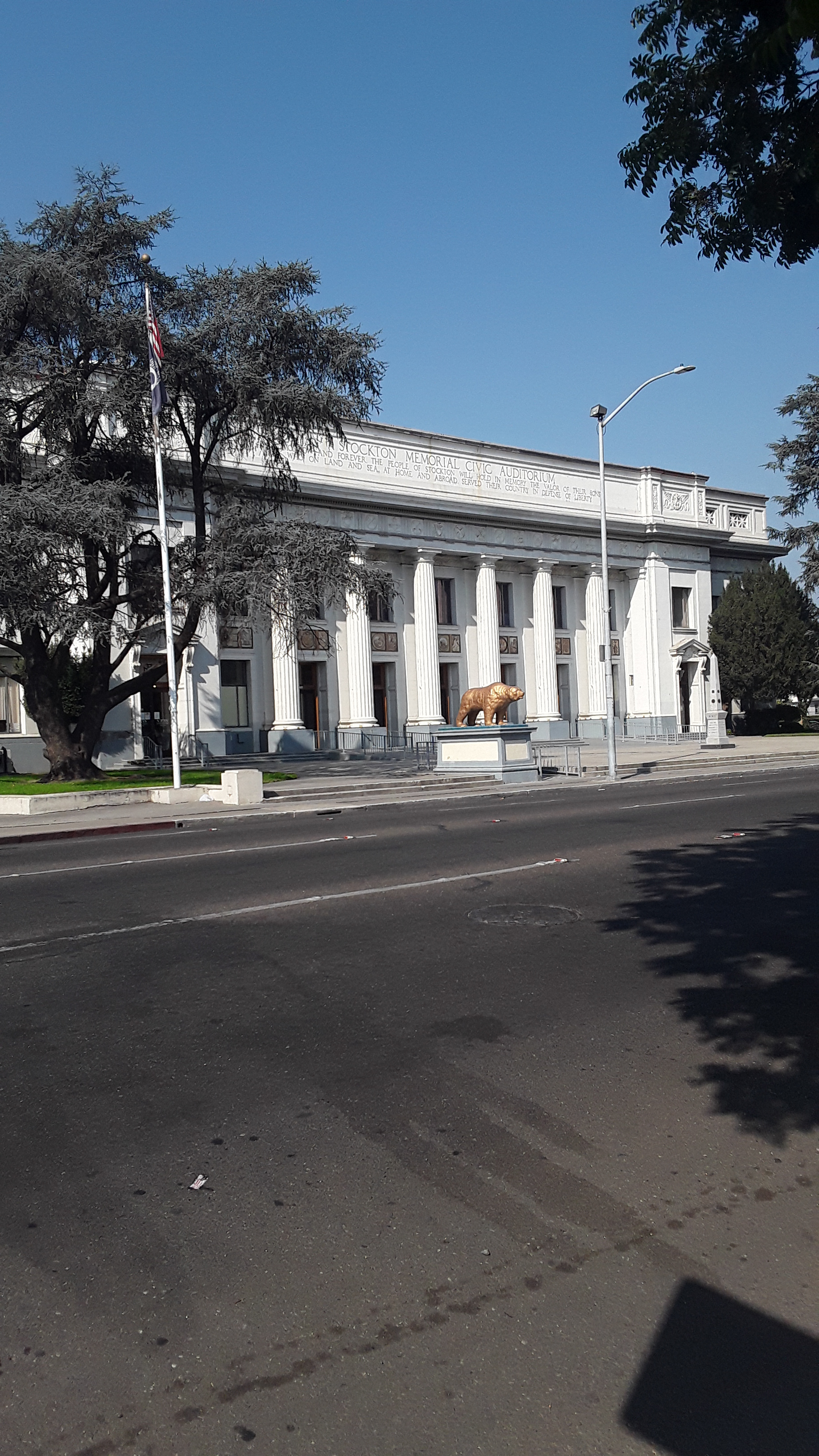
- Image taken in 2020
- Interactive map of Stockton Memorial Civic Auditorium
- Location: Stockton, California
- Coordinates: 37°57′28″N 121°17′36″W
- Capacity: 200 - 2,800

Construction
- Built: 1924 - 1925
- Opened: November 4, 1925
- Cost: $482,338

The Stockton Memorial Civic Auditorium is a performance venue in Stockton, California. Construction began in 1924 and the auditorium opened in November 1925, it seats about 5,000 people. Local architects Glenn Allen and Wright & Satterlee were awarded construction, while Stocktonians conducted bond drives to fund construction of the Memorial Auditorium to honor those who gave their lives while serving in the Armed Forces in World War I.

== History ==
In October 1920, a bond election was held in order to obtain funds to invest in a site and construct of the Memorial Civic Auditorium. People had asked for the Auditorium to be built in order to honor of the Americans who served in World War I. Other reasons for the Auditorium included the necessity for a facility to provide community events.

On July 23, 1924, a contract was accepted by the city of Stockton to build a Memorial Civic Auditorium. A total of $482,338 was used to fund the development of the building. Construction of the foundation and first floor began in either late 1924 or early 1925. The building was completed on November 4, 1925, and dedicated on Veterans Day later that year.

== Architecture ==
The stage is underneath a proscenium style arch. The outside walls of the building are brick with cement plaster finish in imitation of Indiana limestone. The interior walls are brick, reinforced concrete or metal lath and plaster. The structural parts of the roof and balcony are reinforced concrete. The arena's hardwood floors are white maple over concrete sub-floor, and the roof is of "Armso" iron over felt.

=== Inscriptions ===
There is a phrase carved atop of the building which reads "Tomorrow and Forever the People of Stockton Will Hold in Memory the Valor of Their Sons Who On Land and Sea, at Home and Abroad, Served Their Country in Defense of Liberty" as a reference to the World War I veterans, along with those killed in action. Other inscriptions at the top of the exterior walls contain "To the men of Stockton, California who gave their lives in World War I."

== Events ==
The Auditorium hosted the Big West Conference men's basketball tournament in 1976 and was home of the University Pacific Tigers men's basketball until 1982, the year the Alex G. Spanos Center opened. (The Spanos Center has since been succeeded by Stockton Arena as Stockton's premiere indoor venue) The facility has hosted numerous concerts over the years including Carlos Santana, Rush, and Blue Oyster Cult. The Golliwogs played at the auditorium in 1966 and The Grateful Dead played 1/18/78 at the auditorium on their well-regarded west coast winter tour.
