= Jimmy Goodrich =

American boxer (1900-1982)

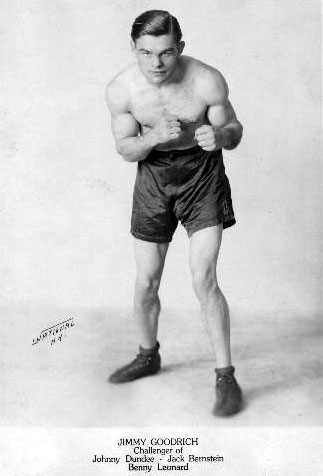

Personal information
- Nationality: American
- Born: James Edward Moran; July 30, 1900 Scranton, Pennsylvania
- Died: September 25, 1982 (aged 82) Fort Myers, Florida
- Height: 5 ft 6 in (1.68 m)
- Weight: Lightweight

Boxing career
- Reach: 65.5 in (166 cm)
- Stance: Orthodox

Boxing record
- Total fights: 195
- Wins: 118
- Losses: 52
- Draws: 25

Jimmy Goodrich became the Undisputed World Lightweight Champion when he defeated Chilean boxer Stanislaus Loayza in a second round TKO at Queensboro Stadium in Queens, New York on July 13, 1925. He retained the title only five months, losing it by unanimous decision to Rocky Kansas on December 7, 1925. Goodrich was known for having never been the victim of a knockout.

== Early life ==
Goodrich was born on July 30, 1900, in Scranton, Pennsylvania, the son of Irish Catholic parents. His father was a coal miner. Like many boxers of his era, in his youth he sold newspapers to make extra money. In his teens his family moved to Buffalo, and both he and his father became steel workers. He once wrote that some of his earliest bouts were exhibitions he gave at the factories where he worked.

When his father died, and his mother remarried, he used his stepfather's surname Goodrich as his ring name and subsequently kept it throughout his life. He married his wife Patti around 1920 and remained married until he died.

== Early boxing career ==
Goodrich began a professional career in boxing by 1918, winning a string of his early fights, mostly short bouts in the Buffalo area. One of his few early losses was to Johnny McCoy, on May 6, 1919. McCoy would become World Flyweight Champion in October 1927. Some of the better boxers Goodrich met in his early career included Benny Valgar, Johnny Dundee, Frankie Callahan, and Louis "Kid" Kaplan. Of these, he beat only Frankie Callahan on April 2, 1923, in Buffalo. Significantly, in his first match with Johnny Dundee on April 4, 1922, in the Civic Arena in Toronto, he lost in a ten round split decision. The fight was intended to have been a Jr. Lightweight World Championship except that Goodrich was one pound overweight, disqualifying him from Jr. Lightweight status. The fight was close, and could be considered Goodrich's first bout as a contender.

== Mid boxing career and rise to lightweight championship ==
Goodrich defeated accomplished boxer Pal Moran on September 4, 1923, in Queensboro Stadium in a ten round points decision. He drew with Benny Valgar on April 9, 1923, in a close 12-round decision in Buffalo. He lost to Sid Terris, a highly rated lightweight in a ten round points decision in New York on January 13, 1925.

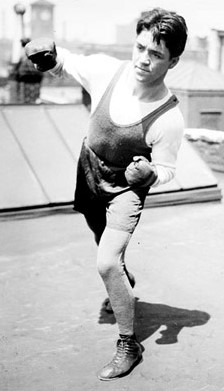
Sammy Mandell, Lightweight Champ July 1926-July 1930

Goodrich fought well known boxer Eddie "Kid" Wagner in front of a crowd of 5000 in Madison Square Garden in his first elimination match for Benny Leonard's Vacant World Lightweight Title. In a very close bout, the referees added two extra rounds to the original ten to help reach a decision. According to the Montreal Gazette, "the decision was unpopular, the crowd voicing its disapproval in a wild demonstration which continued for fifteen minutes after the end of the match". In May and June 1925, he beat Sammy Mandell and Benny Valgar, in Queensboro Stadium in Queens, both elimination bouts for the Vacant World Lightweight Title.

On July 13, 1925, in his final bout of the vacant Lightweight World Title tournament, he defeated Stanislaus Loayza at Queensboro Stadium in Queens in a second round technical knockout. In a strong showing by Goodrich, Loayza was down five times in the aggressively fought first round. Critical in the bout was the strength of Goodrich over the Chilean boxer, who claimed to have broken his ankle in his second knockdown. Loayza tried to continue gamely fighting through the first round, limping badly, but had to concede at the opening of the second.

== Gradual boxing decline ==
After winning the title, Goodrich's boxing record began a gentle decline in 1926, perhaps due to the superior quality of the boxers he faced. These included tough bouts with ranked boxers Solly Seeman, and Tod Morgan, and two bouts with Mushy Callahan. Morgan was Jr. Lightweight Champion at the time of his bout with Goodrich, having taken it in December 1925, and Callahan would later hold the Jr. Lightweight Championship. Goodrich lost each of his bouts with these lightweight champions.

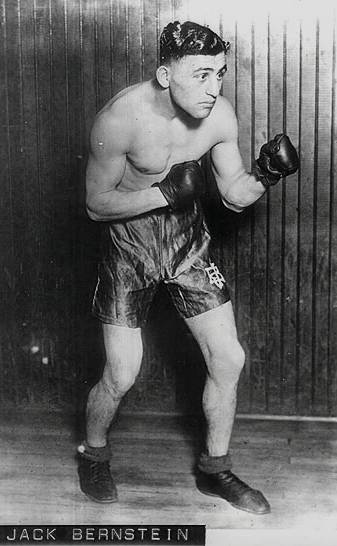
Jack Bernstein

In his remaining four years as a boxer, he continued to face stiff competition. He had a bout with Baby Joe Gans, two bouts with Jr. Lightweight ex-champion Jack Bernstein, and bouts with both Ruby Goldstein, and Eddie "Kid" Wagner.

Goodrich had a critically important bout with Sammy Mandell on September 25, 1928. At the time, Mandell still held the Lightweight Championship of the World. Goodrich won the bout with Mandell in a second round TKO, breaking Mandell's collarbone. After winning the bout decisively, Goodrich later regretted the decision he had made to fight Mandell over the required Lightweight limit, as he would have retaken the lightweight title if the fight had been a sanctioned lightweight championship.

By 1930, Goodrich lost most of his more well publicized bouts.

== Retirement and life after boxing ==
Goodrich retired from boxing in the 1930s. In his retirement, he operated a number of restaurants and taverns in the Buffalo area, eventually making enough to retire to Ft. Myers, Florida.

He died in Fort Myers on September 25, 1982.

== Professional boxing record ==
All information in this section is derived from BoxRec, unless otherwise stated.

=== Official record ===
195 fights	85 wins	34 losses
By knockout	12	0
By decision	70	34
By disqualification	3	0
Draws	21	
Newspaper decisions/draws	55	

All newspaper decisions are officially regarded as “no decision” bouts and are not counted in the win/loss/draw column.

No.	Result	Record	Opponent	Type	Round, time	Date	Age	Location	Note
195	Loss	85–34–21 (55)	Pete Susky	PTS	10	Sep 4, 1930	30 years, 36 days	Brooks Field, Scranton, Pennsylvania, U.S.	
194	Win	85–33–21 (55)	Pete Susky	SD	10	Aug 5, 1930	30 years, 6 days	Brooks Field, Scranton, Pennsylvania, U.S.	
193	Loss	84–33–21 (55)	Armando Aguilar	PTS	10	Jun 14, 1930	29 years, 319 days	Bonacker's Stadium, Rensselaer, New York, U.S.	
192	Loss	84–32–21 (55)	Pee Wee Jarrell	PTS	10	Jun 2, 1930	29 years, 307 days	Ramona Baseball Park, Grand Rapids, Michigan, U.S.	
191	Loss	84–31–21 (55)	Paul Pirrone	PTS	10	Apr 8, 1930	29 years, 252 days	Public Hall, Cleveland, Ohio, U.S.	
190	Loss	84–30–21 (55)	Eddie Murdock	PTS	10	Apr 3, 1930	29 years, 247 days	City Auditorium, Denver, Colorado, U.S.	
189	Draw	84–29–21 (55)	Gilbert Attell	PTS	10	Mar 20, 1930	29 years, 233 days	Civic Auditorium, Stockton, California, U.S.	
188	Loss	84–29–20 (55)	Madison J. Dix	PTS	10	Mar 6, 1930	29 years, 219 days	Dreamland Auditorium, San Francisco, California, U.S.	
187	Loss	84–28–20 (55)	Frankie Stetson	PTS	10	Feb 28, 1930	29 years, 213 days	Dreamland Auditorium, San Francisco, California, U.S.	
186	Win	84–27–20 (55)	Joe Trippe	PTS	10	Jan 24, 1930	29 years, 178 days	Broadway Auditorium, Buffalo, New York, U.S.	
185	Win	83–27–20 (55)	Benny Duke	PTS	6	Dec 26, 1929	29 years, 149 days	Broadway Auditorium, Buffalo, New York, U.S.	
184	Win	82–27–20 (55)	Johnny Ciccone	TKO	8 (10)	Dec 10, 1929	29 years, 133 days	Flint, Michigan, U.S.	
183	Win	81–27–20 (55)	Tommy Cello	PTS	10	Oct 28, 1929	29 years, 90 days	Flint, Michigan, U.S.	
182	Loss	80–27–20 (55)	Joey Harrison	PTS	10	Oct 17, 1929	29 years, 79 days	Armory, Paterson, New Jersey, U.S.	
181	Draw	80–26–20 (55)	Morrie Sherman	PTS	10	Oct 10, 1929	29 years, 72 days	Detroit, Michigan, U.S.	For Michigan State welterweight title
180	Win	80–26–19 (55)	Ralph "Sailor" Pacilio	PTS	10	Sep 5, 1929	29 years, 37 days	Utica Stadium, Utica, New York, U.S.	
179	Win	79–26–19 (55)	Benny Duke	PTS	10	Aug 30, 1929	29 years, 31 days	Ramona Baseball Park, Grand Rapids, Michigan, U.S.	
178	Draw	78–26–19 (55)	Joe Brown	PTS	10	Aug 7, 1929	29 years, 8 days	Delormier Stadium, Montreal, Quebec, Canada	
177	Loss	78–26–18 (55)	Benny Duke	PTS	10	Jul 31, 1929	29 years, 1 day	Grand Rapids, Michigan, U.S.	
176	Loss	78–25–18 (55)	Billy Petrolle	NWS	10	Jul 26, 1929	28 years, 361 days	Armory, Duluth, Minnesota, U.S.	
175	Win	78–25–18 (54)	Mushy Callahan	UD	15	Jun 17, 1929	28 years, 322 days	Bison Stadium, Buffalo, New York, U.S.	
174	Win	77–25–18 (54)	Thomas "Bucky" Lawless	PTS	10	May 6, 1929	28 years, 280 days	Broadway Auditorium, Buffalo, New York, U.S.	
173	Loss	76–25–18 (54)	King Tut	NWS	10	Apr 22, 1929	28 years, 266 days	Auditorium, Milwaukee, Wisconsin, U.S.	
172	Win	76–25–18 (53)	Jackie Shupack	PTS	10	Mar 14, 1929	28 years, 227 days	Armory, Paterson, New Jersey, U.S.	
171	Loss	75–25–18 (53)	Bruce Flowers	PTS	10	Feb 18, 1929	28 years, 203 days	Broadway Auditorium, Buffalo, New York, U.S.	
170	Win	75–24–18 (53)	Paul Pirrone	PTS	6	Feb 5, 1929	28 years, 190 days	Public Hall, Cleveland, Ohio, U.S.	
169	Loss	74–24–18 (53)	Lope Tenorio	UD	10	Jan 7, 1929	28 years, 161 days	Broadway Auditorium, Buffalo, New York, U.S.	
168	Win	74–23–18 (53)	Ruby Stein	KO	3 (10)	Dec 26, 1928	28 years, 149 days	Broadway Auditorium, Buffalo, New York, U.S.	
167	Loss	73–23–18 (53)	Bruce Flowers	PTS	10	Dec 14, 1928	28 years, 137 days	Madison Square Garden, New York City, New York, U.S.	
166	Win	73–22–18 (53)	Phil Goldstein	PTS	10	Nov 12, 1928	28 years, 105 days	Broadway Auditorium, Buffalo, New York, U.S.	
165	Win	72–22–18 (53)	Johnny Kid Blair	PTS	10	Oct 15, 1928	28 years, 77 days	Broadway Auditorium, Buffalo, New York, U.S.	
164	Win	71–22–18 (53)	Sammy Mandell	TKO	2 (10)	Sep 25, 1928	28 years, 57 days	Athletic Park, Flint, Michigan, U.S.	
163	Draw	70–22–18 (53)	Pete Petrolle	PTS	10	Sep 10, 1928	28 years, 42 days	Broadway Auditorium, Buffalo, New York, U.S.	
162	Win	70–22–17 (53)	Mickey O'Donnell	UD	6	Aug 20, 1928	28 years, 21 days	Bison Stadium, Buffalo, New York, U.S.	
161	Loss	69–22–17 (53)	Bobby Tracey	PTS	10	Feb 3, 1928	27 years, 188 days	Broadway Auditorium, Buffalo, New York, U.S.	
160	Win	69–21–17 (53)	Pep O'Brien	PTS	10	Jan 27, 1928	27 years, 181 days	Elks Club, Williamsport, Pennsylvania, U.S.	
159	Draw	68–21–17 (53)	Mickey Chapin	PTS	10	Dec 30, 1927	27 years, 153 days	Watres Armory, Scranton, Pennsylvania, U.S.	
158	Win	68–21–16 (53)	Tony Perry	PTS	6	Nov 28, 1927	27 years, 121 days	Town Hall, Scranton, Pennsylvania, U.S.	
157	Loss	67–21–16 (53)	Izzy Grove	PTS	6	Nov 2, 1927	27 years, 95 days	Pioneer Sporting Club, New York City, New York, U.S.	
156	Loss	67–20–16 (53)	Freddie Mueller	PTS	10	Oct 24, 1927	27 years, 86 days	Broadway Auditorium, Buffalo, New York, U.S.	
155	Draw	67–19–16 (53)	Bobby Tracey	PTS	15	Oct 7, 1927	27 years, 69 days	Broadway Auditorium, Buffalo, New York, U.S.	
154	Draw	67–19–15 (53)	Bobby Tracey	PTS	12	Sep 9, 1927	27 years, 41 days	Broadway Auditorium, Buffalo, New York, U.S.	
153	Win	67–19–14 (53)	Eddie Wagner	PTS	10	Aug 24, 1927	27 years, 25 days	Ebbets Field, New York City, New York, U.S.	
152	Win	66–19–14 (53)	Cuddy DeMarco	DQ	10 (10)	Aug 11, 1927	27 years, 12 days	Bison Stadium, Buffalo, New York, U.S.	
151	Loss	65–19–14 (53)	Ruby Goldstein	PTS	6	May 13, 1927	26 years, 287 days	Madison Square Garden, New York City, New York, U.S.	
150	Loss	65–18–14 (53)	Jack Bernstein	PTS	10	Apr 1, 1927	26 years, 245 days	Broadway Auditorium, Buffalo, New York, U.S.	
149	Loss	65–17–14 (53)	Jack Bernstein	PTS	10	Feb 27, 1927	26 years, 212 days	Broadway Arena, New York City, New York, U.S.	
148	Win	65–16–14 (53)	Freddie Mueller	UD	15	Jan 1, 1927	26 years, 155 days	Broadway Auditorium, Buffalo, New York, U.S.	
147	Loss	64–16–14 (53)	Baby Joe Gans	PTS	10	Oct 8, 1926	26 years, 70 days	Coliseum, Chicago, Illinois, U.S.	
146	Win	64–15–14 (53)	Russie LeRoy	PTS	8	Aug 20, 1926	26 years, 21 days	Ebbets Field, New York City, New York, U.S.	
145	Win	63–15–14 (53)	Jackie Brady	PTS	10	Jun 18, 1926	25 years, 323 days	Arena, Syracuse, New York, U.S.	
144	Loss	62–15–14 (53)	Mushy Callahan	PTS	10	May 18, 1926	25 years, 292 days	Arena, Vernon, California, U.S.	
143	Loss	62–14–14 (53)	Mushy Callahan	PTS	10	Apr 20, 1926	25 years, 264 days	Arena, Vernon, California, U.S.	
142	Loss	62–13–14 (53)	Russie LeRoy	NWS	10	Mar 5, 1926	25 years, 218 days	Fargo, North Dakota, U.S.	
141	Loss	62–13–14 (52)	Tod Morgan	NWS	10	Feb 22, 1926	25 years, 207 days	Auditorium, Milwaukee, Wisconsin, U.S.	
140	Win	62–13–14 (51)	Ray Romney	PTS	10	Feb 8, 1926	25 years, 193 days	Broadway Auditorium, Buffalo, New York, U.S.	
139	Loss	61–13–14 (51)	Solly Seeman	NWS	10	Jan 26, 1926	25 years, 180 days	Auditorium, Milwaukee, Wisconsin, U.S.	
138	Loss	61–13–14 (50)	Rocky Kansas	UD	15	Dec 7, 1925	25 years, 130 days	Broadway Auditorium, Buffalo, New York, U.S.	Lost NYSAC, NBA, and The Ring lightweight titles
137	Win	61–12–14 (50)	Clonie Tait	PTS	10	Nov 24, 1925	25 years, 117 days	Coliseum, Toronto, Ontario, Canada	
136	Loss	60–12–14 (50)	Gene Johnson	NWS	10	Oct 30, 1925	25 years, 92 days	Elizabeth, New Jersey, U.S.	
135	Draw	60–12–14 (49)	Billy Pollock	PTS	10	Sep 4, 1925	25 years, 36 days	Watres Armory, Scranton, Pennsylvania, U.S.	
134	Draw	60–12–13 (49)	Pep O'Brien	PTS	10	Aug 14, 1925	25 years, 15 days	Watres Armory, Scranton, Pennsylvania, U.S.	
133	Win	60–12–12 (49)	Stanislaus Loayza	TKO	2 (15), 0:35	Jul 13, 1925	24 years, 348 days	Queensboro Stadium, New York City, New York, U.S.	Won vacant NYSAC, NBA, and The Ring lightweight titles
132	Win	59–12–12 (49)	Benny Valger	UD	12	Jun 15, 1925	24 years, 320 days	Queensboro Stadium, New York City, New York, U.S.	
131	Win	58–12–12 (49)	Sammy Mandell	DQ	6 (12)	May 18, 1925	24 years, 292 days	Queensboro Stadium, New York City, New York, U.S.	
130	Win	57–12–12 (49)	Clyde Jeakle	PTS	12	Mar 9, 1925	24 years, 222 days	Madison Square Garden, New York City, New York, U.S.	
129	Win	56–12–12 (49)	Eddie Wagner	PTS	12 (10)	Feb 23, 1925	24 years, 208 days	Madison Square Garden, New York City, New York, U.S.	Draw after ten rounds so two more were added due to fight being an eliminator for vacant lightweight title
128	Win	55–12–12 (49)	Jimmy Fruzzetti	PTS	10	Feb 3, 1925	24 years, 188 days	Mechanics Building, Boston, Massachusetts, U.S.	
127	Win	54–12–12 (49)	Harry "Kid" Brown	SD	10	Jan 26, 1925	24 years, 180 days	Arena, Philadelphia, Pennsylvania, U.S.	
126	Loss	53–12–12 (49)	Sid Terris	PTS	10	Jan 13, 1925	24 years, 167 days	Pioneer Sporting Club, New York City, New York, U.S.	
125	Loss	53–11–12 (49)	Jimmy Fruzzetti	PTS	10	Dec 12, 1924	24 years, 135 days	Brockton A.A., Brockton, Massachusetts, U.S.	
124	Win	53–10–12 (49)	Joe Jawson	PTS	10	Nov 25, 1924	24 years, 118 days	Mechanics Building, Boston, Massachusetts, U.S.	
123	Win	52–10–12 (49)	Charley Manty	KO	9 (10)	Nov 14, 1924	24 years, 107 days	Brockton A.A., Brockton, Massachusetts, U.S.	
122	Win	51–10–12 (49)	Danny Cooney	PTS	10	Oct 31, 1924	24 years, 93 days	Pioneer Sporting Club, New York City, New York, U.S.	
121	Win	50–10–12 (49)	Mickey Papner	PTS	12	Oct 13, 1924	24 years, 75 days	104th Regiment Armory, Baltimore, New Jersey, U.S.	
120	Win	49–10–12 (49)	Johnny Darcy	NWS	12	Aug 11, 1924	24 years, 12 days	Oakland A.A., Jersey City, New Jersey, U.S.	
119	Loss	49–10–12 (48)	Al Shubert	PTS	10	Aug 8, 1924	24 years, 9 days	Cycledrome, New Bedford, Massachusetts, U.S.	
118	Draw	49–9–12 (48)	Bobby Tracey	PTS	10	May 30, 1924	23 years, 305 days	Town Hall, Scranton, Pennsylvania, U.S.	
117	Win	49–9–11 (48)	Charley Manty	SD	10	May 23, 1924	23 years, 298 days	New Bedford, Massachusetts, U.S.	
116	Loss	48–9–11 (48)	Augustine "Bud" Christiano	PTS	8	May 19, 1924	23 years, 294 days	Shetzline Ballpark, Philadelphia, Pennsylvania, U.S.	
115	Win	48–8–11 (48)	Andy Chaney	UD	10	May 5, 1924	23 years, 280 days	Broadway Auditorium, Buffalo, New York, U.S.	
114	Draw	47–8–11 (48)	Harry Cook	PTS	10	Mar 24, 1924	23 years, 238 days	Broadway Auditorium, Buffalo, New York, U.S.	
113	Win	47–8–10 (48)	Teddy Meyers	SD	10	Mar 3, 1924	23 years, 217 days	Town Hall, Scranton, Pennsylvania, U.S.	
112	Loss	46–8–10 (48)	Alex Hart	NWS	10	Feb 20, 1924	23 years, 205 days	State Theater, Lorain, Ohio, U.S.	
111	Win	46–8–10 (47)	Charley Manty	PTS	10	Feb 11, 1924	23 years, 196 days	New Bedford, Massachusetts, U.S.	
110	Win	45–8–10 (47)	Pedro Campo	PTS	6	Feb 4, 1924	23 years, 189 days	Broadway Auditorium, Buffalo, New York, U.S.	
109	Win	44–8–10 (47)	Johnny Darcy	NWS	12	Jan 29, 1924	23 years, 183 days	Stadium A.C., Jersey City, New Jersey, U.S.	
108	Win	44–8–10 (46)	Sammy Vogel	PTS	12	Dec 4, 1923	23 years, 127 days	Pioneer Sporting Club, New York City, New York, U.S.	
107	Loss	43–8–10 (46)	Teddy Meyers	PTS	12	Nov 29, 1923	23 years, 122 days	Broadway Auditorium, Buffalo, New York, U.S.	
106	Win	43–7–10 (46)	Benny Cohen	NWS	12	Nov 1, 1923	23 years, 94 days	Laurel Garden, Newark, New Jersey, U.S.	
105	Draw	43–7–10 (45)	Chubby Brown	NWS	10	Oct 17, 1923	23 years, 79 days	South Main Street Armory, Wilkes-Barre, Pennsylvania, U.S.	
104	Loss	43–7–10 (44)	Louis "Kid" Kaplan	PTS	10	Sep 28, 1923	23 years, 60 days	Madison Square Garden, New York City, New York, U.S.	
103	Win	43–6–10 (44)	Alex Hart	PTS	15	Sep 18, 1923	23 years, 50 days	Pioneer Sporting Club, New York City, New York, U.S.	
102	Win	42–6–10 (44)	Pal Moran	PTS	10	Sep 4, 1923	23 years, 36 days	Queensboro Stadium, New York City, New York, U.S.	
101	Win	41–6–10 (44)	Tommy Noble	PTS	12	Jul 25, 1923	22 years, 360 days	Johnson Field, Johnson City, New York, U.S.	
100	Loss	40–6–10 (44)	Benny Valger	NWS	10	Jul 9, 1923	22 years, 344 days	Town Hall, Scranton, Pennsylvania, U.S.	
99	Win	40–6–10 (43)	Phil Logan	PTS	12	Jun 22, 1923	22 years, 327 days	Johnson Field, Johnson City, New York, U.S.	
98	Draw	39–6–10 (43)	Willie Herman	PTS	10	Apr 23, 1923	22 years, 267 days	Broadway Auditorium, Buffalo, New York, U.S.	
97	Draw	39–6–9 (43)	Benny Valger	MD	12	Apr 9, 1923	22 years, 253 days	Broadway Auditorium, Buffalo, New York, U.S.	
96	Win	39–6–8 (43)	Pedro Campo	NWS	10	Apr 3, 1923	22 years, 247 days	109th Infantry Armory, Scranton, Pennsylvania, U.S.	
95	Win	39–6–8 (42)	Frankie Callahan	PTS	10	Apr 2, 1923	22 years, 246 days	Broadway Auditorium, Buffalo, New York, U.S.	
94	Win	38–6–8 (42)	Chubby Brown	UD	12	Mar 12, 1923	22 years, 225 days	Convention Hall, Rochester, New York, U.S.	
93	Win	37–6–8 (42)	Teddy Meyers	PTS	10	Mar 5, 1923	22 years, 218 days	Broadway Auditorium, Buffalo, New York, U.S.	Won inaugural Buffalo junior lightweight title
92	Win	36–6–8 (42)	Pep O'Brien	NWS	10	Mar 1, 1923	22 years, 214 days	Town Hall, Scranton, Pennsylvania, U.S.	
91	Loss	36–6–8 (41)	Sid Barbarian	NWS	10	Feb 12, 1923	22 years, 197 days	Danceland Arena, Detroit, Michigan, U.S.	
90	Draw	36–6–8 (40)	Teddy Meyers	PTS	10	Feb 5, 1923	22 years, 190 days	Broadway Auditorium, Buffalo, New York, U.S.	
89	Win	36–6–7 (40)	Sammy Berne	PTS	10	Jan 15, 1923	22 years, 159 days	Broadway Auditorium, Buffalo, New York, U.S.	
88	Loss	35–6–7 (40)	Billy DeFoe	NWS	10	Dec 28, 1922	22 years, 151 days	Town Hall, Scranton, Pennsylvania, U.S.	
87	Win	35–6–7 (39)	Tommy Noble	PTS	10	Dec 23, 1922	22 years, 146 days	Grand Opera House, Hamilton, Ontario, Canada	
86	Loss	34–6–7 (39)	Billy DeFoe	NWS	10	Dec 8, 1922	22 years, 131 days	Town Hall, Scranton, Pennsylvania, U.S.	
85	Win	34–6–7 (38)	Red Cap Wilson	PTS	6	Nov 1, 1922	22 years, 94 days	Madison Square Garden, New York City, New York, U.S.	
84	Loss	33–6–7 (38)	Charlie O'Connell	PTS	10	Oct 9, 1922	22 years, 71 days	Broadway Auditorium, Buffalo, New York, U.S.	
83	Loss	33–5–7 (38)	Charlie O'Connell	NWS	10	Sep 4, 1922	22 years, 36 days	Erie, Pennsylvania, U.S.	
82	Win	33–5–7 (37)	Mixer Mitchell	PTS	10	Aug 9, 1922	22 years, 10 days	Broadway Auditorium, Buffalo, New York, U.S.	
81	Win	32–5–7 (37)	Tommy Noble	PTS	10	Jul 17, 1922	21 years, 352 days	Broadway Auditorium, Buffalo, New York, U.S.	
80	Loss	31–5–7 (37)	Tommy Noble	PTS	10	Jun 9, 1922	21 years, 314 days	Civic Arena, Toronto, Ontario, Canada	
79	Draw	31–4–7 (37)	Tommy Noble	PTS	10	May 24, 1922	21 years, 298 days	Civic Arena, Toronto, Ontario, Canada	
78	Win	31–4–6 (37)	Dick Conlon	NWS	10	May 19, 1922	21 years, 293 days	Erie, Pennsylvania, U.S.	
77	Loss	31–4–6 (36)	Al Murphy	NWS	10	May 8, 1922	21 years, 282 days	Athletic Park, Scranton, Pennsylvania, U.S.	
76	Win	31–4–6 (35)	Rube Cohen	KO	5 (10)	May 1, 1922	21 years, 275 days	Broadway Auditorium, Buffalo, New York, U.S.	
75	Loss	30–4–6 (35)	Johnny Dundee	SD	10	Apr 4, 1922	21 years, 248 days	Civic Arena, Toronto, Ontario, Canada	
74	Win	30–3–6 (35)	Freddie Jacks	SD	10	Feb 24, 1922	21 years, 209 days	Civic Arena, Toronto, Ontario, Canada	
73	Win	29–3–6 (35)	Bobby Michaels	DQ	1 (10)	Feb 13, 1922	21 years, 198 days	Broadway Auditorium, Buffalo, New York, U.S.	Low blow
72	Win	28–3–6 (35)	Mixer Mitchell	PTS	15	Feb 3, 1922	21 years, 188 days	Arena, Syracuse, New York, U.S.	
71	Win	27–3–6 (35)	Danny Grieves	KO	5 (10)	Jan 19, 1922	21 years, 173 days	Town Hall, Scranton, Pennsylvania, U.S.	
70	Win	26–3–6 (35)	Young Henny	PTS	12	Dec 16, 1921	21 years, 139 days	Arena, Syracuse, New York, U.S.	
69	Win	25–3–6 (35)	Red Mack	PTS	12	Dec 5, 1921	21 years, 128 days	Arena, Syracuse, New York, U.S.	
68	Win	24–3–6 (35)	Freddie Jacks	PTS	12	Nov 24, 1921	21 years, 117 days	Arena, Syracuse, New York, U.S.	
67	Win	23–3–6 (35)	Battling Johnson	PTS	10	Nov 11, 1921	21 years, 104 days	Arena, Syracuse, New York, U.S.	
66	Win	22–3–6 (35)	Fritz Meiler	UD	10	Sep 26, 1921	21 years, 58 days	Broadway Auditorium, Buffalo, New York, U.S.	
65	Loss	21–3–6 (35)	Chubby Brown	SD	10	Aug 29, 1921	21 years, 30 days	Convention Hall, Rochester, New York, U.S.	
64	Draw	21–2–6 (35)	Teddy Meyers	PTS	10	Aug 19, 1921	21 years, 20 days	Bison Stadium, Buffalo, New York, U.S.	
63	Win	21–2–5 (35)	Johnny Rose	PTS	10	Aug 4, 1921	21 years, 5 days	Celeron Ball Park, Jamestown, New York, U.S.	
62	Win	20–2–5 (35)	Herman Smith	MD	10	Jun 27, 1921	20 years, 332 days	Broadway Auditorium, Buffalo, New York, U.S.	
61	Win	19–2–5 (35)	Phil Logan	PTS	15	Jun 10, 1921	20 years, 315 days	Bison Stadium, Buffalo, New York, U.S.	
60	Win	18–2–5 (35)	Chubby Brown	PTS	12	May 2, 1921	20 years, 276 days	Convention Hall, Rochester, New York, U.S.	
59	Win	17–2–5 (35)	Phil Logan	PTS	12	Apr 21, 1921	20 years, 265 days	Broadway Auditorium, Buffalo, New York, U.S.	
58	Win	16–2–5 (35)	Joe Jawson	PTS	10	Feb 21, 1921	20 years, 206 days	The Armouries, Toronto, Ontario, Canada	
57	Win	15–2–5 (35)	Harry Bingham	PTS	10	Feb 18, 1921	20 years, 203 days	Hamilton, Ontario, Canada	
56	Win	14–2–5 (35)	Joe Reno	PTS	15	Jan 8, 1921	21 years, 150 days	Broadway Auditorium, Buffalo, New York, U.S.	
55	Win	13–2–5 (35)	Jesse Morey	TKO	8 (10)	Dec 27, 1920	20 years, 150 days	Broadway Auditorium, Buffalo, New York, U.S.	
54	Win	12–2–5 (35)	Nick Michaels	PTS	10	Dec 13, 1920	20 years, 136 days	Broadway Auditorium, Buffalo, New York, U.S.	
53	Win	11–2–5 (35)	Chip Davis	UD	10	Dec 6, 1920	20 years, 129 days	Broadway Auditorium, Buffalo, New York, U.S.	
52	Draw	10–2–5 (35)	Augustine "Bud" Christiano	PTS	12	Oct 11, 1920	20 years, 73 days	Bison Stadium, Buffalo, New York, U.S.	
51	Win	10–2–4 (35)	Danny Dillon	NWS	10	Aug 24, 1920	20 years, 20 days	Bison Stadium, Buffalo, New York, U.S.	
50	Draw	10–2–4 (34)	Eddie Walsh	NWS	10	Aug 19, 1920	20 years, 20 days	Athletic Park, Scranton, Pennsylvania, U.S.	
49	Loss	10–2–4 (33)	Augustine "Bud" Christiano	NWS	10	Aug 18, 1920	20 years, 19 days	Velodrome Park, Buffalo, New York, U.S.	
48	Loss	10–2–4 (32)	Augustine "Bud" Christiano	NWS	10	Aug 4, 1920	20 years, 5 days	Velodrome Park, Buffalo, New York, U.S.	
47	Win	10–2–4 (31)	Herman Smith	NWS	10	Jun 7, 1920	19 years, 313 days	Broadway Auditorium, Buffalo, New York, U.S.	
46	Loss	10–2–4 (30)	Benny Valger	NWS	10	May 10, 1920	19 years, 285 days	Broadway Auditorium, Buffalo, New York, U.S.	
45	Win	10–2–4 (29)	Teddy Meyers	NWS	10	May 3, 1920	19 years, 278 days	Broadway Auditorium, Buffalo, New York, U.S.	
44	Win	10–2–4 (28)	Dick Atkins	PTS	10	Apr 21, 1920	19 years, 266 days	Grand Opera House, Hamilton, Ontario, Canada	
43	Win	9–2–4 (28)	Harry Bingham	PTS	6	Apr 9, 1920	19 years, 254 days	Grand Opera House, Hamilton, Ontario, Canada	
42	Win	8–2–4 (28)	Chick Rodgers	NWS	10	Mar 25, 1920	19 years, 239 days	Broadway Auditorium, Buffalo, New York, U.S.	
41	Draw	8–2–4 (27)	Dick Loadman	NWS	10	Mar 12, 1920	19 years, 226 days	Broadway Auditorium, Buffalo, New York, U.S.	
40	Win	8–2–4 (26)	Phil Logan	NWS	10	Mar 8, 1920	19 years, 222 days	Broadway Auditorium, Buffalo, New York, U.S.	
39	Win	8–2–4 (25)	Chip Davis	NWS	10	Feb 27, 1920	19 years, 212 days	Broadway Auditorium, Buffalo, New York, U.S.	
38	Win	8–2–4 (24)	Young Joey Mendo	NWS	10	Feb 23, 1920	19 years, 208 days	Broadway Auditorium, Buffalo, New York, U.S.	
37	Win	8–2–4 (23)	Scotty Lisner	PTS	10	Jan 30, 1920	19 years, 184 days	Massey Hall, Toronto, Ontario, Canada	
36	Win	7–2–4 (23)	Teddy Meyers	NWS	10	Jan 1, 1920	19 years, 155 days	Broadway Auditorium, Buffalo, New York, U.S.	
35	Win	7–2–4 (22)	Johnny Dwyer	TKO	5 (10)	Dec 16, 1919	19 years, 139 days	Broadway Auditorium, Buffalo, New York, U.S.	
34	Loss	6–2–4 (22)	Al Kale	NWS	6	Dec 12, 1919	19 years, 135 days	Maltosia Hall, Buffalo, New York, U.S.	
33	Win	6–2–4 (21)	Scotty Lisner	PTS	10	Nov 27, 1919	19 years, 120 days	Massey Hall, Toronto, Ontario, Canada	
32	Win	5–2–4 (21)	Johnny McCoy	NWS	6	Nov 25, 1919	19 years, 118 days	Miller's Hall, Buffalo, New York, U.S.	
31	Draw	5–2–4 (20)	Dick Atkins	PTS	10	Nov 21, 1919	19 years, 114 days	Hamilton, Ontario, Canada	
30	Win	5–2–3 (20)	Chip Davis	NWS	10	Nov 10, 1919	19 years, 103 days	Broadway Auditorium, Buffalo, New York, U.S.	
29	Win	5–2–3 (19)	Chip Davis	NWS	6	Oct 30, 1919	19 years, 92 days	Broadway Auditorium, Buffalo, New York, U.S.	
28	Win	5–2–3 (18)	Frankie Kirsch	NWS	6	Oct 10, 1919	19 years, 72 days	Broadway Auditorium, Buffalo, New York, U.S.	
27	Win	5–2–3 (17)	Bobby Eber	PTS	10	Sep 26, 1919	19 years, 58 days	London, Ontario, Canada	
26	Draw	4–2–3 (17)	Dick Atkins	PTS	10	Sep 23, 1919	19 years, 55 days	Hamilton, Ontario, Canada	
25	Loss	4–2–2 (17)	Dick Atkins	PTS	10	Sep 19, 1919	19 years, 51 days	Massey Hall, Toronto, Ontario, Canada	
24	Win	4–1–2 (17)	Maxie Green	NWS	6	Aug 18, 1919	19 years, 19 days	Bison Stadium, Buffalo, New York, U.S.	
23	Loss	4–1–2 (16)	Bobby Eber	PTS	10	Aug 8, 1919	19 years, 9 days	Hamilton, Ontario, Canada	
22	Draw	4–0–2 (16)	Dick Atkins	PTS	10	Aug 1, 1919	19 years, 2 days	Island Stadium, Toronto, Ontario, Canada	
21	Win	4–0–1 (16)	Dick Atkins	PTS	10	Jul 18, 1919	18 years, 353 days	Island Stadium, Toronto, Ontario, Canada	
20	Win	3–0–1 (16)	Cy Martin	NWS	4	Jun 30, 1919	18 years, 335 days	Doll's park, Buffalo, New York, U.S.	
19	Draw	3–0–1 (15)	Bobby Eber	PTS	10	Jun 3, 1919	18 years, 308 days	Welland, Ontario, Canada	
18	Loss	3–0 (15)	Johnny McCoy	NWS	6	May 6, 1919	18 years, 280 days	Broadway Auditorium, Buffalo, New York, U.S.	
17	Win	3–0 (14)	Willie Duffy	NWS	6	Apr 25, 1919	18 years, 269 days	Auburn, New York, U.S.	
16	Win	3–0 (13)	Cy Martin	NWS	6	Apr 24, 1919	18 years, 268 days	Olean, New York, U.S.	
15	Win	3–0 (12)	Irish Kennedy	NWS	6	Apr 14, 1919	18 years, 258 days	Broadway Auditorium, Buffalo, New York, U.S.	
14	Win	3–0 (11)	Herman Smith	NWS	6	Apr 8, 1919	18 years, 252 days	Broadway Auditorium, Buffalo, New York, U.S.	
13	Win	3–0 (10)	Bobby Eber	NWS	6	Apr 4, 1919	18 years, 248 days	Superior A.C., Buffalo, New York, U.S.	
12	Win	3–0 (9)	Johnny Dunn	NWS	6	Mar 21, 1919	18 years, 234 days	Superior A.C., Buffalo, New York, U.S.	
11	Win	3–0 (8)	Cy Martin	NWS	6	Mar 17, 1919	18 years, 230 days	Broadway Auditorium, Buffalo, New York, U.S.	
10	Draw	3–0 (7)	Eddie Harling	NWS	6	Mar 10, 1919	18 years, 223 days	Broadway Auditorium, Buffalo, New York, U.S.	
9	Win	3–0 (6)	George Ranney	NWS	4	Dec 30, 1918	18 years, 153 days	Broadway Auditorium, Buffalo, New York, U.S.	
8	Win	3–0 (5)	Battling Leonard	NWS	4	Dec 17, 1918	18 years, 140 days	Broadway Auditorium, Buffalo, New York, U.S.	
7	Win	3–0 (4)	Joe Marcus	NWS	4	Jun 24, 1918	17 years, 329 days	Broadway Auditorium, Buffalo, New York, U.S.	
6	Win	3–0 (3)	Art Madden	KO	3 (4)	May 9, 1918	17 years, 283 days	Eagles Hall, Buffalo, New York, U.S.	
5	Win	2–0 (3)	Cutie Kaufman	KO	3 (4)	May 3, 1918	17 years, 277 days	Broadway Auditorium, Buffalo, New York, U.S.	
4	Win	1–0 (3)	Cutie Kaufman	NWS	4	Apr 12, 1918	17 years, 256 days	St. Patrick's A.C., Buffalo, New York, U.S.	
3	Win	1–0 (2)	Chip Davis	NWS	4	Mar 22, 1918	17 years, 215 days	Broadway Auditorium, Buffalo, New York, U.S.	
2	Win	1–0 (1)	Battling Leonard	NWS	4	Feb 26, 1918	17 years, 211 days	Broadway Auditorium, Buffalo, New York, U.S.	
1	Win	1–0	Battling Leonard	KO	1 (4)	Feb 6, 1918	17 years, 191 days	St. Mary's Catholic Club, Buffalo, New York, U.S.	

=== Unofficial record ===
195 fights	118 wins	52 losses
By knockout	12	0
By decision	103	52
By disqualification	3	0
Draws	25	

Record with the inclusion of newspaper decisions in the win/loss/draw column.

No.	Result	Record	Opponent	Type	Round, time	Date	Age	Location	Note
195	Loss	118–52–25	Pete Susky	PTS	10	Sep 4, 1930	30 years, 36 days	Brooks Field, Scranton, Pennsylvania, U.S.	
194	Win	118–51–25	Pete Susky	SD	10	Aug 5, 1930	30 years, 6 days	Brooks Field, Scranton, Pennsylvania, U.S.	
193	Loss	117–51–25	Armando Aguilar	PTS	10	Jun 14, 1930	29 years, 319 days	Bonacker's Stadium, Rensselaer, New York, U.S.	
192	Loss	117–50–25	Pee Wee Jarrell	PTS	10	Jun 2, 1930	29 years, 307 days	Ramona Baseball Park, Grand Rapids, Michigan, U.S.	
191	Loss	117–49–25	Paul Pirrone	PTS	10	Apr 8, 1930	29 years, 252 days	Public Hall, Cleveland, Ohio, U.S.	
190	Loss	117–48–25	Eddie Murdock	PTS	10	Apr 3, 1930	29 years, 247 days	City Auditorium, Denver, Colorado, U.S.	
189	Draw	117–47–25	Gilbert Attell	PTS	10	Mar 20, 1930	29 years, 233 days	Civic Auditorium, Stockton, California, U.S.	
188	Loss	117–47–24	Madison J. Dix	PTS	10	Mar 6, 1930	29 years, 219 days	Dreamland Auditorium, San Francisco, California, U.S.	
187	Loss	117–46–24	Frankie Stetson	PTS	10	Feb 28, 1930	29 years, 213 days	Dreamland Auditorium, San Francisco, California, U.S.	
186	Win	117–45–24	Joe Trippe	PTS	10	Jan 24, 1930	29 years, 178 days	Broadway Auditorium, Buffalo, New York, U.S.	
185	Win	116–45–24	Benny Duke	PTS	6	Dec 26, 1929	29 years, 149 days	Broadway Auditorium, Buffalo, New York, U.S.	
184	Win	115–45–24	Johnny Ciccone	TKO	8 (10)	Dec 10, 1929	29 years, 133 days	Flint, Michigan, U.S.	
183	Win	114–45–24	Tommy Cello	PTS	10	Oct 28, 1929	29 years, 90 days	Flint, Michigan, U.S.	
182	Loss	113–45–24	Joey Harrison	PTS	10	Oct 17, 1929	29 years, 79 days	Armory, Paterson, New Jersey, U.S.	
181	Draw	113–44–24	Morrie Sherman	PTS	10	Oct 10, 1929	29 years, 72 days	Detroit, Michigan, U.S.	For Michigan State welterweight title
180	Win	113–44–23	Ralph "Sailor" Pacilio	PTS	10	Sep 5, 1929	29 years, 37 days	Utica Stadium, Utica, New York, U.S.	
179	Win	112–44–23	Benny Duke	PTS	10	Aug 30, 1929	29 years, 31 days	Ramona Baseball Park, Grand Rapids, Michigan, U.S.	
178	Draw	111–44–23	Joe Brown	PTS	10	Aug 7, 1929	29 years, 8 days	Delormier Stadium, Montreal, Quebec, Canada	
177	Loss	111–44–22	Benny Duke	PTS	10	Jul 31, 1929	29 years, 1 day	Grand Rapids, Michigan, U.S.	
176	Loss	111–43–22	Billy Petrolle	NWS	10	Jul 26, 1929	28 years, 361 days	Armory, Duluth, Minnesota, U.S.	
175	Win	111–42–22	Mushy Callahan	UD	15	Jun 17, 1929	28 years, 322 days	Bison Stadium, Buffalo, New York, U.S.	
174	Win	110–42–22	Thomas "Bucky" Lawless	PTS	10	May 6, 1929	28 years, 280 days	Broadway Auditorium, Buffalo, New York, U.S.	
173	Loss	109–42–22	King Tut	NWS	10	Apr 22, 1929	28 years, 266 days	Auditorium, Milwaukee, Wisconsin, U.S.	
172	Win	109–41–22	Jackie Shupack	PTS	10	Mar 14, 1929	28 years, 227 days	Armory, Paterson, New Jersey, U.S.	
171	Loss	108–41–22	Bruce Flowers	PTS	10	Feb 18, 1929	28 years, 203 days	Broadway Auditorium, Buffalo, New York, U.S.	
170	Win	108–40–22	Paul Pirrone	PTS	6	Feb 5, 1929	28 years, 190 days	Public Hall, Cleveland, Ohio, U.S.	
169	Loss	107–40–22	Lope Tenorio	UD	10	Jan 7, 1929	28 years, 161 days	Broadway Auditorium, Buffalo, New York, U.S.	
168	Win	107–39–22	Ruby Stein	KO	3 (10)	Dec 26, 1928	28 years, 149 days	Broadway Auditorium, Buffalo, New York, U.S.	
167	Loss	106–39–22	Bruce Flowers	PTS	10	Dec 14, 1928	28 years, 137 days	Madison Square Garden, New York City, New York, U.S.	
166	Win	106–38–22	Phil Goldstein	PTS	10	Nov 12, 1928	28 years, 105 days	Broadway Auditorium, Buffalo, New York, U.S.	
165	Win	105–38–22	Johnny Kid Blair	PTS	10	Oct 15, 1928	28 years, 77 days	Broadway Auditorium, Buffalo, New York, U.S.	
164	Win	104–38–22	Sammy Mandell	TKO	2 (10)	Sep 25, 1928	28 years, 57 days	Athletic Park, Flint, Michigan, U.S.	
163	Draw	103–38–22	Pete Petrolle	PTS	10	Sep 10, 1928	28 years, 42 days	Broadway Auditorium, Buffalo, New York, U.S.	
162	Win	103–38–21	Mickey O'Donnell	UD	6	Aug 20, 1928	28 years, 21 days	Bison Stadium, Buffalo, New York, U.S.	
161	Loss	102–38–21	Bobby Tracey	PTS	10	Feb 3, 1928	27 years, 188 days	Broadway Auditorium, Buffalo, New York, U.S.	
160	Win	102–37–21	Pep O'Brien	PTS	10	Jan 27, 1928	27 years, 181 days	Elks Club, Williamsport, Pennsylvania, U.S.	
159	Draw	101–37–21	Mickey Chapin	PTS	10	Dec 30, 1927	27 years, 153 days	Watres Armory, Scranton, Pennsylvania, U.S.	
158	Win	101–37–20	Tony Perry	PTS	6	Nov 28, 1927	27 years, 121 days	Town Hall, Scranton, Pennsylvania, U.S.	
157	Loss	100–37–20	Izzy Grove	PTS	6	Nov 2, 1927	27 years, 95 days	Pioneer Sporting Club, New York City, New York, U.S.	
156	Loss	100–36–20	Freddie Mueller	PTS	10	Oct 24, 1927	27 years, 86 days	Broadway Auditorium, Buffalo, New York, U.S.	
155	Draw	100–35–20	Bobby Tracey	PTS	15	Oct 7, 1927	27 years, 69 days	Broadway Auditorium, Buffalo, New York, U.S.	
154	Draw	100–35–19	Bobby Tracey	PTS	12	Sep 9, 1927	27 years, 41 days	Broadway Auditorium, Buffalo, New York, U.S.	
153	Win	100–35–18	Eddie Wagner	PTS	10	Aug 24, 1927	27 years, 25 days	Ebbets Field, New York City, New York, U.S.	
152	Win	99–35–18	Cuddy DeMarco	DQ	10 (10)	Aug 11, 1927	27 years, 12 days	Bison Stadium, Buffalo, New York, U.S.	
151	Loss	98–35–18	Ruby Goldstein	PTS	6	May 13, 1927	26 years, 287 days	Madison Square Garden, New York City, New York, U.S.	
150	Loss	98–34–18	Jack Bernstein	PTS	10	Apr 1, 1927	26 years, 245 days	Broadway Auditorium, Buffalo, New York, U.S.	
149	Loss	98–33–18	Jack Bernstein	PTS	10	Feb 27, 1927	26 years, 212 days	Broadway Arena, New York City, New York, U.S.	
148	Win	98–32–18	Freddie Mueller	UD	15	Jan 1, 1927	26 years, 155 days	Broadway Auditorium, Buffalo, New York, U.S.	
147	Loss	97–32–18	Baby Joe Gans	PTS	10	Oct 8, 1926	26 years, 70 days	Coliseum, Chicago, Illinois, U.S.	
146	Win	97–31–18	Russie LeRoy	PTS	8	Aug 20, 1926	26 years, 21 days	Ebbets Field, New York City, New York, U.S.	
145	Win	96–31–18	Jackie Brady	PTS	10	Jun 18, 1926	25 years, 323 days	Arena, Syracuse, New York, U.S.	
144	Loss	95–31–18	Mushy Callahan	PTS	10	May 18, 1926	25 years, 292 days	Arena, Vernon, California, U.S.	
143	Loss	95–30–18	Mushy Callahan	PTS	10	Apr 20, 1926	25 years, 264 days	Arena, Vernon, California, U.S.	
142	Loss	95–29–18	Russie LeRoy	NWS	10	Mar 5, 1926	25 years, 218 days	Fargo, North Dakota, U.S.	
141	Loss	95–28–18	Tod Morgan	NWS	10	Feb 22, 1926	25 years, 207 days	Auditorium, Milwaukee, Wisconsin, U.S.	
140	Win	95–27–18	Ray Romney	PTS	10	Feb 8, 1926	25 years, 193 days	Broadway Auditorium, Buffalo, New York, U.S.	
139	Loss	94–27–18	Solly Seeman	NWS	10	Jan 26, 1926	25 years, 180 days	Auditorium, Milwaukee, Wisconsin, U.S.	
138	Loss	94–26–18	Rocky Kansas	UD	15	Dec 7, 1925	25 years, 130 days	Broadway Auditorium, Buffalo, New York, U.S.	Lost NYSAC, NBA, and The Ring lightweight titles
137	Win	94–25–18	Clonie Tait	PTS	10	Nov 24, 1925	25 years, 117 days	Coliseum, Toronto, Ontario, Canada	
136	Loss	93–25–18	Gene Johnson	NWS	10	Oct 30, 1925	25 years, 92 days	Elizabeth, New Jersey, U.S.	
135	Draw	93–24–18	Billy Pollock	PTS	10	Sep 4, 1925	25 years, 36 days	Watres Armory, Scranton, Pennsylvania, U.S.	
134	Draw	93–24–17	Pep O'Brien	PTS	10	Aug 14, 1925	25 years, 15 days	Watres Armory, Scranton, Pennsylvania, U.S.	
133	Win	93–24–16	Stanislaus Loayza	TKO	2 (15), 0:35	Jul 13, 1925	24 years, 348 days	Queensboro Stadium, New York City, New York, U.S.	Won vacant NYSAC, NBA, and The Ring lightweight titles
132	Win	92–24–16	Benny Valger	UD	12	Jun 15, 1925	24 years, 320 days	Queensboro Stadium, New York City, New York, U.S.	
131	Win	91–24–16	Sammy Mandell	DQ	6 (12)	May 18, 1925	24 years, 292 days	Queensboro Stadium, New York City, New York, U.S.	
130	Win	90–24–16	Clyde Jeakle	PTS	12	Mar 9, 1925	24 years, 222 days	Madison Square Garden, New York City, New York, U.S.	
129	Win	89–24–16	Eddie Wagner	PTS	12 (10)	Feb 23, 1925	24 years, 208 days	Madison Square Garden, New York City, New York, U.S.	Draw after ten rounds so two more were added due to fight being an eliminator for vacant lightweight title
128	Win	88–24–16	Jimmy Fruzzetti	PTS	10	Feb 3, 1925	24 years, 188 days	Mechanics Building, Boston, Massachusetts, U.S.	
127	Win	87–24–16	Harry "Kid" Brown	SD	10	Jan 26, 1925	24 years, 180 days	Arena, Philadelphia, Pennsylvania, U.S.	
126	Loss	86–24–16	Sid Terris	PTS	10	Jan 13, 1925	24 years, 167 days	Pioneer Sporting Club, New York City, New York, U.S.	
125	Loss	86–23–16	Jimmy Fruzzetti	PTS	10	Dec 12, 1924	24 years, 135 days	Brockton A.A., Brockton, Massachusetts, U.S.	
124	Win	86–22–16	Joe Jawson	PTS	10	Nov 25, 1924	24 years, 118 days	Mechanics Building, Boston, Massachusetts, U.S.	
123	Win	85–22–16	Charley Manty	KO	9 (10)	Nov 14, 1924	24 years, 107 days	Brockton A.A., Brockton, Massachusetts, U.S.	
122	Win	84–22–16	Danny Cooney	PTS	10	Oct 31, 1924	24 years, 93 days	Pioneer Sporting Club, New York City, New York, U.S.	
121	Win	83–22–16	Mickey Papner	PTS	12	Oct 13, 1924	24 years, 75 days	104th Regiment Armory, Baltimore, New Jersey, U.S.	
120	Win	82–22–16	Johnny Darcy	NWS	12	Aug 11, 1924	24 years, 12 days	Oakland A.A., Jersey City, New Jersey, U.S.	
119	Loss	81–22–16	Al Shubert	PTS	10	Aug 8, 1924	24 years, 9 days	Cycledrome, New Bedford, Massachusetts, U.S.	
118	Draw	81–21–16	Bobby Tracey	PTS	10	May 30, 1924	23 years, 305 days	Town Hall, Scranton, Pennsylvania, U.S.	
117	Win	81–21–15	Charley Manty	SD	10	May 23, 1924	23 years, 298 days	New Bedford, Massachusetts, U.S.	
116	Loss	80–21–15	Augustine "Bud" Christiano	PTS	8	May 19, 1924	23 years, 294 days	Shetzline Ballpark, Philadelphia, Pennsylvania, U.S.	
115	Win	80–20–15	Andy Chaney	UD	10	May 5, 1924	23 years, 280 days	Broadway Auditorium, Buffalo, New York, U.S.	
114	Draw	79–20–15	Harry Cook	PTS	10	Mar 24, 1924	23 years, 238 days	Broadway Auditorium, Buffalo, New York, U.S.	
113	Win	79–20–14	Teddy Meyers	SD	10	Mar 3, 1924	23 years, 217 days	Town Hall, Scranton, Pennsylvania, U.S.	
112	Loss	78–20–14	Alex Hart	NWS	10	Feb 20, 1924	23 years, 205 days	State Theater, Lorain, Ohio, U.S.	
111	Win	78–19–14	Charley Manty	PTS	10	Feb 11, 1924	23 years, 196 days	New Bedford, Massachusetts, U.S.	
110	Win	77–19–14	Pedro Campo	PTS	6	Feb 4, 1924	23 years, 189 days	Broadway Auditorium, Buffalo, New York, U.S.	
109	Win	76–19–14	Johnny Darcy	NWS	12	Jan 29, 1924	23 years, 183 days	Stadium A.C., Jersey City, New Jersey, U.S.	
108	Win	75–19–14	Sammy Vogel	PTS	12	Dec 4, 1923	23 years, 127 days	Pioneer Sporting Club, New York City, New York, U.S.	
107	Loss	74–19–14	Teddy Meyers	PTS	12	Nov 29, 1923	23 years, 122 days	Broadway Auditorium, Buffalo, New York, U.S.	
106	Win	74–18–14	Benny Cohen	NWS	12	Nov 1, 1923	23 years, 94 days	Laurel Garden, Newark, New Jersey, U.S.	
105	Draw	73–18–14	Chubby Brown	NWS	10	Oct 17, 1923	23 years, 79 days	South Main Street Armory, Wilkes-Barre, Pennsylvania, U.S.	
104	Loss	73–18–13	Louis "Kid" Kaplan	PTS	10	Sep 28, 1923	23 years, 60 days	Madison Square Garden, New York City, New York, U.S.	
103	Win	73–17–13	Alex Hart	PTS	15	Sep 18, 1923	23 years, 50 days	Pioneer Sporting Club, New York City, New York, U.S.	
102	Win	72–17–13	Pal Moran	PTS	10	Sep 4, 1923	23 years, 36 days	Queensboro Stadium, New York City, New York, U.S.	
101	Win	71–17–13	Tommy Noble	PTS	12	Jul 25, 1923	22 years, 360 days	Johnson Field, Johnson City, New York, U.S.	
100	Loss	70–17–13	Benny Valger	NWS	10	Jul 9, 1923	22 years, 344 days	Town Hall, Scranton, Pennsylvania, U.S.	
99	Win	70–16–13	Phil Logan	PTS	12	Jun 22, 1923	22 years, 327 days	Johnson Field, Johnson City, New York, U.S.	
98	Draw	69–16–13	Willie Herman	PTS	10	Apr 23, 1923	22 years, 267 days	Broadway Auditorium, Buffalo, New York, U.S.	
97	Draw	69–16–12	Benny Valger	MD	12	Apr 9, 1923	22 years, 253 days	Broadway Auditorium, Buffalo, New York, U.S.	
96	Win	69–16–11	Pedro Campo	NWS	10	Apr 3, 1923	22 years, 247 days	109th Infantry Armory, Scranton, Pennsylvania, U.S.	
95	Win	68–16–11	Frankie Callahan	PTS	10	Apr 2, 1923	22 years, 246 days	Broadway Auditorium, Buffalo, New York, U.S.	
94	Win	67–16–11	Chubby Brown	UD	12	Mar 12, 1923	22 years, 225 days	Convention Hall, Rochester, New York, U.S.	
93	Win	66–16–11	Teddy Meyers	PTS	10	Mar 5, 1923	22 years, 218 days	Broadway Auditorium, Buffalo, New York, U.S.	Won inaugural Buffalo junior lightweight title
92	Win	65–16–11	Pep O'Brien	NWS	10	Mar 1, 1923	22 years, 214 days	Town Hall, Scranton, Pennsylvania, U.S.	
91	Loss	64–16–11	Sid Barbarian	NWS	10	Feb 12, 1923	22 years, 197 days	Danceland Arena, Detroit, Michigan, U.S.	
90	Draw	64–15–11	Teddy Meyers	PTS	10	Feb 5, 1923	22 years, 190 days	Broadway Auditorium, Buffalo, New York, U.S.	
89	Win	64–15–10	Sammy Berne	PTS	10	Jan 15, 1923	22 years, 159 days	Broadway Auditorium, Buffalo, New York, U.S.	
88	Loss	63–15–10	Billy DeFoe	NWS	10	Dec 28, 1922	22 years, 151 days	Town Hall, Scranton, Pennsylvania, U.S.	
87	Win	63–14–10	Tommy Noble	PTS	10	Dec 23, 1922	22 years, 146 days	Grand Opera House, Hamilton, Ontario, Canada	
86	Loss	62–14–10	Billy DeFoe	NWS	10	Dec 8, 1922	22 years, 131 days	Town Hall, Scranton, Pennsylvania, U.S.	
85	Win	62–13–10	Red Cap Wilson	PTS	6	Nov 1, 1922	22 years, 94 days	Madison Square Garden, New York City, New York, U.S.	
84	Loss	61–13–10	Charlie O'Connell	PTS	10	Oct 9, 1922	22 years, 71 days	Broadway Auditorium, Buffalo, New York, U.S.	
83	Loss	61–12–10	Charlie O'Connell	NWS	10	Sep 4, 1922	22 years, 36 days	Erie, Pennsylvania, U.S.	
82	Win	61–11–10	Mixer Mitchell	PTS	10	Aug 9, 1922	22 years, 10 days	Broadway Auditorium, Buffalo, New York, U.S.	
81	Win	60–11–10	Tommy Noble	PTS	10	Jul 17, 1922	21 years, 352 days	Broadway Auditorium, Buffalo, New York, U.S.	
80	Loss	59–11–10	Tommy Noble	PTS	10	Jun 9, 1922	21 years, 314 days	Civic Arena, Toronto, Ontario, Canada	
79	Draw	59–10–10	Tommy Noble	PTS	10	May 24, 1922	21 years, 298 days	Civic Arena, Toronto, Ontario, Canada	
78	Win	59–10–9	Dick Conlon	NWS	10	May 19, 1922	21 years, 293 days	Erie, Pennsylvania, U.S.	
77	Loss	58–10–9	Al Murphy	NWS	10	May 8, 1922	21 years, 282 days	Athletic Park, Scranton, Pennsylvania, U.S.	
76	Win	58–9–9	Rube Cohen	KO	5 (10)	May 1, 1922	21 years, 275 days	Broadway Auditorium, Buffalo, New York, U.S.	
75	Loss	57–9–9	Johnny Dundee	SD	10	Apr 4, 1922	21 years, 248 days	Civic Arena, Toronto, Ontario, Canada	
74	Win	57–8–9	Freddie Jacks	SD	10	Feb 24, 1922	21 years, 209 days	Civic Arena, Toronto, Ontario, Canada	
73	Win	56–8–9	Bobby Michaels	DQ	1 (10)	Feb 13, 1922	21 years, 198 days	Broadway Auditorium, Buffalo, New York, U.S.	Low blow
72	Win	55–8–9	Mixer Mitchell	PTS	15	Feb 3, 1922	21 years, 188 days	Arena, Syracuse, New York, U.S.	
71	Win	54–8–9	Danny Grieves	KO	5 (10)	Jan 19, 1922	21 years, 173 days	Town Hall, Scranton, Pennsylvania, U.S.	
70	Win	53–8–9	Young Henny	PTS	12	Dec 16, 1921	21 years, 139 days	Arena, Syracuse, New York, U.S.	
69	Win	52–8–9	Red Mack	PTS	12	Dec 5, 1921	21 years, 128 days	Arena, Syracuse, New York, U.S.	
68	Win	51–8–9	Freddie Jacks	PTS	12	Nov 24, 1921	21 years, 117 days	Arena, Syracuse, New York, U.S.	
67	Win	50–8–9	Battling Johnson	PTS	10	Nov 11, 1921	21 years, 104 days	Arena, Syracuse, New York, U.S.	
66	Win	49–8–9	Fritz Meiler	UD	10	Sep 26, 1921	21 years, 58 days	Broadway Auditorium, Buffalo, New York, U.S.	
65	Loss	48–8–9	Chubby Brown	SD	10	Aug 29, 1921	21 years, 30 days	Convention Hall, Rochester, New York, U.S.	
64	Draw	48–7–9	Teddy Meyers	PTS	10	Aug 19, 1921	21 years, 20 days	Bison Stadium, Buffalo, New York, U.S.	
63	Win	48–7–8	Johnny Rose	PTS	10	Aug 4, 1921	21 years, 5 days	Celeron Ball Park, Jamestown, New York, U.S.	
62	Win	47–7–8	Herman Smith	MD	10	Jun 27, 1921	20 years, 332 days	Broadway Auditorium, Buffalo, New York, U.S.	
61	Win	46–7–8	Phil Logan	PTS	15	Jun 10, 1921	20 years, 315 days	Bison Stadium, Buffalo, New York, U.S.	
60	Win	45–7–8	Chubby Brown	PTS	12	May 2, 1921	20 years, 276 days	Convention Hall, Rochester, New York, U.S.	
59	Win	44–7–8	Phil Logan	PTS	12	Apr 21, 1921	20 years, 265 days	Broadway Auditorium, Buffalo, New York, U.S.	
58	Win	43–7–8	Joe Jawson	PTS	10	Feb 21, 1921	20 years, 206 days	The Armouries, Toronto, Ontario, Canada	
57	Win	42–7–8	Harry Bingham	PTS	10	Feb 18, 1921	20 years, 203 days	Hamilton, Ontario, Canada	
56	Win	41–7–8	Joe Reno	PTS	15	Jan 8, 1921	21 years, 150 days	Broadway Auditorium, Buffalo, New York, U.S.	
55	Win	40–7–8	Jesse Morey	TKO	8 (10)	Dec 27, 1920	20 years, 150 days	Broadway Auditorium, Buffalo, New York, U.S.	
54	Win	39–7–8	Nick Michaels	PTS	10	Dec 13, 1920	20 years, 136 days	Broadway Auditorium, Buffalo, New York, U.S.	
53	Win	38–7–8	Chip Davis	UD	10	Dec 6, 1920	20 years, 129 days	Broadway Auditorium, Buffalo, New York, U.S.	
52	Draw	37–7–8	Augustine "Bud" Christiano	PTS	12	Oct 11, 1920	20 years, 73 days	Bison Stadium, Buffalo, New York, U.S.	
51	Win	37–7–7	Danny Dillon	NWS	10	Aug 24, 1920	20 years, 20 days	Bison Stadium, Buffalo, New York, U.S.	
50	Draw	36–7–7	Eddie Walsh	NWS	10	Aug 19, 1920	20 years, 20 days	Athletic Park, Scranton, Pennsylvania, U.S.	
49	Loss	36–7–6	Augustine "Bud" Christiano	NWS	10	Aug 18, 1920	20 years, 19 days	Velodrome Park, Buffalo, New York, U.S.	
48	Loss	36–6–6	Augustine "Bud" Christiano	NWS	10	Aug 4, 1920	20 years, 5 days	Velodrome Park, Buffalo, New York, U.S.	
47	Win	36–5–6	Herman Smith	NWS	10	Jun 7, 1920	19 years, 313 days	Broadway Auditorium, Buffalo, New York, U.S.	
46	Loss	35–5–6	Benny Valger	NWS	10	May 10, 1920	19 years, 285 days	Broadway Auditorium, Buffalo, New York, U.S.	
45	Win	35–4–6	Teddy Meyers	NWS	10	May 3, 1920	19 years, 278 days	Broadway Auditorium, Buffalo, New York, U.S.	
44	Win	34–4–6	Dick Atkins	PTS	10	Apr 21, 1920	19 years, 266 days	Grand Opera House, Hamilton, Ontario, Canada	
43	Win	33–4–6	Harry Bingham	PTS	6	Apr 9, 1920	19 years, 254 days	Grand Opera House, Hamilton, Ontario, Canada	
42	Win	32–4–6	Chick Rodgers	NWS	10	Mar 25, 1920	19 years, 239 days	Broadway Auditorium, Buffalo, New York, U.S.	
41	Draw	31–4–6	Dick Loadman	NWS	10	Mar 12, 1920	19 years, 226 days	Broadway Auditorium, Buffalo, New York, U.S.	
40	Win	31–4–5	Phil Logan	NWS	10	Mar 8, 1920	19 years, 222 days	Broadway Auditorium, Buffalo, New York, U.S.	
39	Win	30–4–5	Chip Davis	NWS	10	Feb 27, 1920	19 years, 212 days	Broadway Auditorium, Buffalo, New York, U.S.	
38	Win	29–4–5	Young Joey Mendo	NWS	10	Feb 23, 1920	19 years, 208 days	Broadway Auditorium, Buffalo, New York, U.S.	
37	Win	28–4–5	Scotty Lisner	PTS	10	Jan 30, 1920	19 years, 184 days	Massey Hall, Toronto, Ontario, Canada	
36	Win	27–4–5	Teddy Meyers	NWS	10	Jan 1, 1920	19 years, 155 days	Broadway Auditorium, Buffalo, New York, U.S.	
35	Win	26–4–5	Johnny Dwyer	TKO	5 (10)	Dec 16, 1919	19 years, 139 days	Broadway Auditorium, Buffalo, New York, U.S.	
34	Loss	25–4–5	Al Kale	NWS	6	Dec 12, 1919	19 years, 135 days	Maltosia Hall, Buffalo, New York, U.S.	
33	Win	25–3–5	Scotty Lisner	PTS	10	Nov 27, 1919	19 years, 120 days	Massey Hall, Toronto, Ontario, Canada	
32	Win	24–3–5	Johnny McCoy	NWS	6	Nov 25, 1919	19 years, 118 days	Miller's Hall, Buffalo, New York, U.S.	
31	Draw	23–3–5	Dick Atkins	PTS	10	Nov 21, 1919	19 years, 114 days	Hamilton, Ontario, Canada	
30	Win	23–3–4	Chip Davis	NWS	10	Nov 10, 1919	19 years, 103 days	Broadway Auditorium, Buffalo, New York, U.S.	
29	Win	22–3–4	Chip Davis	NWS	6	Oct 30, 1919	19 years, 92 days	Broadway Auditorium, Buffalo, New York, U.S.	
28	Win	21–3–4	Frankie Kirsch	NWS	6	Oct 10, 1919	19 years, 72 days	Broadway Auditorium, Buffalo, New York, U.S.	
27	Win	20–3–4	Bobby Eber	PTS	10	Sep 26, 1919	19 years, 58 days	London, Ontario, Canada	
26	Draw	19–3–4	Dick Atkins	PTS	10	Sep 23, 1919	19 years, 55 days	Hamilton, Ontario, Canada	
25	Loss	19–3–3	Dick Atkins	PTS	10	Sep 19, 1919	19 years, 51 days	Massey Hall, Toronto, Ontario, Canada	
24	Win	19–2–3	Maxie Green	NWS	6	Aug 18, 1919	19 years, 19 days	Bison Stadium, Buffalo, New York, U.S.	
23	Loss	18–2–3	Bobby Eber	PTS	10	Aug 8, 1919	19 years, 9 days	Hamilton, Ontario, Canada	
22	Draw	18–1–3	Dick Atkins	PTS	10	Aug 1, 1919	19 years, 2 days	Island Stadium, Toronto, Ontario, Canada	
21	Win	18–1–2	Dick Atkins	PTS	10	Jul 18, 1919	18 years, 353 days	Island Stadium, Toronto, Ontario, Canada	
20	Win	17–1–2	Cy Martin	NWS	4	Jun 30, 1919	18 years, 335 days	Doll's park, Buffalo, New York, U.S.	
19	Draw	16–1–2	Bobby Eber	PTS	10	Jun 3, 1919	18 years, 308 days	Welland, Ontario, Canada	
18	Loss	16–1–1	Johnny McCoy	NWS	6	May 6, 1919	18 years, 280 days	Broadway Auditorium, Buffalo, New York, U.S.	
17	Win	16–0–1	Willie Duffy	NWS	6	Apr 25, 1919	18 years, 269 days	Auburn, New York, U.S.	
16	Win	15–0–1	Cy Martin	NWS	6	Apr 24, 1919	18 years, 268 days	Olean, New York, U.S.	
15	Win	14–0–1	Irish Kennedy	NWS	6	Apr 14, 1919	18 years, 258 days	Broadway Auditorium, Buffalo, New York, U.S.	
14	Win	13–0–1	Herman Smith	NWS	6	Apr 8, 1919	18 years, 252 days	Broadway Auditorium, Buffalo, New York, U.S.	
13	Win	12–0–1	Bobby Eber	NWS	6	Apr 4, 1919	18 years, 248 days	Superior A.C., Buffalo, New York, U.S.	
12	Win	11–0–1	Johnny Dunn	NWS	6	Mar 21, 1919	18 years, 234 days	Superior A.C., Buffalo, New York, U.S.	
11	Win	10–0–1	Cy Martin	NWS	6	Mar 17, 1919	18 years, 230 days	Broadway Auditorium, Buffalo, New York, U.S.	
10	Draw	9–0–1	Eddie Harling	NWS	6	Mar 10, 1919	18 years, 223 days	Broadway Auditorium, Buffalo, New York, U.S.	
9	Win	9–0	George Ranney	NWS	4	Dec 30, 1918	18 years, 153 days	Broadway Auditorium, Buffalo, New York, U.S.	
8	Win	8–0	Battling Leonard	NWS	4	Dec 17, 1918	18 years, 140 days	Broadway Auditorium, Buffalo, New York, U.S.	
7	Win	7–0	Joe Marcus	NWS	4	Jun 24, 1918	17 years, 329 days	Broadway Auditorium, Buffalo, New York, U.S.	
6	Win	6–0	Art Madden	KO	3 (4)	May 9, 1918	17 years, 283 days	Eagles Hall, Buffalo, New York, U.S.	
5	Win	5–0	Cutie Kaufman	KO	3 (4)	May 3, 1918	17 years, 277 days	Broadway Auditorium, Buffalo, New York, U.S.	
4	Win	4–0	Cutie Kaufman	NWS	4	Apr 12, 1918	17 years, 256 days	St. Patrick's A.C., Buffalo, New York, U.S.	
3	Win	3–0	Chip Davis	NWS	4	Mar 22, 1918	17 years, 215 days	Broadway Auditorium, Buffalo, New York, U.S.	
2	Win	2–0	Battling Leonard	NWS	4	Feb 26, 1918	17 years, 211 days	Broadway Auditorium, Buffalo, New York, U.S.	
1	Win	1–0	Battling Leonard	KO	1 (4)	Feb 6, 1918	17 years, 191 days	St. Mary's Catholic Club, Buffalo, New York, U.S.	

== Titles in boxing ==
=== Major world titles ===
- NYSAC lightweight champion (135 lbs)
- NBA (WBA) lightweight champion (135 lbs)

=== The Ring magazine titles ===
- The Ring lightweight champion (135 lbs)

=== Regional/International titles ===
- Buffalo super featherweight champion (130 lbs)

=== Undisputed titles ===
- Undisputed lightweight champion

== See also ==
- Lineal championship

Achievements
Preceded by Benny Leonard	World Lightweight Champion; July 13, 1925 – December 7, 1925	Succeeded by Rocky Kansas
