= Sid Terris =

American boxer (1904–1974)

Personal information
- Nicknames: Galloping Ghost of the Ghetto; Dancing Master of the East Side
- Nationality: American
- Born: Sydney Terris; September 27, 1904 New York, lower East Side
- Died: 30 December 1974 (aged 70) Miami Beach, Florida
- Height: 5 ft 10 in (1.78 m)
- Weight: Lightweight

Boxing career
- Stance: Orthodox

Boxing record
- Wins: 99
- Win by KO: 12
- Losses: 13
- Draws: 5
- No contests: 1

Sidney Terris (September 27, 1904 – December 30, 1974) was a top rated American lightweight boxing contender from the Lower East Side of Manhattan. He excelled as an amateur, winning fifty straight bouts and taking Metropolitan, New York State, National AAU, and both National and International titles.

At the end of 1924, Tex Rickard and Stanley Uese Wills, Dempsey's managers, rated Terris second behind only champion Benny Leonard. A world ranked lightweight from February 1925 until November 1929, his highest ranking was # 1. On February 6, 1925, he lost to Sammy Mandell in an elimination bout for the World Lightweight Championship.

== Early life ==
Terris was born one of five children on September 27, 1904 on Clinton Street on the Lower East Side of Manhattan to Fred and Gussie Terris. His father died when he was only eight, leaving his single mother to bring up the large family. An early coach, Dan Caplin recognized his skilled footwork, and had Terris learning to box by age thirteen. Boxing as an amateur, Terris was a prodigy from an early age, winning fifty bouts in a row, and accumulating titles that included the Metropolitan Amateur, New York State Amateur, and both National and International Amateur titles.

== Early boxing career ==
Terris turned pro in 1922 at the age of eighteen, winning eighteen of nineteen fights that year. Author Ken Blady noted that Terris's greatest strength, his early speed and constant footwork in the ring, could also be a detriment against more skilled opponents, as it exhausted him and made him less of a threat near the end of his fights.

In his first years as a pro, and not yet nineteen, Terris beat exceptional boxer Eddie "Kid" Wagner in a ten-round points decision at the Henderson Bowl in Brooklyn on June 3, 1924 after a previous six round loss.

Terris had a few exceptional wins by knockout as a young pro. He was the first boxer to get a full count from Andy Chaney winning in a third-round knockout at the Henderson Bowl in Brooklyn on May 23, 1924, as well as winning with a seventh-round knockout of Johnny Lisse on January 21, 1924 at the Lenox Athletic Club in New York. Chaney, in over 130 fights, had never been knocked out. Impressively, Terris fought Sammy Mandell, 1926-30 Lightweight Boxing Champion, to a ten-round draw at Madison Square Garden on December 17, 1923. One source noted that Terris's greatest bout in 1924, was a decisive win against French born Jewish boxing great Benny Valgar, in a ten-round decision at the Nostrand Athletic Club in Brooklyn.

== Boxing peak and mid-career ==
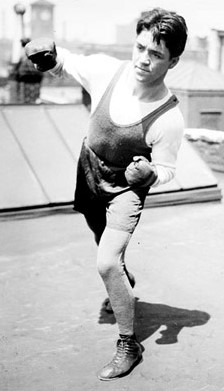
Sammy Mandell World Lightweight Champion July, 1926-July 1930

Boxing author Ken Blady believes Terris's best year as a boxer was 1925, when he lost only one of his eighteen major bouts. Unfortunately the loss was in a sanctioned twelve round World Lightweight elimination contest with future reigning Lightweight champion Sammy Mandell on February 6, 1925 in Madison Square Garden. This exceptional bout drew 13,000 fans. It was, in many ways a very close contest. Terris knocked Mandell to the mat for a nine count in the third round with a strong blow. Mandell, however, evaded Terris for the remaining rounds, and with greater energy and speed, somehow won the bout on points by unanimous decision.

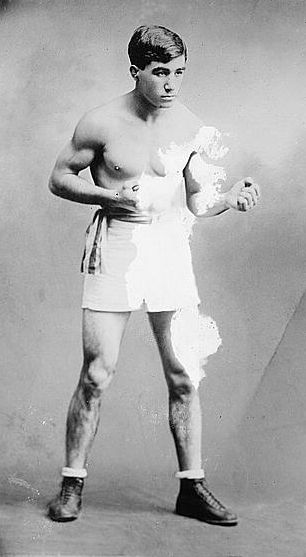
Johnny Dundee, 1924 Jr. Light and Featherweight Champ

His wins over Jimmy Goodrich in January and Pal Moran in March 1925, helped keep him highly rated in his division.

From 1925 to 1927, Terris had an exceptional run and defeated boxing greats Jack Bernstein and Johnny Dundee twice each. Dundee was formerly both Jr. Lightweight and Featherweight World Champion. Bernstein held the Jr. Lightweight championship as late as June 20, 1924. Terris won every round in his victory over Dundee on May 4, 1925 in Madison Square Garden. His July 10, 1925 victory over Ace Hudkins was also impressive, showing an exceptional defense.

== Temporary boxing retirement and slow decline ==
Perhaps because Terris went into temporary retirement in 1926 for eight months, his chances at a second title shot began to slowly diminish. Taking up boxing again in 1927, he beat Billy Wallace, and followed with victories over Babe Herman, boxing great Ruby Goldstein, and Phil McGraw. For some reason, his managers were unable to again secure a Lightweight Title shot. At only 23 in early 1928, Terris was the victim of knockouts from the great Jimmy McLarnin, Ray Miller, and on January 28, 1929 from Babe Herman, speeding the end of his career. According to boxing writer Bert Sugar, even in his devastating first round loss to McLarnin on February 24, 1928 in Madison Square Garden, Terris was still getting in jabs and "boxing beautifully" shortly before being knocked to the canvas for the count.

Terris, defeated Phil McGraw on August 24, 1927, showing incredible pluck. The Sarasota Herald-Tribune, wrote "Sid Terris, New York contender for the lightweight championship won a decision from Phil McGraw of Detroit in their ten round contest at Ebbets Field, Brooklyn, tonight." He somehow performed this feat after "a sensational first round in which he was knocked down three times, once for the count of nine."

As early as 1928, the Milwaukee Journal, wrote that "It begins to look as though Sid Terris, once regarded as the uncrowned Lightweight Champion of the World, has reached the end of his fistic string." The article lamented his one-round knockout from Ray Miller of Chicago on July 6, 1928 in Coney Island. But more tellingly, the article went on to note, "the Ghetto Ghost (Terris) was one of the fastest and cleverest lightweights. He fought the best there was in the division and lost few decisions." The article also noted that in Terris's only lightweight title fight that "Mandell eked out a hairline decision at a great 15 round match at New York." It also noted Terris's stunning amateur record of winning "fifty straight bouts."

== Retirement from boxing and later life ==
Terris continued to fight after his devastating first round loss to Jimmy McLarnin on February 24, 1928 at Madison Square Garden, but the quality of his competition faded, as did the size of his audience. He lost as many as half of his contests from 1928 through his last bout with Johnny Gaito on May 7, 1931 in Columbus Hall in Yonkers.

In retirement in 1931, Terris worked many years as a maître d' at Stampler's Restaurant in Manhattan. He retired to Miami Beach with his family and died on December 30, 1974.

He was posthumously inducted into the International Boxing Hall of Fame in 2018 as the inductee in the Early Era division (1893-1943).

== Professional boxing record ==
All information in this section is derived from BoxRec, unless otherwise stated.

=== Official record ===
112 fights	88 wins	13 losses
By knockout	12	5
By decision	73	7
By disqualification	3	1
Draws	4	
Newspaper decisions/draws	7	

All newspaper decisions are officially regarded as “no decision” bouts and are not counted in the win/loss/draw column.

No.	Result	Record	Opponent	Type	Round, time	Date	Location	Notes
112	Loss	88–13–4 (7)	Johnny Gaito	PTS	6	May 7, 1931	Columbus Hall, Yonkers, New York, US	
111	Draw	88–12–4 (7)	Teddy Watson	PTS	10	Mar 4, 1931	Hollywood Arena, Jersey City, New Jersey, US	
110	Loss	88–12–3 (7)	Pete Nebo	PTS	10	Jul 8, 1930	Queensboro Stadium, New York City, New York, US	
109	Loss	88–11–3 (7)	Pete Nebo	PTS	10	Jun 4, 1930	Ebbets Field, New York City, New York, US	
108	Win	88–10–3 (7)	Harry Scott	KO	4 (10)	May 17, 1930	Olympia Boxing Club, New York City, New York, US	
107	Win	87–10–3 (7)	Gaston Charles	UD	10	Feb 18, 1930	Broadway Arena, New York City, New York, US	
106	Loss	86–10–3 (7)	Stanislaus Loayza	PTS	10	Oct 3, 1929	Madison Square Garden, New York City, New York, US	
105	Draw	86–9–3 (7)	Pete Nebo	PTS	10	Sep 3, 1929	Queensboro Stadium, New York City, New York, US	
104	Win	86–9–2 (7)	Emory Cabana	PTS	10	Aug 9, 1929	Coney Island Stadium, New York City, New York, US	
103	Win	85–9–2 (7)	Georgie Balduc	PTS	10	Jul 23, 1929	Dexter Park Arena, New York City, New York, US	
102	Win	84–9–2 (7)	Joey Abrams	PTS	10	Jul 8, 1929	American Legion Arena, West Springfield, Massachusetts, US	
101	Loss	83–9–2 (7)	Babe Herman	KO	6 (10), 0:22	Jan 28, 1929	St. Nicholas Arena, New York City, New York, US	
100	Win	83–8–2 (7)	Jackie Pilkington	PTS	10	Jan 7, 1929	St. Nicholas Arena, New York City, New York, US	
99	Win	82–8–2 (7)	Phil McGraw	DQ	6 (?)	Sep 21, 1928	Coney Island Stadium, New York City, New York, US	
98	Loss	81–8–2 (7)	Ray Miller	KO	1 (10)	Jul 6, 1928	Coney Island Stadium, New York City, New York, US	
97	Win	81–7–2 (7)	Eddie Mack	PTS	10	May 15, 1928	Stockyards Stadium, Denver, Colorado, US	
96	Loss	80–7–2 (7)	Jimmy McLarnin	KO	1 (10), 1:47	Feb 24, 1928	Madison Square Garden, New York City, New York, US	
95	Win	80–6–2 (7)	Phil McGraw	PTS	10	Dec 23, 1927	Madison Square Garden, New York City, New York, US	
94	Loss	79–6–2 (7)	Phil McGraw	DQ	2 (10)	Oct 6, 1927	Ebbets Field, New York City, New York, US	Terris was DQ'd for a low blow
93	Loss	79–5–2 (7)	Hilario Martinez	PTS	10	Sep 29, 1927	Queensboro Stadium, New York City, New York, US	
92	Win	79–4–2 (7)	Phil McGraw	SD	10	Aug 24, 1927	Ebbets Field, New York City, New York, US	
91	Win	78–4–2 (7)	Ruby Goldstein	KO	1 (6), 1:47	Jun 15, 1927	Polo Grounds, New York City, New York, US	
90	Win	77–4–2 (7)	Stanislaus Loayza	PTS	10	May 13, 1927	Madison Square Garden, New York City, New York, US	
89	Win	76–4–2 (7)	Babe Herman	KO	3 (12)	Apr 12, 1927	Public Hall, Cleveland, Ohio, US	
88	Win	75–4–2 (7)	Billy Wallace	PTS	10	Mar 18, 1927	Madison Square Garden, New York City, New York, US	
87	Win	74–4–2 (7)	Billy White	UD	10	Feb 8, 1927	Pioneer Sporting Club, New York City, New York, US	
86	Win	73–4–2 (7)	Babe Ruth	PTS	10	Jan 29, 1927	Ridgewood Grove, New York City, New York, US	Not to be confused with Babe Ruth
85	Win	72–4–2 (7)	Ray Mitchell	UD	10	Jan 17, 1927	Broadway Arena, New York City, New York, US	
84	Win	71–4–2 (7)	Billy Petrolle	UD	10	Jun 11, 1926	Coney Island Stadium, New York City, New York, US	
83	Draw	70–4–2 (7)	Harry Cook	PTS	10	Mar 22, 1926	Broadway Auditorium, Buffalo, New York, US	
82	Win	70–4–1 (7)	Luke Carr	KO	5 (10)	Feb 1, 1926	Broadway Auditorium, Buffalo, New York, US	
81	Win	69–4–1 (7)	Lucien Vinez	PTS	10	Jan 8, 1926	Madison Square Garden, New York City, New York, US	
80	Win	68–4–1 (7)	Basil Galiano	NWS	10	Nov 3, 1925	Coliseum, Saint Louis, Missouri, US	
79	Win	68–4–1 (6)	Jack Bernstein	PTS	10	Oct 12, 1925	Polo Grounds, New York City, New York, US	
78	Win	67–4–1 (6)	Harry 'Kid' Brown	PTS	10	Sep 24, 1925	Shibe Park, Philadelphia, Pennsylvania, US	
77	Win	66–4–1 (6)	Jack Bernstein	PTS	12	Aug 31, 1925	Queensboro Stadium, New York City, New York, US	
76	Win	65–4–1 (6)	Jimmy Marino	KO	2 (8)	Aug 12, 1925	Airport, Atlantic City, New Jersey, US	
75	Win	64–4–1 (6)	Basil Galiano	PTS	12	Aug 4, 1925	Coney Island Stadium, New York City, New York, US	
74	Win	63–4–1 (6)	Charlie O'Connell	PTS	10	Jul 27, 1925	Queensboro Stadium, New York City, New York, US	
73	Win	62–4–1 (6)	Ace Hudkins	NWS	10	Jul 10, 1925	East Chicago, Indiana, US	
72	Win	62–4–1 (5)	Pal Moran	PTS	10	Jun 18, 1925	Dexter Park Stadium, New York City, New York, US	
71	Win	61–4–1 (5)	Johnny Dundee	PTS	15	Jun 12, 1925	Coney Island Stadium, New York City, New York, US	
70	Win	60–4–1 (5)	Lou Paluso	PTS	10	May 26, 1925	Queensboro Stadium, New York City, New York, US	
69	Win	59–4–1 (5)	Johnny Dundee	PTS	12	May 5, 1925	Madison Square Garden, New York City, New York, US	
68	Win	58–4–1 (5)	Rocky Kansas	DQ	5 (10)	Apr 27, 1925	Broadway Auditorium, Buffalo, New York, US	
67	Win	57–4–1 (5)	Lou Paluso	PTS	10	Mar 25, 1925	Manhattan Casino, New York City, New York, US	
66	Win	56–4–1 (5)	Pal Moran	NWS	12	Mar 2, 1925	Laurel Garden, Newark, New Jersey, US	
65	Loss	56–4–1 (4)	Sammy Mandell	PTS	12	Feb 6, 1925	Madison Square Garden, New York City, New York, US	
64	Win	56–3–1 (4)	Joe Hall	PTS	6	Jan 21, 1925	Broadway Auditorium, Buffalo, New York, US	
63	Win	55–3–1 (4)	Jimmy Goodrich	PTS	12	Jan 13, 1925	Pioneer Sporting Club, New York City, New York, US	
62	Win	54–3–1 (4)	Whitey Fitzgerald	PTS	10	Dec 15, 1924	Arena, Philadelphia, Pennsylvania, US	
61	Win	53–3–1 (4)	Luis Vicentini	PTS	12	Nov 26, 1924	Madison Square Garden, New York City, New York, US	
60	Win	52–3–1 (4)	Mel Coogan	KO	6 (12), 1:21	Nov 13, 1924	Clermont Avenue Rink, New York City, New York, US	
59	Win	51–3–1 (4)	Benny Valgar	PTS	10	Aug 19, 1924	Henderson's Bowl, New York City, New York, US	
58	Win	50–3–1 (4)	Jimmy Mars	DQ	7 (10)	Aug 8, 1924	Arena, Rockaway Beach, New York City, New York, US	
57	Win	49–3–1 (4)	Paul Fritsch	UD	10	Jul 1, 1924	Henderson's Bowl, New York City, New York, US	
56	Win	48–3–1 (4)	Al Shubert	PTS	10	Jun 20, 1924	Henderson's Bowl, New York City, New York, US	
55	Win	47–3–1 (4)	Eddie Wagner	PTS	12	Jun 3, 1924	Henderson's Bowl, New York City, New York, US	
54	Win	46–3–1 (4)	Andy Chaney	TKO	3 (10), 2:18	May 23, 1924	Henderson's Bowl, New York City, New York, US	
53	Win	45–3–1 (4)	Earl Baird	PTS	10	May 1, 1924	Rink S.C., New York City, New York, US	
52	Win	44–3–1 (4)	Sid Bernard	PTS	12	Apr 10, 1924	Rink S.C., New York City, New York, US	
51	Win	43–3–1 (4)	Phil Logan	PTS	10	Apr 2, 1924	Pioneer Sporting Club, New York City, New York, US	
50	Win	42–3–1 (4)	Eddie Brady	PTS	10	Mar 18, 1924	Pioneer Sporting Club, New York City, New York, US	
49	Win	41–3–1 (4)	Billy Henry	PTS	10	Feb 25, 1924	Broadway Arena, New York City, New York, US	
48	Win	40–3–1 (4)	Jack Hausner	PTS	10	Feb 7, 1924	Clermont Avenue Rink, New York City, New York, US	
47	Win	39–3–1 (4)	Johnny Lisse	KO	7 (12)	Jan 21, 1924	Lenox A.C., New York City, New York, US	
46	Loss	38–3–1 (4)	Eddie Wagner	KO	6 (12), 2:48	Jan 4, 1924	Madison Square Garden, New York City, New York, US	
45	Draw	38–2–1 (4)	Sammy Mandell	PTS	10	Dec 17, 1923	Madison Square Garden, New York City, New York, US	
44	Win	38–2 (4)	Dutch Brandt	PTS	12	Nov 29, 1923	Rink S.C., New York City, New York, US	
43	Win	37–2 (4)	Bud Dempsey	PTS	12	Nov 19, 1923	Lenox A.C., New York City, New York, US	
42	Win	36–2 (4)	Johnny Cooney	PTS	10	Oct 23, 1923	Pioneer Sporting Club, New York City, New York, US	
41	Win	35–2 (4)	Joey Baker	PTS	6	Oct 4, 1923	Clermont Avenue Rink, New York City, New York, US	
40	Win	34–2 (4)	Frankie Rice	NWS	10	Sep 17, 1923	Convention Hall, Lancaster, Pennsylvania, US	
39	Win	34–2 (3)	Jack Stark	PTS	6	Sep 12, 1923	Velodrome, New York City, New York, US	
38	Win	33–2 (3)	Larry Roach	PTS	6	Sep 7, 1923	Steeplechase A.A., New York City, New York, US	
37	Draw	32–2 (3)	Cuddy DeMarco	NWS	8	Sep 3, 1923	Waltz Dream Arena, Atlantic City, New Jersey, US	
36	Win	32–2 (2)	Rosey Stoy	NWS	8	Aug 20, 1923	Bacharach Ball Park, Atlantic City, New Jersey, US	
35	Win	32–2 (1)	Tony Vaccarelli	PTS	6	Aug 17, 1923	Steeplechase A.A., New York City, New York, US	
34	Win	31–2 (1)	Tony Palmer	PTS	6	Aug 9, 1923	Velodrome, New York City, New York, US	
33	Win	30–2 (1)	Joe Ritchie	NWS	8	Aug 6, 1923	Bacharach Ball Park, Atlantic City, New Jersey, US	
32	Loss	30–2	Earl Baird	PTS	6	Jul 14, 1923	Ridgewood Grove, New York City, New York, US	
31	Win	30–1	Ray Lucas	TKO	4 (6)	Jun 20, 1923	Broadway Arena, New York City, New York, US	
30	Win	29–1	Joey Silvers	PTS	6	Jun 13, 1923	Coney Island Velodrome, New York City, New York, US	
29	Win	28–1	Otto Goldberg	PTS	4	Jun 6, 1923	Commonwealth Sporting Club, New York City, New York, US	
28	Win	27–1	Frankie Sinclair	PTS	6	May 28, 1923	Fairmont AC, New York City, New York, US	
27	Win	26–1	Emanuel Lema	PTS	6	May 21, 1923	Broadway Arena, New York City, New York, US	
26	Win	25–1	Moe Ginsberg	PTS	6	May 12, 1923	Commonwealth Sporting Club, New York City, New York, US	
25	Win	24–1	Johnny Gunning	KO	3 (6)	Apr 30, 1923	Harlem-Fairmont AC, New York City, New York, US	
24	Win	23–1	Joey Silvers	PTS	6	Apr 16, 1923	Harlem-Fairmont AC, New York City, New York, US	
23	Win	22–1	Joey Silvers	PTS	6	Mar 19, 1923	Harlem-Fairmont AC, New York City, New York, US	
22	Win	21–1	Jimmy Joyce	PTS	6	Feb 21, 1923	Nashville, Tennessee, US	
21	Win	20–1	Tony Palmer	PTS	6	Feb 10, 1923	Clermont Avenue Rink, New York City, New York, US	
20	Win	19–1	Al Ketchell	PTS	6	Feb 6, 1923	Harlem-Fairmont AC, New York City, New York, US	
19	Win	18–1	Ray Scharra	KO	2 (4)	Feb 1, 1923	Commonwealth Sporting Club, New York City, New York, US	
18	Win	17–1	Tony Palmer	PTS	4	Jan 20, 1923	Rink SC, New York City, New York, US	
17	Win	16–1	Jackie Harris	PTS	4	Jan 17, 1923	Madison Square Garden, New York City, New York, US	
16	Win	15–1	Jackie Mellman	PTS	6	Jan 3, 1923	Harlem-Fairmont AC, New York City, New York, US	
15	Win	14–1	Tommy Hayes	KO	4 (6)	Dec 30, 1922	Clermont Avenue Rink, New York City, New York, US	
14	Win	13–1	Jimmy Joyce	PTS	6	Dec 18, 1922	Harlem-Fairmont AC, New York City, New York, US	
13	Win	12–1	Charley Hayes	PTS	6	Nov 27, 1922	Harlem-Fairmont AC, New York City, New York, US	
12	Win	11–1	Harry Mulcahy	PTS	6	Nov 13, 1922	Broadway Arena, New York City, New York, US	
11	Win	10–1	Willie Garber	PTS	6	Nov 3, 1922	Clermont Avenue Rink, New York City, New York, US	
10	Win	9–1	Lou Paluso	SD	6	Oct 21, 1922	Commonwealth Sporting Club, New York City, New York, US	
9	Win	8–1	Tommy Wilson	PTS	6	Sep 29, 1922	Palace of Joy, New York City, New York, US	
8	Win	7–1	Lou Guglielmini	PTS	4	Sep 11, 1922	NY Velodrome, New York City, New York, US	
7	Win	6–1	Joe Eppy	PTS	6	Aug 14, 1922	Broadway Arena, New York City, New York, US	
6	Win	5–1	Moe Ginsberg	PTS	6	Aug 4, 1922	Palace of Joy, New York City, New York, US	
5	Win	4–1	Willie Garber	PTS	6	Jul 21, 1922	Palace of Joy, New York City, New York, US	
4	Win	3–1	Marty Silvers	PTS	10	Jul 11, 1922	Oakland A.A., Jersey City, New Jersey, US	
3	Win	2–1	Larry Goldberg	PTS	6	Jul 7, 1922	Palace of Joy, New York City, New York, US	
2	Loss	1–1	Joe Ryder	KO	3 (8)	Jun 5, 1922	Broadway Arena, New York City, New York, US	Terris claimed he was hit low
1	Win	1–0	Jimmy Tomasulo	PTS	4	May 29, 1922	Dyckman Oval, New York City, New York, US	

=== Unofficial record ===
112 fights	94 wins	13 losses
By knockout	12	5
By decision	79	7
By disqualification	3	1
Draws	5	

Record with the inclusion of newspaper decisions in the win/loss/draw column.

No.	Result	Record	Opponent	Type	Round, time	Date	Location	Notes
112	Loss	94–13–5	Johnny Gaito	PTS	6	May 7, 1931	Columbus Hall, Yonkers, New York, US	
111	Draw	94–12–5	Teddy Watson	PTS	10	Mar 4, 1931	Hollywood Arena, Jersey City, New Jersey, US	
110	Loss	94–12–4	Pete Nebo	PTS	10	Jul 8, 1930	Queensboro Stadium, New York City, New York, US	
109	Loss	94–11–4	Pete Nebo	PTS	10	Jun 4, 1930	Ebbets Field, New York City, New York, US	
108	Win	94–10–4	Harry Scott	KO	4 (10)	May 17, 1930	Olympia Boxing Club, New York City, New York, US	
107	Win	93–10–4	Gaston Charles	UD	10	Feb 18, 1930	Broadway Arena, New York City, New York, US	
106	Loss	92–10–4	Stanislaus Loayza	PTS	10	Oct 3, 1929	Madison Square Garden, New York City, New York, US	
105	Draw	92–9–4	Pete Nebo	PTS	10	Sep 3, 1929	Queensboro Stadium, New York City, New York, US	
104	Win	92–9–3	Emory Cabana	PTS	10	Aug 9, 1929	Coney Island Stadium, New York City, New York, US	
103	Win	91–9–3	Georgie Balduc	PTS	10	Jul 23, 1929	Dexter Park Arena, New York City, New York, US	
102	Win	90–9–3	Joey Abrams	PTS	10	Jul 8, 1929	American Legion Arena, West Springfield, Massachusetts, US	
101	Loss	89–9–3	Babe Herman	KO	6 (10), 0:22	Jan 28, 1929	St. Nicholas Arena, New York City, New York, US	
100	Win	89–8–3	Jackie Pilkington	PTS	10	Jan 7, 1929	St. Nicholas Arena, New York City, New York, US	
99	Win	88–8–3	Phil McGraw	DQ	6 (?)	Sep 21, 1928	Coney Island Stadium, New York City, New York, US	
98	Loss	87–8–3	Ray Miller	KO	1 (10)	Jul 6, 1928	Coney Island Stadium, New York City, New York, US	
97	Win	87–7–3	Eddie Mack	PTS	10	May 15, 1928	Stockyards Stadium, Denver, Colorado, US	
96	Loss	86–7–3	Jimmy McLarnin	KO	1 (10), 1:47	Feb 24, 1928	Madison Square Garden, New York City, New York, US	
95	Win	86–6–3	Phil McGraw	PTS	10	Dec 23, 1927	Madison Square Garden, New York City, New York, US	
94	Loss	85–6–3	Phil McGraw	DQ	2 (10)	Oct 6, 1927	Ebbets Field, New York City, New York, US	Terris was DQ'd for a low blow
93	Loss	85–5–3	Hilario Martinez	PTS	10	Sep 29, 1927	Queensboro Stadium, New York City, New York, US	
92	Win	85–4–3	Phil McGraw	SD	10	Aug 24, 1927	Ebbets Field, New York City, New York, US	
91	Win	84–4–3	Ruby Goldstein	KO	1 (6), 1:47	Jun 15, 1927	Polo Grounds, New York City, New York, US	
90	Win	83–4–3	Stanislaus Loayza	PTS	10	May 13, 1927	Madison Square Garden, New York City, New York, US	
89	Win	82–4–3	Babe Herman	KO	3 (12)	Apr 12, 1927	Public Hall, Cleveland, Ohio, US	
88	Win	81–4–3	Billy Wallace	PTS	10	Mar 18, 1927	Madison Square Garden, New York City, New York, US	
87	Win	80–4–3	Billy White	UD	10	Feb 8, 1927	Pioneer Sporting Club, New York City, New York, US	
86	Win	79–4–3	Babe Ruth	PTS	10	Jan 29, 1927	Ridgewood Grove, New York City, New York, US	Not to be confused with Babe Ruth
85	Win	78–4–3	Ray Mitchell	UD	10	Jan 17, 1927	Broadway Arena, New York City, New York, US	
84	Win	77–4–3	Billy Petrolle	UD	10	Jun 11, 1926	Coney Island Stadium, New York City, New York, US	
83	Draw	76–4–3	Harry Cook	PTS	10	Mar 22, 1926	Broadway Auditorium, Buffalo, New York, US	
82	Win	76–4–2	Luke Carr	KO	5 (10)	Feb 1, 1926	Broadway Auditorium, Buffalo, New York, US	
81	Win	75–4–2	Lucien Vinez	PTS	10	Jan 8, 1926	Madison Square Garden, New York City, New York, US	
80	Win	74–4–2	Basil Galiano	NWS	10	Nov 3, 1925	Coliseum, Saint Louis, Missouri, US	
79	Win	73–4–2	Jack Bernstein	PTS	10	Oct 12, 1925	Polo Grounds, New York City, New York, US	
78	Win	72–4–2	Harry 'Kid' Brown	PTS	10	Sep 24, 1925	Shibe Park, Philadelphia, Pennsylvania, US	
77	Win	71–4–2	Jack Bernstein	PTS	12	Aug 31, 1925	Queensboro Stadium, New York City, New York, US	
76	Win	70–4–2	Jimmy Marino	KO	2 (8)	Aug 12, 1925	Airport, Atlantic City, New Jersey, US	
75	Win	69–4–2	Basil Galiano	PTS	12	Aug 4, 1925	Coney Island Stadium, New York City, New York, US	
74	Win	68–4–2	Charlie O'Connell	PTS	10	Jul 27, 1925	Queensboro Stadium, New York City, New York, US	
73	Win	67–4–2	Ace Hudkins	NWS	10	Jul 10, 1925	East Chicago, Indiana, US	
72	Win	66–4–2	Pal Moran	PTS	10	Jun 18, 1925	Dexter Park Stadium, New York City, New York, US	
71	Win	65–4–2	Johnny Dundee	PTS	15	Jun 12, 1925	Coney Island Stadium, New York City, New York, US	
70	Win	64–4–2	Lou Paluso	PTS	10	May 26, 1925	Queensboro Stadium, New York City, New York, US	
69	Win	63–4–2	Johnny Dundee	PTS	12	May 5, 1925	Madison Square Garden, New York City, New York, US	
68	Win	62–4–2	Rocky Kansas	DQ	5 (10)	Apr 27, 1925	Broadway Auditorium, Buffalo, New York, US	
67	Win	61–4–2	Lou Paluso	PTS	10	Mar 25, 1925	Manhattan Casino, New York City, New York, US	
66	Win	60–4–2	Pal Moran	NWS	12	Mar 2, 1925	Laurel Garden, Newark, New Jersey, US	
65	Loss	59–4–2	Sammy Mandell	PTS	12	Feb 6, 1925	Madison Square Garden, New York City, New York, US	
64	Win	59–3–2	Joe Hall	PTS	6	Jan 21, 1925	Broadway Auditorium, Buffalo, New York, US	
63	Win	58–3–2	Jimmy Goodrich	PTS	12	Jan 13, 1925	Pioneer Sporting Club, New York City, New York, US	
62	Win	57–3–2	Whitey Fitzgerald	PTS	10	Dec 15, 1924	Arena, Philadelphia, Pennsylvania, US	
61	Win	56–3–2	Luis Vicentini	PTS	12	Nov 26, 1924	Madison Square Garden, New York City, New York, US	
60	Win	55–3–2	Mel Coogan	KO	6 (12), 1:21	Nov 13, 1924	Clermont Avenue Rink, New York City, New York, US	
59	Win	54–3–2	Benny Valgar	PTS	10	Aug 19, 1924	Henderson's Bowl, New York City, New York, US	
58	Win	53–3–2	Jimmy Mars	DQ	7 (10)	Aug 8, 1924	Arena, Rockaway Beach, New York City, New York, US	
57	Win	52–3–2	Paul Fritsch	UD	10	Jul 1, 1924	Henderson's Bowl, New York City, New York, US	
56	Win	51–3–2	Al Shubert	PTS	10	Jun 20, 1924	Henderson's Bowl, New York City, New York, US	
55	Win	50–3–2	Eddie Wagner	PTS	12	Jun 3, 1924	Henderson's Bowl, New York City, New York, US	
54	Win	49–3–2	Andy Chaney	TKO	3 (10), 2:18	May 23, 1924	Henderson's Bowl, New York City, New York, US	
53	Win	48–3–2	Earl Baird	PTS	10	May 1, 1924	Rink S.C., New York City, New York, US	
52	Win	47–3–2	Sid Bernard	PTS	12	Apr 10, 1924	Rink S.C., New York City, New York, US	
51	Win	46–3–2	Phil Logan	PTS	10	Apr 2, 1924	Pioneer Sporting Club, New York City, New York, US	
50	Win	45–3–2	Eddie Brady	PTS	10	Mar 18, 1924	Pioneer Sporting Club, New York City, New York, US	
49	Win	44–3–2	Billy Henry	PTS	10	Feb 25, 1924	Broadway Arena, New York City, New York, US	
48	Win	43–3–2	Jack Hausner	PTS	10	Feb 7, 1924	Clermont Avenue Rink, New York City, New York, US	
47	Win	42–3–2	Johnny Lisse	KO	7 (12)	Jan 21, 1924	Lenox A.C., New York City, New York, US	
46	Loss	41–3–2	Eddie Wagner	KO	6 (12), 2:48	Jan 4, 1924	Madison Square Garden, New York City, New York, US	
45	Draw	41–2–2	Sammy Mandell	PTS	10	Dec 17, 1923	Madison Square Garden, New York City, New York, US	
44	Win	41–2–1	Dutch Brandt	PTS	12	Nov 29, 1923	Rink S.C., New York City, New York, US	
43	Win	40–2–1	Bud Dempsey	PTS	12	Nov 19, 1923	Lenox A.C., New York City, New York, US	
42	Win	39–2–1	Johnny Cooney	PTS	10	Oct 23, 1923	Pioneer Sporting Club, New York City, New York, US	
41	Win	38–2–1	Joey Baker	PTS	6	Oct 4, 1923	Clermont Avenue Rink, New York City, New York, US	
40	Win	37–2–1	Frankie Rice	NWS	10	Sep 17, 1923	Convention Hall, Lancaster, Pennsylvania, US	
39	Win	36–2–1	Jack Stark	PTS	6	Sep 12, 1923	Velodrome, New York City, New York, US	
38	Win	35–2–1	Larry Roach	PTS	6	Sep 7, 1923	Steeplechase A.A., New York City, New York, US	
37	Draw	34–2–1	Cuddy DeMarco	NWS	8	Sep 3, 1923	Waltz Dream Arena, Atlantic City, New Jersey, US	
36	Win	34–2	Rosey Stoy	NWS	8	Aug 20, 1923	Bacharach Ball Park, Atlantic City, New Jersey, US	
35	Win	33–2	Tony Vaccarelli	PTS	6	Aug 17, 1923	Steeplechase A.A., New York City, New York, US	
34	Win	32–2	Tony Palmer	PTS	6	Aug 9, 1923	Velodrome, New York City, New York, US	
33	Win	31–2	Joe Ritchie	NWS	8	Aug 6, 1923	Bacharach Ball Park, Atlantic City, New Jersey, US	
32	Loss	30–2	Earl Baird	PTS	6	Jul 14, 1923	Ridgewood Grove, New York City, New York, US	
31	Win	30–1	Ray Lucas	TKO	4 (6)	Jun 20, 1923	Broadway Arena, New York City, New York, US	
30	Win	29–1	Joey Silvers	PTS	6	Jun 13, 1923	Coney Island Velodrome, New York City, New York, US	
29	Win	28–1	Otto Goldberg	PTS	4	Jun 6, 1923	Commonwealth Sporting Club, New York City, New York, US	
28	Win	27–1	Frankie Sinclair	PTS	6	May 28, 1923	Fairmont AC, New York City, New York, US	
27	Win	26–1	Emanuel Lema	PTS	6	May 21, 1923	Broadway Arena, New York City, New York, US	
26	Win	25–1	Moe Ginsberg	PTS	6	May 12, 1923	Commonwealth Sporting Club, New York City, New York, US	
25	Win	24–1	Johnny Gunning	KO	3 (6)	Apr 30, 1923	Harlem-Fairmont AC, New York City, New York, US	
24	Win	23–1	Joey Silvers	PTS	6	Apr 16, 1923	Harlem-Fairmont AC, New York City, New York, US	
23	Win	22–1	Joey Silvers	PTS	6	Mar 19, 1923	Harlem-Fairmont AC, New York City, New York, US	
22	Win	21–1	Jimmy Joyce	PTS	6	Feb 21, 1923	Nashville, Tennessee, US	
21	Win	20–1	Tony Palmer	PTS	6	Feb 10, 1923	Clermont Avenue Rink, New York City, New York, US	
20	Win	19–1	Al Ketchell	PTS	6	Feb 6, 1923	Harlem-Fairmont AC, New York City, New York, US	
19	Win	18–1	Ray Scharra	KO	2 (4)	Feb 1, 1923	Commonwealth Sporting Club, New York City, New York, US	
18	Win	17–1	Tony Palmer	PTS	4	Jan 20, 1923	Rink SC, New York City, New York, US	
17	Win	16–1	Jackie Harris	PTS	4	Jan 17, 1923	Madison Square Garden, New York City, New York, US	
16	Win	15–1	Jackie Mellman	PTS	6	Jan 3, 1923	Harlem-Fairmont AC, New York City, New York, US	
15	Win	14–1	Tommy Hayes	KO	4 (6)	Dec 30, 1922	Clermont Avenue Rink, New York City, New York, US	
14	Win	13–1	Jimmy Joyce	PTS	6	Dec 18, 1922	Harlem-Fairmont AC, New York City, New York, US	
13	Win	12–1	Charley Hayes	PTS	6	Nov 27, 1922	Harlem-Fairmont AC, New York City, New York, US	
12	Win	11–1	Harry Mulcahy	PTS	6	Nov 13, 1922	Broadway Arena, New York City, New York, US	
11	Win	10–1	Willie Garber	PTS	6	Nov 3, 1922	Clermont Avenue Rink, New York City, New York, US	
10	Win	9–1	Lou Paluso	SD	6	Oct 21, 1922	Commonwealth Sporting Club, New York City, New York, US	
9	Win	8–1	Tommy Wilson	PTS	6	Sep 29, 1922	Palace of Joy, New York City, New York, US	
8	Win	7–1	Lou Guglielmini	PTS	4	Sep 11, 1922	NY Velodrome, New York City, New York, US	
7	Win	6–1	Joe Eppy	PTS	6	Aug 14, 1922	Broadway Arena, New York City, New York, US	
6	Win	5–1	Moe Ginsberg	PTS	6	Aug 4, 1922	Palace of Joy, New York City, New York, US	
5	Win	4–1	Willie Garber	PTS	6	Jul 21, 1922	Palace of Joy, New York City, New York, US	
4	Win	3–1	Marty Silvers	PTS	10	Jul 11, 1922	Oakland A.A., Jersey City, New Jersey, US	
3	Win	2–1	Larry Goldberg	PTS	6	Jul 7, 1922	Palace of Joy, New York City, New York, US	
2	Loss	1–1	Joe Ryder	KO	3 (8)	Jun 5, 1922	Broadway Arena, New York City, New York, US	Terris claimed he was hit low
1	Win	1–0	Jimmy Tomasulo	PTS	4	May 29, 1922	Dyckman Oval, New York City, New York, US	

== See also ==
- List of select Jewish boxers
