= Benny Valgar =

American boxer (1898–1974)

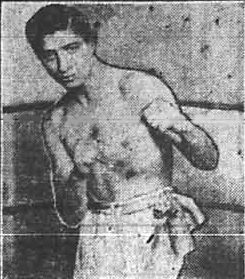

Personal information
- Nickname: The French Flash
- Nationality: American
- Born: September 24, 1898 Paris, France
- Died: October 1, 1972 (aged 74)
- Weight: Featherweight

Boxing career
- Stance: Orthodox

Boxing record
- Total fights: 217
- Wins: 160
- Win by KO: 18
- Losses: 37
- Draws: 16
- No contests: 4

Benny Valgar, frequently spelled "Valger" (September 24, 1898 – October 1, 1974), was a French-born American boxer. On February 25, 1920, he faced the reigning featherweight champion, Johnny Kilbane, in a 8-round non-title bout which, without a disqualification or knockout, had no official winner. According to all of newspaper writers who reported on the fight, Valgar won convincingly. Due to the fighters being over the featherweight limit of 124 pounds, the fight was not for Kilbane's championship. Kilbane could have waved the forfeit, but chose not to.

Valgar also made it to the semi-final bout of the NYSAC World Lightweight Boxing Championship against Jimmy Goodrich, whom he lost to in a close bout on June 15, 1925.

Showing promise at an early age, Valgar was the U.S. Bantamweight National Amateur champion in 1916. In evidence of his extraordinary defensive ring skills, he was one of only two American boxers of his era to have never been knocked out, though he fought over two hundred fights.

== Early life and boxing career ==
Benjamin "Benny" Valgar was born in Paris on September 24, 1898, to Jewish parents who had emigrated to France from Russia around 1894. He was one of five children of Etta and Menachem Valger. His mother, after her husband's death, emigrated to New York City in 1913. Benny and his younger sister arrived in New York the following year.

A prodigal boxer from an early age, he won the American Bantamweight National Title in 1916.

He began professional prizefighting that year, winning one of his first fights on July 1 against Joe Goodney at the Fairmont Athletic Club in the Bronx. On December 4, he beat Sammy Waltz, future Connecticut State Featherweight champion in fifteen rounds in Meriden, Connecticut. He lost only seven of his first sixty-five recorded fights with BoxRec between July 1916 and September 1919, beating Eddie Wallace in 1918 and 1919 in Philadelphia and Montreal. He fought 1925 World Lightweight Champion Rocky Kansas to a draw on November 9, 1918, in Philadelphia.

== Fights against world champions ==
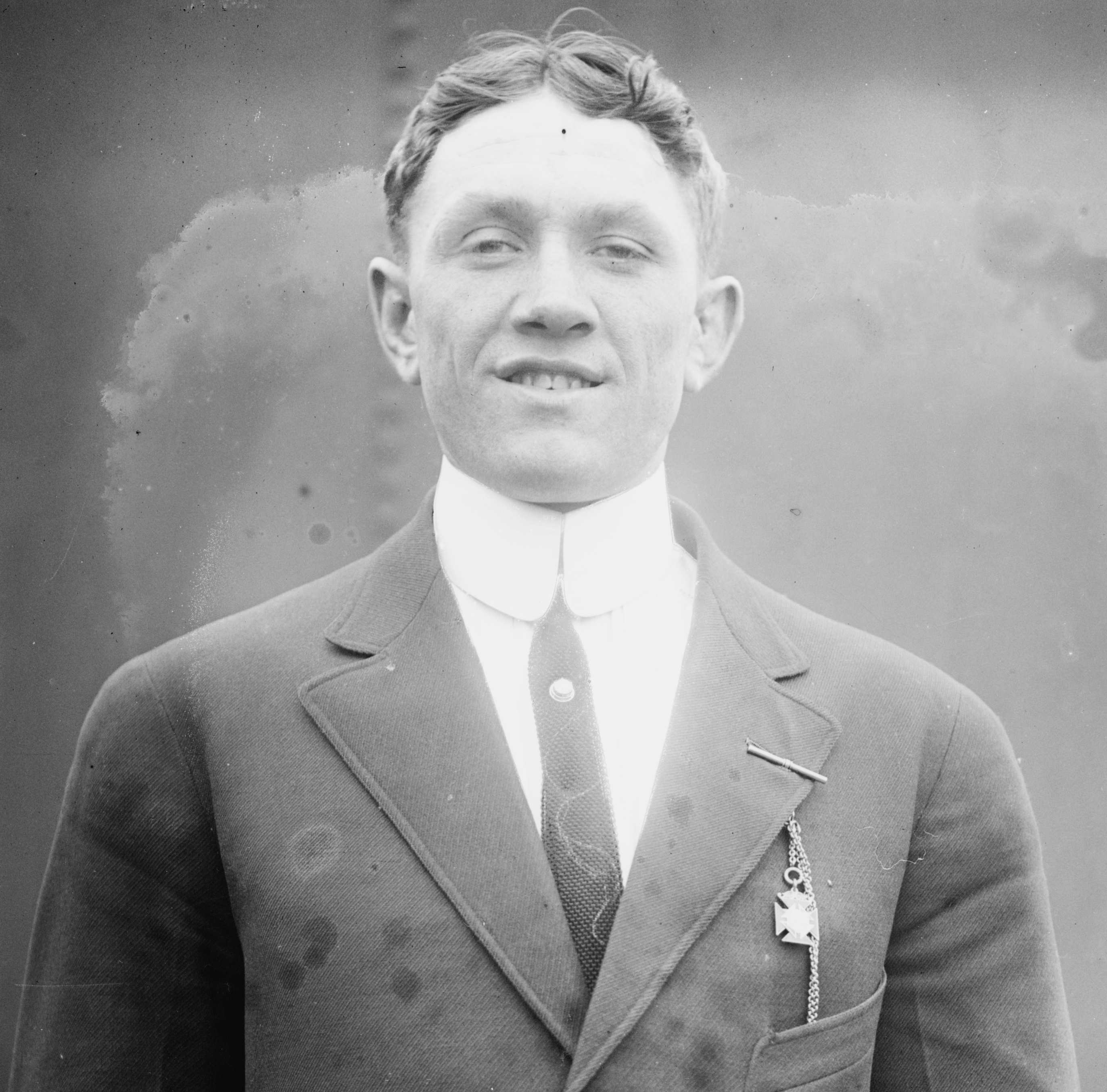
Johnny Kilbane, World Featherweight Champ

Valgar's trainer throughout the 1920s was the legendary Ray Arcel, and his manager was Billy Gibson, who also trained long reigning world lightweight champion Benny Leonard. Valgar and Leonard would often train together. As someone who would know, Arcel once said of Valgar, "When it came to all around ring generalship, Benny Valgar was on a par with Benny Leonard, though Leonard packed the better punch." Leonard once said of Valgar, that he was "the fastest boxer I ever knew." Arcel also noted that Gibson's concentration on Leonard as the reigning World Lightweight Champion may have increased the time and attention Arcel had to influence Valgar in his boxing career.

At the peak of his career on February 25, 1920, Valgar met Johnny Kilbane, reigning World Featherweight Champion at the Newark Athletic Club in Newark, New Jersey for an eight-round bout. New Jersey law did not allow decisions beyond eight rounds at the time. By agreement, a knockout would be required to win the official decision and in hundred fights only Benny Leonard had ever knocked out Kilbane. Valgar won the fight on a close points decision by the referees according to the New York Times.

An impressive array of newspapers agreed with the ruling that Valger had won the bout. These included the New York World, New York Tribune, and New York American. On February 26, the New York Times trumpeted the headlines in a large article, "Johnny Kilbane Outpointed By Benny Valgar in their Eight Round Bout at Newark." The Times wrote the boxers exhibited "brilliant footwork" and "showed knowledge of the scientific side of boxing". The article went on to note that the boxers "feinted and parried with the skill and effectiveness of veteran fencers".

Sid Terris, Lightweight Contender

One of the few boxers to defeat Valgar in his prime was Jewish boxer Sid Terris, the "Galloping Ghost" on August 19, 1924, at the Henderson Bowl in Brooklyn. Valgar in his prime was one of the few boxers that may have equaled Terris's ring skills and speed. Terris outpointed Valgar in a classic ten round bout before 14,000 fans.

== Competing for the Lightweight Championship of the World ==
Valgar also contended for the Lightweight Championship of the World in an elimination tournament by the New York State Athletic Commission (NYSAC) after Benny Leonard gave up his lightweight crown. He defeated Alex Hart, Basil Galiano, and Solly Seeman, in February, March and May 1925, finally losing to Jimmy Goodrich in twelve rounds in the semi-final bout of the tournament on June 15, 1925, in Queensboro Stadium in New York. According to sportswriter Mike Silver, much of the early betting favored Valger, as he had beaten Goodrich earlier in Buffalo.

During the tournament, newspapers continued to characterize Valger as a brilliant ringsman, but lacking a strong punch. The Reading Eagle wrote of his second bout with Galiano, that "Valgar showed boxing supremacy over his opponent, while Galiano had the better punch but could not land it." In a commanding performance, Valgar had come quite close to taking the Lightweight Crown. Goodrich took the title only one month later in the final bout against Chilean Boxer Stanislaus Loyaza winning in the second round after Loyaza was injured from a fall in the first caused by Goodrich's dominating punching. Valgar's making it to the semi-final bout was exceptional considering eighteen of the top lightweights in the world were invited to the tournament with only the world's top two lightweights, Sid Terris and Johnny Dundee declining.

Before they became champions or serious contenders, Valgar beat the exceptional boxers Rocky Kansas, and Jack Bernstein by the decision of newspapers. He fought and defeated top contender Charley White, as well as King Tut and Joe Tiplitz. He beat Frankie Britt, Hilario Martinez, Jimmy Fruzetti and Billy DeFoe by decision, although these boxers never became champions.

From 1928 to 1931, Valgar, fluent in French, fought primarily in France, Belgium, Italy and the United Kingdom. He continued to box top talent, but his speed diminished and he lost more frequently. Retaining his exceptional defensive skills, he was able to avoid the rough losses and knockouts common to so many boxers in their late boxing careers.

Even late in his career, Valgar was known for his ring generalship, or boxing skills, but rarely characterized as a strong puncher. When he drew with John Scuff, Featherweight champion of England on November 12, 1929, in Paris, the Montreal Gazette, wrote "It was one of the most scientific exhibitions of boxing ever seen in a Paris ring.

== Boxing retirement and later life ==
Valgar returned to the United States around 1931. He continued boxing, mostly in the New York area, until his retirement from the ring in 1932. He remained active in boxing veterans' organizations after his retirement to Brighton Beach, Brooklyn. His wife Rose, whom he had married in 1919 opened a dress shop in the Brownsville section of the borough.

Benny Valgar died in New York in October 1972. Benny's mother was buried in New York. Abraham longed to join his mother in America until the end of her life but could not travel from Europe to the US as he was a communist.
