= Jack Bernstein =

American boxer (1899–1945)

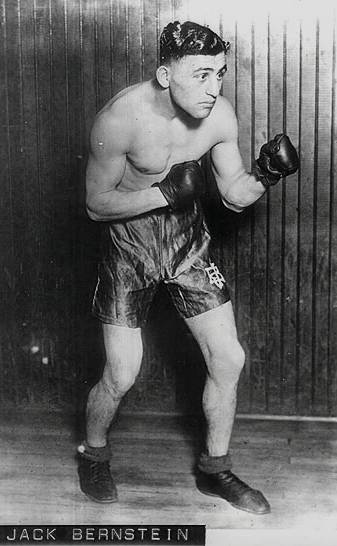

Personal information
- Born: John Dodick; November 5, 1899 Manhattan, New York
- Died: December 26, 1945 (aged 46) Yonkers, New York
- Height: 5 ft 3 in (1.60 m)
- Weight: Super Featherweight; Jr. Lightweight

Boxing career
- Stance: Orthodox

Boxing record
- Total fights: 89
- Wins: 60
- Win by KO: 14
- Losses: 21
- Draws: 8

Jack Bernstein (November 5, 1899 – December 26, 1945) was an American boxer given the birth name John Dodick. He became World Junior lightweight Champion, on May 30, 1923, against Johnny Dundee at the Coney Island Velodrome in Brooklyn. When he lost the title to Dundee on December 17, 1923, in a fifteen-round split decision at Madison Square Garden, many newspapers felt Bernstein clearly had the edge in the bout and should have retained the title.

== Early life and boxing career ==
John Dodick was born on December 5, 1899, in New York's Lower East Side, the second of seven children. He was compelled to drop out of elementary school to help his father, a fruitseller, support their large family. K. O. Brown, a leading lightweight contender, was reputed to be his first mentor at the Boys Club he attended, and a source of encouragement. According to one source, Dodick's third bout was with future lightweight legend Benny Leonard in a no decision six rounder. Dodick debuted in the New York fight clubs under the name "Young Kiddy" at age 15.

While stationed on the Mexican border after joining the army during World War I, he defeated Nick Gundy, Mexican Champ, in a tough twenty-round match in El Paso. As victor, he was given the title Featherweight Border Champion. Returning to his family's new home in Yonkers, Dodick continued fighting in local clubs, but discouraged, quit for a while to drive a truck. A new manager, druggist Lou Hirsch, took Dodick on, giving him the name Jack Bernstein, using the surname of the former local legend, Jewish featherweight contender, Joe Bernstein.

In a bout in which several papers wrote he deserved at least a draw, Bernstein lost to French Jewish boxer Benny Valger, a serious lightweight contender, on December 1, 1921, in a slashing twelve round-match in Yonkers, New York. Valger would come close to winning the lightweight championship against Johnny Kilbane in 1920, and would complete his long career without a single loss by knockout.

== Jr. Lightweight champion, 1923 ==
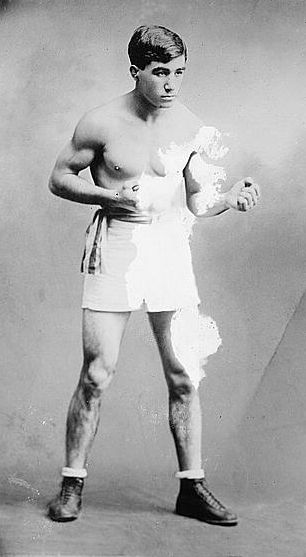
Johnny Dundee, 1923 Jr. Lightweight Champ

A contender by 1922, Bernstein won fourteen of his sixteen bouts that year, and beat known contenders Solly Seeman, Pal Moran, Kid Wagner, and Babe Herman. Winning a string of bouts in 1923, he finally met Jr. Lightweight Champion Johnny Dundee on May 30, in the Velodrome, in front of a crowd of 15,000. Though an underdog, he won a unanimous fifteen-round decision and took the title after coming back from a third-round knockdown.

=== Loss of Jr. Lightweight title, 1923 ===
Seven months later on December 17, 1923, in one of his first sanctioned defenses of the title, Bernstein lost to Johnny Dundee at Madison Square Garden in a highly controversial split decision. BoxRec noted that several newspaper sources, including the prestigious New York Times, believed the judges made the wrong decision in the bout. Author Ken Blady wrote that several of the judges may have been influenced to vote against Bernstein. Not all papers believed the fight was a runaway win for Bernstein, however. Although the Milwaukee Journal noted that Dundee finished strong in the bout, and agreed with the decision they also noted "the sentiment of the crowd, based on the fighters' round-by-round showing, was that Bernstein had won easily." Typical of the strong language of the many papers that disagreed with the decision was the Milwaukee Sentinel, who wrote "By probably the worst decision in local boxing history, Johnny Dundee of Jersey City regained his Junior Lightweight championship from Jack Bernstein."

In their third and final meeting Bernstein would beat Dundee decisively on September 15, 1924, in fifteen rounds in Queensboro Stadium in Queens.

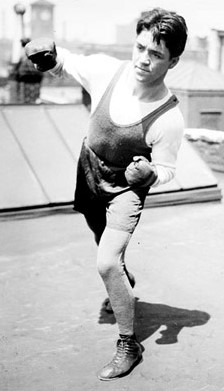
Sammy Mandell World Lightweight Champ, July 1926 – July 1930

In 1924, Bernstein fought Sammy Mandell and Rocky Kansas to draws. Mandell would hold the Lightweight World Championship from July 3, 1926 – July 17, 1930. After first drawing with Mandell in the Garden on January 11, 1924, in fifteen rounds, he lost to Mandell on May 16, 1924, in Louisville and on November 27, 1924, at Madison Square Garden. He drew with Kansas on February 18, 1924, in Buffalo, previously having beaten him on October 23, 1923, in the Garden. Kansas would later hold the Jr. Lightweight title for the first half of 1926.

From 1924 to 1927, Bernstein defeated Tommy O'Brien, Cuddy DeMarco, and Ray Miller. Bernstein defeated Jimmy Goodrich twice in both February and April 1927. Goodrich held the Lightweight Championship from July 13, 1925 – December 7, 1925. After defeating Goodrich, Bernstein had fought all three successors to Benny Leonard's lightweight crown, Mandell, Kansas, and Goodrich in competitive full length matches.

== Decline and retirement ==
Noticing he was losing stamina in late rounds, and feeling more fatigued than usual, Bernstein sought medical treatment on the advice of his handler "Doc" Lou Hirsh at the Battle Creek Sanatorium in Michigan around 1927, taking four months off. He fought well for a year, and then began losing a number of fights, again suffering from exhaustion. Bernstein's extremely rare knockout loss to Bruce Flowers on December 1, 1928, influenced his decision to leave boxing. It is quite possible that the fatigue he felt were the early signs of the heart condition with which he was diagnosed in 1945.

He retired as a competitor around the end of 1931, and promoted boxing around Westchester, New York, often benefiting philanthropic causes. On December 26, 1945, Bernstein died of a heart attack at St. Joseph's Hospital in Yonkers, New York. He had suffered from a heart ailment for many years and was aged 46 at the time of his death.

== Honors ==
Bernstein, who was Jewish, was inducted into the International Jewish Sports Hall of Fame in 2000.

== Selected fights ==
15 Wins, 9 Losses, 2 Draws
Result	Opponent(s)	Date	Location	Duration	Notes
Win	Nick Gundy	Dec 1918	Fort Bliss, El Paso	20 Rounds	"Border light title"
Loss	Nick Gundy	Dec 2, 1918	Fort Bliss, El Paso	10 Rounds	
Loss	Benny Valger	Dec 1, 1921	Yonkers	12 Rounds	Strong Lightwt. contender
Loss	Archie Walker	May 6, 1922	Brooklyn, NY	12 Rounds	Rare early loss
Win	Archie Walker	June 28, 1922	Yonkers, NY	12 Rounds	
Win	Solly Seeman	Jul 8, 1922	New York	12 Rounds	Strong Lightwt. contender
Win	Pal Moran	Oct 14, 1922	New York	12 Rounds	Strong Lightwt. contender
Win	Babe Herman	Nov 28, 1922	New York	12 Rounds	Strong Lightwt. contender
Win	Eddie Wagner	Dec 11, 1922	Mad. Sq. Gard., NY	10 Rounds UD	Strong Lightwt. contender
Win	Johnny Dundee	May 30, 1923	Brooklyn, NY	15 Rounds UD	Won World Jr. light title
Win	Freddie Jacks	Jun 25, 1923	Brooklyn, NY	8 Rounds KO	Kept Jr. light title
Win	Harry Kabakoff	Jul 10, 1923	Brooklyn, NY	10 Rounds NWS	Non-title
Loss	Harry "Kid" Brown	Jul 31, 1923	Brooklyn, NY	8 Rounds NWS	Non-title
Win	Rocky Kansas	Oct 12, 1923	Mad. Sq. Gard., NY	15 Rounds UD	
Loss	Johnny Dundee	Dec 17, 1923	Mad. Sq. Gard., NY	15 Rounds SD; Close fight	Lost World Jr. Light Title
_Draw	Sammy Mandell	Jan 11, 1924	Mad. Sq. Gard., NY	15 Rounds	Mandell broke hand
_Draw	Rocky Kansas	Feb 18, 1924	Buffalo, NY	10 Rounds	
Win	Jack Zivic	Jul 23, 1924	Buffalo, NY	12 Rounds	Elim. Bout for Light title
Win	Johnny Dundee	Sep 15, 1924	Queens, NY	12 Rounds	
Win	Johnny Dundee	Sep 15, 1924	Queens, NY	12 Rounds	
Loss	Sammy Mandell	Nov 7, 1924	Mad. Sq. Gard., NY	12 Rounds	
Loss	Sammy Mandell	Nov 7, 1924	Mad. Sq. Gard., NY	12 Rounds	
Loss	Sid Terris	Aug 31, 1925	Queens, NY	12 Rounds	
Loss	Sid Terris	Dec 12, 1925	Polo Grounds, NY	10 Rounds	
Win	Jimmy Goodrich	Feb 21, 1927	Brooklyn, NY	10 Rounds	
Win	Jimmy Goodrich	Apr 1, 1927	Buffalo, NY	10 Rounds	

== See also ==
- List of select Jewish boxers

Achievements
Preceded by Johnny Dundee	World Jr. Lightweight Champion; May 30, 1923 – December 30, 1923	Succeeded by Johnny Dundee
