= Morrie Sherman =

American boxer (born 1909)

Personal information
- Nickname: Murray
- Born: Moshe Sherman (Note: Also spelled Morris.); June 18, 1909 New York, U.S.
- Height: 5 ft 6 in (168 cm)
- Weight: Welterweight

Boxing career

Boxing record
- Total fights: 94
- Wins: 63
- Win by KO: 7
- Losses: 17
- Draws: 14

Morrie "Murray" Sherman (born Moshe Sherman) was an American professional boxer who competed from 1927 to 1936. He held the USA Michigan State welterweight title from 1929 to 1931, defending it eight times.

== Boxing career ==
Fighting out of Detroit, Michigan, Sherman went 16–4–4 in his first 24 professional bouts, before defeating Earl Wirth for the vacant USA Michigan State welterweight title on June 25, 1929.

On July 25, 1929, Sherman outpointed Billy Taylor over six rounds. On August 19, Sherman faced former three-time world welterweight champion Jack Britton in Grand Rapids, Michigan, earning a ten-round decision victory. On October 10, he faced former world lightweight champion Jimmy Goodrich, fighting him to a ten-round draw to retain his Michigan State welterweight title.

On May 9, 1930, Sherman faced Billy Light for the second time. After dropping a decision in their first meeting, Sherman reversed the result, earning a decision victory in the rematch.

On March 3, 1931, Sherman successfully defended his Michigan State welterweight title against Jack December, earning a ten-round decision victory.

On February 9, 1932, Sherman made his New York City debut at St. Nicholas Arena against Jimmy Abbott in the co-main event of a card headlined by Benny Leonard and Billy McMahon. Sherman knocked out Abbott one minute and 38 seconds into the sixth round. On March 18, Sherman faced Czech Olympian Franta Nekolny at Madison Square Garden, with the bout ending in a ten-round draw. On April 1, Sherman earned a ten-round decision victory over Phil Rafferty.

On July 17, 1934, Sherman faced future world colored welterweight and middleweight champion Cocoa Kid, who outpointed him over six rounds in a fast-paced contest. On October 29, Sherman fought Izzy Jannazzo to a draw over eight rounds.

On April 6, 1935, Sherman faced reigning Mexican welterweight champion Kid Azteca at the Arena Nacional in Mexico City, losing a one-sided decision after absorbing heavy punishment throughout the bout.

In his final professional bout on June 22, 1936, Sherman faced three-division world champion and reigning world welterweight champion Barney Ross in a non-title bout in Omaha, Nebraska, losing by second-round knockout.

Sherman retired in 1936 with a professional record of 63–17–14 including 7 victories by knockout. Between May 1930 and August 1932, Sherman was ranked as high as the No. 10 welterweight contender in the world by The Ring magazine. He was trained by Detroit boxing manager and promoter Al Werbe in 1930.

== Later life ==
After retiring from boxing, Sherman spent decades as a referee and judge in Detroit, Michigan, officiating bouts involving former world champions Archie Moore, Ike Williams, and Jake LaMotta.

One of the most notable bouts Sherman refereed took place on October 21, 1949, between future world welterweight champion Kid Gavilán and Lester Felton at Olympia Stadium, with Felton earning a controversial split-decision victory. Gavilán later claimed that during the fight he heard Sherman say something to Felton that he believed was an instruction to "make a point." Amid suspicions of gambling surrounding the result, Detroit Police Commissioner Harry S. Toy ordered an investigation. On October 27, the Michigan State Boxing Commission suspended Sherman and judge Sam Pearlstein over their scoring of the bout. The commission ultimately cleared Sherman and Pearlstein of wrongdoing on November 5, although Toy continued the police investigation amid suspicions of a betting scheme.

== Personal life ==
Sherman was Jewish. His younger brother Jackie was also a professional boxer.

== Professional boxing record ==
94 fights	63 wins	17 losses
By knockout	7	4
By decision	56	13
Draws	14	

No.	Result	Record	Opponent	Type	Round	Date	Location	Notes
94	Loss	63–17–14	Barney Ross	KO	2 (10)	Jun 22, 1936	City Auditorium, Omaha, Nebraska, U.S.	
93	Loss	63–16–14	Frankie Misko	PTS	10	Nov 29, 1935	Armory, Bay City, Michigan, U.S.	
92	Draw	63–15–14	Johnny Phagan	PTS	10	Nov 25, 1935	Marigold Gardens, Chicago, Illinois, U.S.	
91	Win	63–15–13	Carl Duva	TKO	6 (10)	Aug 5, 1935	Hinchliffe Stadium, Paterson, New Jersey, U.S.	
90	Win	62–15–13	Thurston McKinney	PTS	10	Jun 20, 1935	Armory, Muskegon, Michigan, U.S.	
89	Win	61–15–13	Eddie Speaks	KO	1 (10)	Jun 10, 1935	Arena Gardens Bowl, Detroit, Michigan, U.S.	
88	Win	60–15–13	Red Speaks	KO	1 (10)	May 24, 1935	Arena Gardens, Detroit, Michigan, U.S.	
87	Loss	59–15–13	Kid Azteca	PTS	10	Apr 6, 1935	Arena Nacional, Mexico City, Mexico	
86	Win	59–14–13	Carl Duva	PTS	10	Mar 14, 1935	Music Hall, Paterson, New Jersey, U.S.	
85	Draw	58–14–13	Christy Lewis	PTS	10	Feb 22, 1935	Music Hall, Paterson, New Jersey, U.S.	
84	Win	58–14–12	Pedro Nieves	KO	6	Feb 12, 1935	Orpheum Theatre, Paterson, New Jersey, U.S.	
83	Draw	57–14–12	Christy Lewis	PTS	10	Jan 31, 1935	Music Hall, Paterson, New Jersey, U.S.	
82	Draw	57–14–11	Ray Napolitano	PTS	10	Jan 15, 1935	Armory, Reading, Pennsylvania, U.S.	
81	Win	57–14–10	Frankie Hughes	PTS	10	Dec 3, 1934	Riding & Hunting Club, Washington, D.C., U.S.	
80	Win	56–14–10	Antonio Dominguez	SD	8	Nov 12, 1934	Riding & Hunting Club, Washington, D.C., U.S.	
79	Draw	55–14–10	Izzy Jannazzo	PTS	8	Oct 29, 1934	St. Nicholas Arena, New York City, New York, U.S.	
78	Win	55–14–9	Johnny O'Keefe	PTS	10	Oct 25, 1934	Passaic, New Jersey, U.S.	
77	Win	54–14–9	Eddie Moore	PTS	10	Sep 21, 1934	Paterson, New Jersey, U.S.	
76	Win	53–14–9	Matty Mario	PTS	10	Aug 30, 1934	Paterson, New Jersey, U.S.	
75	Win	52–14–9	Mickey Salem	TKO	4 (8)	Aug 20, 1934	Meadowbrook Bowl, Newark, New Jersey, U.S.	
74	Loss	51–14–9	Cocoa Kid	PTS	6	Jul 17, 1934	Coney Island Velodrome, Brooklyn, New York City, U.S.	
73	Win	51–13–9	Jay Macedon	PTS	10	Jul 12, 1934	Convention Hall, Asbury Park, New Jersey, U.S.	
72	Win	50–13–9	Mickey Salem	KO		Jun 28, 1934	Armory, Paterson, New Jersey, U.S.	
71	Draw	49–13–9	Johnny O'Keefe	PTS	10	May 31, 1934	Market Street Arena, Paterson, New Jersey, U.S.	
70	Win	49–13–8	Tony Rock	PTS	10	May 8, 1934	Municipal Auditorium, Kingston, New York, U.S.	
69	Draw	48–13–8	Johnny Phagan	PTS	10	Oct 27, 1933	Cicero Stadium, Cicero, Illinois, U.S.	
68	Loss	48–13–7	Billy Holt	SD	10	Feb 24, 1933	Northside Arena, Pittsburgh, Pennsylvania, U.S.	
67	Loss	48–12–7	Frankie Misko	PTS	10	Jan 23, 1933	Saginaw, Michigan, U.S.	
66	Loss	48–11–7	Jack December	PTS	10	Dec 14, 1932	Arena Gardens, Detroit, Michigan, U.S.	
65	Loss	48–10–7	Paulie Walker	PTS	10	Dec 9, 1932	Detroit, Michigan, U.S.	
64	Win	48–9–7	Eddie McKenna	PTS	8	Nov 14, 1932	St. Nicholas Arena, New York City, New York, U.S.	
63	Win	47–9–7	Lew Schaffer	PTS	10	Sep 29, 1932	Baseball Stadium, Montreal, Quebec, Canada	
62	Win	46–9–7	Frankie Petrolle	PTS	10	Aug 19, 1932	Beach Casino, Asbury Park, New Jersey, U.S.	
61	Loss	45–9–7	King Tut	PTS	10	May 13, 1932	Madison Square Garden, New York City, New York, U.S.	
60	Win	45–8–7	Charley Johnson	PTS	10	May 2, 1932	St. Nicholas Arena, New York City, New York, U.S.	
59	Win	44–8–7	Phil Rafferty	PTS	10	Apr 1, 1932	Madison Square Garden, New York City, New York, U.S.	
58	Draw	43–8–7	Franta Nekolny	PTS	10	Mar 18, 1932	Madison Square Garden, New York City, New York, U.S.	
57	Win	43–8–6	Jimmy Abbott	KO	6 (8)	Feb 29, 1932	St. Nicholas Arena, New York City, New York, U.S.	
56	Win	42–8–6	Jimmy Hill	PTS	10	Feb 1, 1932	Saginaw, Michigan, U.S.	
55	Win	41–8–6	Pee Wee Jarrell	PTS	10	Dec 18, 1931	Saginaw, Michigan, U.S.	
54	Loss	40–8–6	Jimmy Hill	KO	2 (10)	Nov 10, 1931	Armory, Indianapolis, Indiana, U.S.	
53	Win	40–7–6	Billy Brophy	PTS	?	Nov 2, 1931	Ypsilanti, Michigan, U.S.	
52	Win	39–7–6	Tug Phillips	PTS	10	Oct 14, 1931	Detroit, Michigan, U.S.	
51	Win	38–7–6	My Sullivan	PTS	10	Jul 31, 1931	Amphitheatre Rink, Winnipeg, Manitoba, Canada	
50	Win	37–7–6	Pete Petroskey	PTS	10	Jun 25, 1931	Muskegon, Michigan, U.S.	
49	Win	36–7–6	Johnny Clancy	PTS	10	May 28, 1931	Thumb Arena, Port Huron, Michigan, U.S.	Retained USA Michigan State welterweight title
48	Win	35–7–6	Harry Fine	PTS	10	Apr 28, 1931	Detroit, Michigan, U.S.	
47	Win	34–7–6	Billy Bulley	PTS	8	Apr 7, 1931	Mount Clemens, Michigan, U.S.	
46	Win	33–7–6	Jack December	PTS	10	Mar 3, 1931	Mount Clemens, Michigan, U.S.	Retained USA Michigan State welterweight title
45	Win	32–7–6	Frankie White	PTS	6	Jan 26, 1931	Olympia Stadium, Detroit, Michigan, U.S.	
44	Loss	31–7–6	Tug Phillips	KO	8 (10)	Oct 9, 1930	Olympia Stadium, Detroit, Michigan, U.S.	
43	Win	31–6–6	Freddie Fitzgerald	PTS	10	Sep 29, 1930	Detroit, Michigan, U.S.	
42	Win	30–6–6	Freddie Fitzgerald	PTS	10	Aug 26, 1930	Hamtramck Stadium, Detroit, Michigan, U.S.	
41	Draw	29–6–6	Howard McLain	PTS	10	Jul 24, 1930	Lansing, Michigan, U.S.	Retained USA Michigan State welterweight title
40	Win	29–6–5	Mel Tipton	PTS	10	May 15, 1930	Saginaw, Michigan, U.S.	Retained USA Michigan State welterweight title
39	Win	28–6–5	Billy Light	PTS	8	May 9, 1930	Olympia Stadium, Detroit, Michigan, U.S.	
38	Win	27–6–5	Billy Alger	PTS	10	Apr 23, 1930	Dreamland, Detroit, Michigan, U.S.	
37	Win	26–6–5	Giuseppe Reguzzoni	PTS	10	Apr 2, 1930	Danceland Arena, Detroit, Michigan, U.S.	Retained USA Michigan State welterweight title
36	Loss	25–6–5	Giuseppe Reguzzoni	PTS	10	Feb 26, 1930	Danceland Arena, Detroit, Michigan, U.S.	
35	Loss	25–5–5	Billy Light	PTS	10	Feb 12, 1930	Danceland Arena, Detroit, Michigan, U.S.	
34	Win	25–4–5	Freddie Bernard	PTS	6	Jan 31, 1930	Olympia Stadium, Detroit, Michigan, U.S.	
33	Win	24–4–5	Twain Marks	PTS	10	Dec 11, 1929	Westside Athletic Club, Detroit, Michigan, U.S.	
32	Win	23–4–5	Sammy Caruso	PTS	10	Nov 22, 1929	Lansing, Michigan, U.S.	Retained USA Michigan State welterweight title
31	Draw	22–4–5	Jimmy Goodrich	PTS	10	Oct 10, 1929	Detroit, Michigan, U.S.	Retained USA Michigan State welterweight title
30	Win	22–4–4	Billy Stob	DQ	5 (10)	Oct 2, 1929	Danceland Arena, Detroit, Michigan, U.S.	Retained USA Michigan State welterweight title
29	Win	21–4–4	Billy Stob	PTS	10	Sep 3, 1929	Mack Park, Detroit, Michigan, U.S.	Retained USA Michigan State welterweight title
28	Win	20–4–4	Jack Britton	PTS	10	Aug 19, 1929	Ramona Baseball Park, Grand Rapids, Michigan, U.S.	
27	Win	19–4–4	Billy Taylor	PTS	6	Jul 25, 1929	State Fairgrounds Arena, Detroit, Michigan, U.S.	
26	Win	18–4–4	Butch Otto	PTS	10	Jul 9, 1929	Saginaw, Michigan, U.S.	Retained USA Michigan State welterweight title
25	Win	17–4–4	Earl Wirth	PTS	10	Jun 25, 1929	Lansing, Michigan, U.S.	Won vacant USA Michigan State welterweight title
24	Win	16–4–4	Doty Turner	PTS	10	Jun 10, 1929	Bay City, Michigan, U.S.	
23	Win	15–4–4	Frank Grover	NWS	10	May 24, 1929	Armory, Bay City, Michigan, U.S.	
22	Draw	14–4–4	Johnny Bangert	PTS	10	Mar 22, 1929	Bay City, Michigan, U.S.	
21	Win	14–4–3	Butch Otto	PTS	6	Mar 11, 1929	Fairview A.C., Detroit, Michigan, U.S.	
20	Win	13–4–3	Joe Sharkey	NWS	10	Feb 13, 1929	Elks Temple, Niles, Michigan, U.S.	
19	Draw	12–4–3	Fritz Anderson	PTS	8	Feb 5, 1929	Mount Clemens, Michigan, U.S.	
18	Win	12–4–2	Doty Turner	PTS	10	Jan 25, 1929	Bay City, Michigan, U.S.	
17	Win	11–4–2	Morrie Baker	PTS	8	Jan 12, 1929	Westside Athletic Club, Detroit, Michigan, U.S.	
16	Win	10–4–2	Ben Lozich	PTS	6	Dec 5, 1928	Detroit, Michigan, U.S.	
15	Draw	9–4–2	Jack Storey	PTS	8	Nov 26, 1928	Fairview A.C., Detroit, Michigan, U.S.	
14	Loss	9–4–1	Freddy Middaugh	NWS	6	Nov 16, 1928	Armory, Toledo, Ohio, U.S.	
13	Win	9–3–1	Joey Oliver	KO	6	Nov 1, 1928	Detroit, Michigan, U.S.	
12	Win	8–3–1	Frank Grover	PTS	6	Oct 10, 1928	Danceland Arena, Detroit, Michigan, U.S.	
11	Win	7–3–1	Freddy Middaugh	PTS	6	Sep 5, 1928	Toledo, Ohio, U.S.	
10	Draw	6–3–1	Frank Grover	NWS	8	Aug 30, 1928	Jackson, Michigan, U.S.	
9	Loss	6–3–0	Jack Bentley	TKO	5 (8)	Jul 23, 1928	Broadway Bowl, Louisville, Kentucky, U.S.	
8	Loss	6–2–0	Tommy Red Bragan	PTS	4	Jul 11, 1928	Fairview A.C., Detroit, Michigan, U.S.	
7	Win	6–1–0	Walter Majeske	PTS	6	Jun 26, 1928	Saginaw, Michigan, U.S.	
6	Win	5–1–0	Mel Tipton	PTS	6	Jun 19, 1928	Flint, Michigan, U.S.	
5	Loss	4–1–0	Freddie Bernard	PTS	6	May 17, 1928	Olympia Stadium, Detroit, Michigan, U.S.	
4	Win	4–0–0	Lorne Ayling	PTS	6	Apr 9, 1928	Fairview A.C., Detroit, Michigan, U.S.	
3	Win	3–0–0	Ben Lozich	PTS	4	Mar 28, 1928	Detroit, Michigan, U.S.	
2	Win	2–0–0	Harry Shervic	PTS	4	Oct 3, 1927	Fairview A.C., Detroit, Michigan, U.S.	
1	Win	1–0–0	Matt Priez	PTS	4	Sep 26, 1927	Fairview A.C., Detroit, Michigan, U.S.	

== See also ==
- List of male boxers
