= Tozzo =

Tozzo may refer to:

- Andrea Tozzo (born 1992), Italian footballer
- Rocco Tozzo (1893–1954), Italian-American boxer better known as Rocky Kansas
- Tozzo (died 778), bishop of Augsburg

== See also ==
- Tozzi
