= Sammy Mandell =

American boxer (1904–1967)

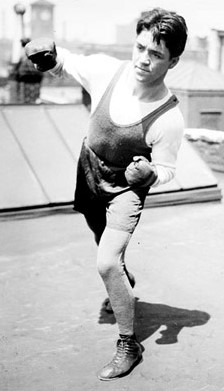

Personal information
- Nicknames: Rockford Sheik; Rockford Flash
- Nationality: American
- Born: Salvatore Mandala; February 5, 1904 Rockford, Illinois, United States or Piana del Greci, Sicily
- Died: November 7, 1967 (aged 63) Oak Park, Illinois, United States
- Height: 5 ft 6 in (1.68 m)
- Weight: Lightweight

Boxing career
- Reach: 67 in (170 cm)
- Stance: Orthodox

Boxing record
- Total fights: 191; With the inclusion of newspaper decisions
- Wins: 147
- Win by KO: 32
- Losses: 25
- Draws: 17
- No contests: 2

Sammy Mandell (a.k.a. Samuel Mandella; February 5, 1904 – November 7, 1967) was an American Undisputed World lightweight boxing champion from 1926 to 1930. Born in Rockford, Illinois, and named Salvatore Mandala, he was known as the "Rockford Sheik" due to his Rudolph Valentino like good looks and as the "Rockford Flash" due to his fast hands and foot speed. His father was an Albanian and his mother Italian. Statistical boxing website BoxRec ranks Mandell as the 13th greatest lightweight boxer to have ever lived. He was inducted into the International Boxing Hall of Fame in 1998.

== Amateur career ==
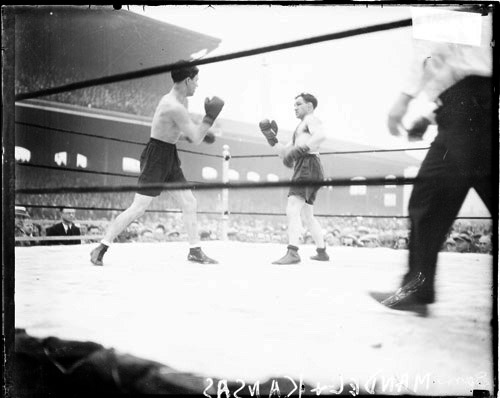
Mandell (left) during his bout with Rocky Kansas

Mandell developed his fighting skills at the Camp Grant barracks in Rockford, Illinois. He was too young and underweight to join the army, weighing 105 lbs. Despite this, his persistence in hanging around the wrestling and boxing training areas saw him gain permission to join in with the military personnel. The camp boxing instructor at the time was Fred Dyer, "The Singing Boxer," who recalled in a 1926 interview how Mandell beat every soldier in the bantamweight class and was able to best men 10 lbs heavier than him. Dyer also stated that he advised Mandell to turn professional.

== Pro career ==
On July 17, 1925, future champion Mandell fought Solly Seeman in East Chicago, Indiana. Seeman knocked down Mandell in the first round, and in the opinion of many ringside had the edge throughout the bout.

Trained by Jack Blackburn, Mandell was a skilled fighter who had fast hands and impressive defensive skills. He won the championship when he outpointed Rocky Kansas on July 3, 1926. He defended his crown against four contenders, including against hall of famers and future champions Tony Canzoneri and Jimmy McLarnin. In a startling upset, Mandell lost the crown when he was knocked out by Al Singer in the first round.

== Professional boxing record ==
All information in this section is derived from BoxRec, unless otherwise stated.

=== Official record ===
191 fights	88 wins	22 losses
By knockout	32	6
By decision	55	15
By disqualification	1	1
Draws	10	
No contests	2	
Newspaper decisions/draws	69	

All newspaper decisions are officially regarded as “no decision” bouts and are not counted to the win/loss/draw column.

No.	Result	Record	Opponent	Type	Round	Date	Age	Location	Notes
191	Loss	88–22–10 (71)	Joe Bernal	TKO	6 (10)	Jun 27, 1934	30 years, 142 days	Auditorium, Oakland, California, U.S.	
190	Win	88–21–10 (71)	Chuchi Vasquez	KO	2 (10)	Apr 12, 1934	30 years, 66 days	Fort Warren, Cheyenne, Wyoming, U.S.	
189	Win	87–21–10 (71)	Buddy Jackson	PTS	10	Mar 31, 1934	30 years, 54 days	Rock Springs, Wyoming, U.S.	
188	Draw	86–21–10 (71)	Archie Kovich	PTS	10	Mar 23, 1934	30 years, 46 days	Chestnut St. Arena, Reno, California, U.S.	
187	Loss	86–21–9 (71)	Al Manfredo	KO	4 (10)	Mar 13, 1934	30 years, 36 days	Ryan's Auditorium, Fresno, California, U.S.	
186	Win	86–20–9 (71)	Tommy Elks	TKO	2 (10)	Mar 2, 1934	30 years, 25 days	Nogales, Arizona, U.S.	
185	Win	85–20–9 (71)	Mike Nelson	PTS	8	Feb 23, 1934	30 years, 18 days	Broadway Arena, Tucson, Arizona, U.S.	
184	Win	84–20–9 (71)	Chuchi Vasquez	TKO	6 (10)	Feb 16, 1934	30 years, 11 days	Broadway Arena, Tucson, Arizona, U.S.	
183	Loss	83–20–9 (71)	Tony Herrera	TKO	6 (10)	Jan 31, 1934	29 years, 360 days	Liberty Hall, El Paso, Texas, U.S.	
182	Win	83–19–9 (71)	Sherald Kennard	PTS	10	Dec 15, 1933	29 years, 313 days	Fargo, North Dakota, U.S.	
181	Draw	82–19–9 (71)	Johnny Stanton	PTS	10	Dec 11, 1933	29 years, 309 days	Sioux Falls, South Dakota, U.S.	
180	Win	82–19–8 (71)	Vernon Nelson	NWS	8	Nov 6, 1933	29 years, 274 days	Auditorium, Sioux City, South Dakota, U.S.	
179	Loss	82–19–8 (70)	Jackie Davis	PTS	10	Oct 23, 1933	29 years, 260 days	Public Hall, Cleveland, Ohio, U.S.	
178	Loss	82–18–8 (70)	Mickey Serrian	UD	6	Oct 13, 1933	29 years, 250 days	Arena, Syracuse, New York, U.S.	
177	Loss	82–17–8 (70)	Iowa Joe Rivers	PTS	10	Sep 4, 1933	29 years, 211 days	Windsor Arena, Windsor, Ontario, Canada	
176	Loss	82–16–8 (70)	Tommy Bland	PTS	10	Aug 19, 1933	29 years, 195 days	Arena Gardens, Kirkland Lake, Ontario, Canada	
175	Win	82–15–8 (70)	Bud Jennings	KO	4 (10)	Aug 2, 1933	29 years, 178 days	Tecumseh Park, London, Ontario, Canada	
174	Win	81–15–8 (70)	Frankie Hayes	PTS	10	Jul 4, 1933	29 years, 149 days	Auditorium, Ottawa, Ontario, Canada	
173	Loss	80–15–8 (70)	Ron Headley	SD	10	Jun 19, 1933	29 years, 134 days	Auditorium, Ottawa, Ontario, Canada	
172	Win	80–14–8 (70)	Ray Collins	PTS	10	Jun 14, 1933	29 years, 129 days	Ashtabula, Ohio, U.S.	
171	Loss	79–14–8 (70)	Young Stuhley	NWS	10	Nov 25, 1932	28 years, 294 days	Clinton, Iowa, U.S.	
170	Win	79–14–8 (69)	Billy Hoon	NWS	10	Oct 25, 1932	28 years, 263 days	Clinton, Iowa, U.S.	
169	Win	79–14–8 (68)	Frankie Burns	NWS	?	Oct 7, 1932	28 years, 245 days	Dubuque, Iowa, U.S.	
168	Loss	79–14–8 (67)	Tod Morgan	PTS	10	Jul 8, 1932	28 years, 154 days	Legion Stadium, Hollywood, California, U.S.	
167	Win	79–13–8 (67)	Frankie Diaz	PTS	6	Jun 17, 1932	28 years, 133 days	Imperial Valley A.C., El Centro, California, U.S.	
166	Win	78–13–8 (67)	Eddie Foster	PTS	10	Apr 11, 1932	28 years, 66 days	Daytona Beach, Florida, U.S.	
165	Loss	77–13–8 (67)	Gus Campbell	PTS	10	Mar 14, 1932	28 years, 38 days	Biscayne Arena, Miami, Florida, U.S.	
164	Win	77–12–8 (67)	Jimmy Spivey	PTS	10	Feb 17, 1932	28 years, 12 days	National Guard Arena, Daytona Beach, Florida, U.S.	
163	NC	76–12–8 (67)	Ralph Lenny	NC	8 (10)	Nov 4, 1931	27 years, 272 days	Chicago Stadium, Chicago, Illinois, U.S.	
162	Draw	76–12–8 (66)	Joey Harrison	PTS	10	Oct 8, 1931	27 years, 245 days	Armory, Paterson, New Jersey, U.S.	
161	Win	76–12–7 (66)	Owens Duvernay	PTS	10	Sep 8, 1931	27 years, 215 days	Coliseum Arena, New Orleans, Louisiana, U.S.	
160	Loss	75–12–7 (66)	Louis 'Kid' Kaplan	PTS	10	Aug 24, 1931	27 years, 200 days	Hurley Stadium, East Hartford, Connecticut, U.S.	
159	Loss	75–11–7 (66)	Steve Wolanin	PTS	10	Aug 14, 1931	27 years, 190 days	Utica Stadium, Utica, New York, U.S.	
158	Draw	75–10–7 (66)	Wilbur Stokes	PTS	10	Jul 10, 1931	27 years, 155 days	Benjamin Field Arena, Tampa, Florida, U.S.	
157	Win	75–10–6 (66)	Jose Estrada	PTS	10	Mar 31, 1931	27 years, 54 days	Daytona Beach, Florida, U.S.	
156	Win	74–10–6 (66)	Dick Gore	KO	4 (10)	Feb 27, 1931	27 years, 22 days	Daytona Beach, Florida, U.S.	
155	Loss	73–10–6 (66)	Maxie Strub	PTS	10	Dec 5, 1930	26 years, 303 days	Carney Auditorium, Erie, Pennsylvania, U.S.	
154	Loss	73–9–6 (66)	Steve Halaiko	PTS	8	Dec 1, 1930	26 years, 299 days	Convention Hall, Rochester, New York, U.S.	
153	Win	73–8–6 (66)	Tony Ligouri	NWS	10	Oct 27, 1930	26 years, 264 days	Coliseum, Des Moines, Iowa, U.S.	
152	Win	73–8–6 (65)	Joe Trippe	PTS	10	Oct 10, 1930	26 years, 247 days	Broadway Auditorium, Buffalo, New York, U.S.	
151	Win	72–8–6 (65)	Spug Myers	NWS	8	Oct 2, 1930	26 years, 239 days	Memorial Coliseum, Cedar Rapids, Iowa, U.S.	
150	Win	72–8–6 (64)	Tommy Herman	PTS	8	Sep 26, 1930	26 years, 233 days	Coliseum, Chicago, Illinois, U.S.	
149	Win	71–8–6 (64)	Mickey O'Neill	PTS	10	Sep 15, 1930	26 years, 222 days	Fairgrounds, Janesville, Wisconsin, U.S.	
148	Loss	70–8–6 (64)	Al Singer	KO	1 (15)	Jul 17, 1930	26 years, 162 days	Yankee Stadium, Bronx, New York City, New York, U.S.	Lost NYSAC, NBA, and The Ring lightweight titles
147	Win	70–7–6 (64)	Izzy Kline	KO	3 (10)	Jun 17, 1930	26 years, 132 days	Prudden Auditorium, Lansing, Michigan, U.S.	
146	Draw	69–7–6 (64)	Tommy Grogan	PTS	10	May 9, 1930	26 years, 93 days	Ak-sar-ben Coliseum, Omaha, Nebraska, U.S.	
145	Win	69–7–5 (64)	Pee Wee Jarrell	PTS	10	Apr 30, 1930	26 years, 84 days	Armory, Grand Rapids, Michigan, U.S.	
144	Loss	68–7–5 (64)	Jimmy McLarnin	UD	10	Mar 1, 1930	26 years, 24 days	Chicago Stadium, Chicago, Illinois, U.S.	
143	Win	68–6–5 (64)	Joey Goodman	PTS	12	Feb 3, 1930	25 years, 363 days	Public Hall, Cleveland, Ohio, U.S.	
142	Draw	67–6–5 (64)	Manuel Quintero	PTS	10	Jan 15, 1930	25 years, 344 days	Carter's Arena, Miami Beach, Florida, U.S.	
141	Win	67–6–4 (64)	Herman Perlick	PTS	10	Dec 13, 1929	25 years, 311 days	Grand Rapids, Michigan, U.S.	
140	Win	66–6–4 (64)	Joe Azzarella	KO	2 (8)	Nov 21, 1929	25 years, 289 days	Arcadia Ballroom, Milwaukee, Wisconsin, U.S.	
139	Loss	65–6–4 (64)	Jimmy McLarnin	SD	10	Nov 4, 1929	25 years, 272 days	Chicago Stadium, Chicago, Illinois, U.S.	
138	Win	65–5–4 (64)	Ray Kiser	NWS	8	Sep 23, 1929	25 years, 230 days	Memphis, Tennessee, U.S.	
137	Win	65–5–4 (63)	Luis Vicentini	PTS	10	Sep 6, 1929	25 years, 213 days	Chicago Stadium, Chicago, Illinois, U.S.	
136	Win	64–5–4 (63)	Frankie Frisco	TKO	3 (10)	Aug 28, 1929	25 years, 204 days	Petoskey, Illinois, U.S.	
135	Win	63–5–4 (63)	Tony Canzoneri	SD	10	Aug 2, 1929	25 years, 178 days	Chicago Stadium, Chicago, Illinois, U.S.	Retained NYSAC, NBA, and The Ring lightweight titles
134	Win	62–5–4 (63)	Tony Lombardo	PTS	10	Jun 20, 1929	25 years, 135 days	Jackson County Farigrounds, Jackson, Michigan, U.S.	
133	Win	61–5–4 (63)	Jackie Nichols	TKO	7 (10)	Jun 7, 1929	25 years, 122 days	Marsh Field, Muskegon, Michigan, U.S.	
132	Win	60–5–4 (63)	Frankie Nelson	PTS	10	Apr 25, 1929	25 years, 79 days	Prudden Auditorium, Lansing, Michigan, U.S.	
131	Win	59–5–4 (63)	Benny Duke	PTS	10	Apr 12, 1929	25 years, 66 days	Grand Rapids, Michigan, U.S.	
130	Win	58–5–4 (63)	Don Davis	PTS	10	Feb 4, 1929	24 years, 365 days	Peoria, Illinois, U.S.	
129	Win	57–5–4 (63)	Jack Gillespie	NWS	10	Jan 22, 1929	24 years, 352 days	Armory, Indianapolis, Indiana, U.S.	
128	Loss	57–5–4 (62)	Jimmy Goodrich	TKO	2 (10)	Sep 25, 1928	24 years, 233 days	Athletic Park, Flint, Michigan, U.S.	
127	Win	57–4–4 (62)	Johnny O'Donnell	TKO	8 (10)	Aug 14, 1928	24 years, 191 days	Janesville, Wisconsin, U.S.	
126	Win	56–4–4 (62)	Jimmy McLarnin	UD	15	May 21, 1928	24 years, 106 days	Polo Grounds, Manhattan, New York City, New York, U.S.	Retained NYSAC, NBA, and The Ring lightweight titles
125	Win	55–4–4 (62)	Eddie Wagner	PTS	10	Apr 17, 1928	24 years, 72 days	Olympia Stadium, Detroit, Michigan, U.S.	
124	Win	54–4–4 (62)	Jackie Fields	UD	10	Feb 23, 1928	24 years, 18 days	Coliseum, Chicago, Illinois, U.S.	
123	Win	53–4–4 (62)	Billy Petrolle	NWS	10	Jan 13, 1928	23 years, 342 days	Auditorium, Minneapolis, Minnesota, U.S.	
122	Win	53–4–4 (61)	Johnny O'Donnell	NWS	10	Dec 16, 1927	23 years, 314 days	Municipal Auditorium, Minneapolis, Minnesota, U.S.	
121	Win	53–4–4 (60)	Jimmy Sacco	PTS	10	Dec 9, 1927	23 years, 307 days	Mechanics Building, Boston, Massachusetts, U.S.	
120	Win	52–4–4 (60)	Babe Ruth	PTS	10	Nov 23, 1927	23 years, 291 days	108th Field Artillery Armory, Philadelphia, Pennsylvania, U.S.	Not to be confused with Babe Ruth
119	Win	51–4–4 (60)	Spug Myers	PTS	10	Nov 15, 1927	23 years, 283 days	Coliseum, Chicago, Illinois, U.S.	
118	Win	50–4–4 (60)	Wildcat Monte	KO	3 (10)	Oct 24, 1927	23 years, 261 days	Tulsa, Oklahoma, U.S.	
117	Win	49–4–4 (60)	Joe Trabon	NWS	10	Oct 11, 1927	23 years, 248 days	Convention Hall, Kansas City, Kansas, U.S.	
116	Win	49–4–4 (59)	Midget Guery	NWS	10	Sep 5, 1927	23 years, 212 days	Tacoma Bowl, Dayton, Ohio, U.S.	
115	Win	49–4–4 (58)	Phil McGraw	PTS	10	Jul 16, 1927	23 years, 161 days	University of Detroit Stadium, Detroit, Michigan, U.S.	Retained NYSAC, NBA, and The Ring lightweight titles
114	Win	48–4–4 (58)	Steve Adams	KO	2 (10)	Jun 1, 1927	23 years, 116 days	Memorial Hall, Kansas City, Kansas, U.S.	Adams died of injuries sustained from the fight
113	Win	47–4–4 (58)	Johnny Valdez	KO	2 (10)	Apr 11, 1927	23 years, 65 days	Armory, Tucson, Arizona, U.S.	
112	Loss	46–4–4 (58)	Jackie Fields	NWS	10	Apr 4, 1927	23 years, 58 days	Wrigley Field, Los Angeles, California, U.S.	
111	Win	46–4–4 (57)	Tommy White	NWS	10	Mar 25, 1927	23 years, 48 days	Gardner Park Arena, Dallas, Texas, U.S.	
110	Win	46–4–4 (56)	Armand Schaekels	PTS	10	Jan 31, 1927	22 years, 360 days	Benjamin Field Arena, Tampa, Florida, U.S.	
109	Win	45–4–4 (56)	Eddie Dwyer	NWS	10	Jan 14, 1927	22 years, 343 days	Forum, Wichita, Kansas, U.S.	
108	Win	45–4–4 (55)	Jimmy Lanning	NWS	10	Jan 10, 1927	22 years, 339 days	Pittsburg, Kansas, U.S.	
107	Win	45–4–4 (54)	Roy Moore	KO	6 (12)	Nov 15, 1926	22 years, 283 days	Jefferson County Armory, Louisville, Kentucky, U.S.	
106	Win	44–4–4 (54)	Jack Duffy	NWS	12	Nov 12, 1926	22 years, 280 days	Armory, Toledo, Ohio, U.S.	
105	Win	44–4–4 (53)	Clausine Vincent	NWS	10	Oct 29, 1926	22 years, 266 days	Coliseum, Oklahoma City, Oklahoma, U.S.	NYSAC, NBA, and The Ring lightweight titles at stake; (via KO only)
104	Win	44–4–4 (52)	Larry Cappo	NWS	10	Oct 20, 1926	22 years, 257 days	Memorial Hall, Kansas City, Kansas, U.S.	
103	Win	44–4–4 (51)	Joe Jawson	NWS	10	Oct 8, 1926	22 years, 245 days	Harlem Park, Rockford, Illinois, U.S.	NYSAC, NBA, and The Ring lightweight titles at stake; (via KO only)
102	Win	44–4–4 (50)	Rocky Kansas	PTS	10	Jul 3, 1926	22 years, 148 days	Comiskey Park, Chicago, Illinois, U.S.	Won NYSAC, NBA, and The Ring lightweight titles
101	Win	43–4–4 (50)	Sidney Glick	TKO	2 (10)	May 7, 1926	22 years, 91 days	Legion Stadium, Hollywood, California, U.S.	
100	Win	42–4–4 (50)	Charlie Feraci	PTS	10	Apr 30, 1926	22 years, 84 days	Coliseum, San Diego, California, U.S.	
99	Win	41–4–4 (50)	Harry 'Kid' Brown	NWS	10	Apr 9, 1926	22 years, 63 days	East Chicago, Indiana, U.S.	
98	Win	41–4–4 (49)	Teddy O'Hara	PTS	10	Feb 16, 1926	22 years, 11 days	Arena, Vernon, California, U.S.	
97	Win	40–4–4 (49)	Johnny Adams	PTS	10	Feb 5, 1926	22 years, 0 days	Legion Stadium, Hollywood, California, U.S.	
96	Win	39–4–4 (49)	Jack Sparr	PTS	10	Jan 27, 1926	21 years, 356 days	Wilmington Bowl, Wilmington, California, U.S.	
95	Win	38–4–4 (49)	Babe Picato	TKO	7 (10)	Jan 22, 1926	21 years, 351 days	Bakersfield Arena, Bakersfield, California, U.S.	
94	Win	37–4–4 (49)	Teddy O'Hara	PTS	10	Jan 15, 1926	21 years, 344 days	Legion Stadium, Hollywood, California, U.S.	
93	Win	36–4–4 (49)	Jimmy Cashill	NWS	10	Dec 7, 1925	21 years, 305 days	Peoria, Illinois, U.S.	
92	Draw	36–4–4 (48)	Phil McGraw	PTS	12	Oct 12, 1925	21 years, 249 days	Windsor Arena, Windsor, Ontario, Canada	
91	Win	36–4–3 (48)	Eddie Raynor	TKO	4 (10)	Sep 17, 1925	21 years, 224 days	Armory, Champaign, Illinois, U.S.	
90	Win	35–4–3 (48)	Bobby Ward	PTS	10	Aug 31, 1925	21 years, 207 days	Jefferson Barracks Amphitheater, Lemay, Missouri, U.S.	
89	Win	34–4–3 (48)	Solly Seeman	PTS	10	Aug 25, 1925	21 years, 201 days	Coney Island Stadium, Brooklyn, New York City, New York, U.S.	
88	Win	33–4–3 (48)	Sid Barbarian	UD	10	Aug 17, 1925	21 years, 193 days	Fairgrounds Coliseum, Detroit, Michigan, U.S.	
87	Win	32–4–3 (48)	Frankie Burns	NWS	10	Aug 6, 1925	21 years, 182 days	Madison, Wisconsin, U.S.	
86	Win	32–4–3 (47)	Solly Seeman	NWS	10	Jul 17, 1925	21 years, 162 days	East Chicago, Indiana, U.S.	
85	Win	32–4–3 (46)	Phil Salvadore	PTS	10	Jun 6, 1925	21 years, 121 days	Ascot Park, Los Angeles, California, U.S.	
84	Loss	31–4–3 (46)	Jimmy Goodrich	DQ	6 (10)	May 18, 1925	21 years, 102 days	Queensboro Stadium, Long Island City, Queens, New York City, New York, U.S.	
83	Win	31–3–3 (46)	Joe Azzarella	NWS	10	Apr 20, 1925	21 years, 74 days	Janesville, Wisconsin, U.S.	
82	Win	31–3–3 (45)	Joe Sieloff	NWS	10	Apr 3, 1925	21 years, 57 days	Madison, Wisconsin, U.S.	
81	Win	31–3–3 (44)	Sid Terris	PTS	12	Feb 6, 1925	21 years, 1 day	Madison Square Garden, Manhattan, New York City, New York, U.S.	
80	Win	30–3–3 (44)	Charlie Feraci	RTD	5 (10)	Jan 12, 1925	20 years, 342 days	Memphis, Tennessee, U.S.	
79	Win	29–3–3 (44)	Jack Bernstein	PTS	12	Nov 7, 1924	20 years, 276 days	Madison Square Garden, Manhattan, New York City, New York, U.S.	
78	Loss	28–3–3 (44)	Phil Salvadore	PTS	4	Oct 7, 1924	20 years, 245 days	Arena, Vernon, California, U.S.	
77	Win	28–2–3 (44)	Johnny Adams	PTS	4	Sep 30, 1924	20 years, 238 days	Arena, Vernon, California, U.S.	
76	Win	27–2–3 (44)	Oakland Frankie Burns	PTS	4	Sep 26, 1924	20 years, 234 days	Legion Stadium, Hollywood, California, U.S.	
75	Win	26–2–3 (44)	Billy Wallace	UD	4	Sep 24, 1924	20 years, 232 days	Auditorium, Oakland, California, U.S.	
74	Win	25–2–3 (44)	Dick Hoppe	UD	4	Sep 12, 1924	20 years, 220 days	Legion Stadium, Hollywood, California, U.S.	
73	Draw	24–2–3 (44)	Archie Walker	NWS	10	Aug 18, 1924	20 years, 191 days	Olympic Arena, Brooklyn, New York City, New York, U.S.	
72	Win	24–2–3 (43)	Eddie Wagner	NWS	12	Aug 14, 1924	20 years, 191 days	Idora Park, Youngstown, Ohio, U.S.	
71	Win	24–2–3 (42)	Joe Azzarella	NWS	10	Jul 18, 1924	20 years, 164 days	Open-air Arena, East Chicago, Indiana, U.S.	
70	Win	24–2–3 (41)	Johnny Dundee	NWS	10	Jun 9, 1924	20 years, 125 days	Open-air Arena, East Chicago, Indiana, U.S.	
69	Win	24–2–3 (40)	Paul Fritsch	NWS	8	May 31, 1924	20 years, 116 days	Floyd Fitzsimmons' Arena, Michigan City, Indiana, U.S.	
68	Win	24–2–3 (39)	Jack Bernstein	NWS	12	May 16, 1924	20 years, 101 days	Jefferson County Armory, Louisville, Kentucky, U.S.	
67	Win	24–2–3 (38)	Billy Henry	NWS	10	Apr 21, 1924	20 years, 76 days	East Chicago, Indiana, U.S.	
66	Win	24–2–3 (37)	Mickey O'Dowd	NWS	10	Mar 24, 1924	20 years, 48 days	East Chicago, Indiana, U.S.	
65	Draw	24–2–3 (36)	Jack Bernstein	PTS	15	Jan 11, 1924	19 years, 340 days	Madison Square Garden, Manhattan, New York City, New York, U.S.	
64	Draw	24–2–2 (36)	Sid Terris	PTS	10	Dec 17, 1923	19 years, 315 days	Madison Square Garden, Manhattan, New York City, New York, U.S.	
63	Win	24–2–1 (36)	Eddie Brady	NWS	10	Dec 3, 1923	19 years, 301 days	East Chicago, Indiana, U.S.	
62	Win	24–2–1 (35)	Babe Herman	PTS	12	Nov 13, 1923	19 years, 281 days	Pioneer Sporting Club, Manhattan, New York City, New York, U.S.	
61	Win	23–2–1 (35)	Harry 'Kid' Brown	PTS	12	Oct 26, 1923	19 years, 263 days	Madison Square Garden, Manhattan, New York City, New York, U.S.	
60	Win	22–2–1 (35)	Eddie Wagner	NWS	10	Oct 5, 1923	19 years, 242 days	Mullen-Sager Arena, Aurora, Illinois, U.S.	
59	Win	22–2–1 (34)	Joe Fox	NWS	10	Sep 17, 1923	19 years, 224 days	Tomlinson Hall, Indianapolis, Indiana, U.S.	
58	Draw	22–2–1 (33)	Louis Margolis	NWS	10	Aug 28, 1923	19 years, 204 days	Riverside Arena, Covington, Kentucky, U.S.	
57	Win	22–2–1 (32)	Harry Kabakoff	NWS	10	Aug 24, 1923	19 years, 200 days	Mullen-Sager Arena, Aurora, Illinois, U.S.	
56	Win	22–2–1 (31)	Frankie Frisco	NWS	8	Jul 31, 1923	19 years, 176 days	Mullen-Sager Arena, Aurora, Illinois, U.S.	
55	Win	22–2–1 (30)	Sailor Larsen	NWS	10	Jul 23, 1923	19 years, 168 days	Three Eyes Ballpark, Peoria, Illinois, U.S.	
54	Win	22–2–1 (29)	Battling Harry Leonard	TKO	4 (10)	Jun 26, 1923	19 years, 141 days	East Chicago, Indiana, U.S.	
53	Win	21–2–1 (29)	George Butch	NWS	8	Jun 21, 1923	19 years, 136 days	Mullen-Sager Arena, Aurora, Illinois, U.S.	
52	Win	21–2–1 (28)	Jack "Kid" Wolfe	PTS	12	Jun 13, 1923	19 years, 128 days	Elmwood Arena, Elmwood Place, Ohio, U.S.	
51	Win	20–2–1 (28)	Johnny Mahoney	KO	5 (10)	May 31, 1923	19 years, 115 days	Waterloo Theatre, Waterloo, Iowa, U.S.	
50	Win	19–2–1 (28)	Frankie Garcia	NWS	8	May 29, 1923	19 years, 113 days	Dexter Park Pavilion, Chicago, Illinois, U.S.	
49	Win	19–2–1 (27)	Eddie Walsh	TKO	2 (6)	May 21, 1923	19 years, 105 days	Ashland Blvd. Auditorium, Chicago, Illinois, U.S.	
48	Win	18–2–1 (27)	Johnny Lisse	TKO	6 (8)	Apr 24, 1923	19 years, 78 days	Dexter Park Pavilion, Chicago, Illinois, U.S.	
47	Loss	17–2–1 (27)	Joey Sangor	TKO	7 (10)	Mar 9, 1923	19 years, 32 days	Kenwood Armory, Minneapolis, Minnesota, U.S.	
46	Draw	17–1–1 (27)	Cowboy Eddie Anderson	PTS	10	Feb 15, 1923	19 years, 10 days	Armory, Minneapolis, Minnesota, U.S.	
45	Loss	17–1–1 (26)	Frankie Garcia	PTS	10	Feb 9, 1923	19 years, 4 days	U.S.S. Commodore, Lake Michigan, U.S.	
44	Win	17–0–1 (26)	Stewart McLean	NWS	10	Feb 1, 1923	18 years, 361 days	Kenwood Armory, Minneapolis, Minnesota, U.S.	
43	Win	17–0–1 (25)	Frankie Howell	KO	5 (8)	Dec 19, 1922	18 years, 317 days	United States of America	
42	Win	16–0–1 (25)	Harvey Bright	PTS	10	Dec 11, 1922	18 years, 309 days	Madison Square Garden, Manhattan, New York City, New York, U.S.	
41	Win	15–0–1 (25)	Sammy Frager	TKO	6 (8)	Nov 27, 1922	18 years, 295 days	Memphis, Tennessee, U.S.	
40	Win	14–0–1 (25)	Joey Sangor	NWS	10	Nov 20, 1922	18 years, 288 days	Castle Ice Gardens, Milwaukee, Wisconsin, U.S.	
39	Win	14–0–1 (24)	Jack "Kid" Wolfe	NWS	10	Oct 30, 1922	18 years, 267 days	Kenosha, Wisconsin, U.S.	
38	Win	14–0–1 (23)	Johnny McCoy	PTS	8	Aug 7, 1922	18 years, 183 days	Southern A.C., Memphis, Tennessee, U.S.	
37	Draw	13–0–1 (23)	Memphis Pal Moore	NWS	8	Jul 4, 1922	18 years, 149 days	Russwood Park, Memphis, Tennessee, U.S.	
36	Loss	13–0–1 (22)	Cowboy Eddie Anderson	NWS	10	Jun 26, 1922	18 years, 141 days	Moline, Illinois, U.S.	
35	Win	13–0–1 (21)	Marty Henderson	NWS	10	Jun 5, 1922	18 years, 120 days	Rockford, Illinois, U.S.	
34	Win	13–0–1 (20)	Joe Burman	NWS	10	May 29, 1922	18 years, 113 days	Mullen-Sager Arena, Aurora, Illinois, U.S.	
33	Win	13–0–1 (19)	George Spencer	DQ	5 (12)	Apr 7, 1922	18 years, 61 days	U.S.S. Commodore, Lake Michigan, U.S.	
32	Win	12–0–1 (19)	Whitey Ross	NWS	10	Mar 16, 1922	18 years, 39 days	La Salle, Illinois, U.S.	
31	Win	12–0–1 (18)	Frankie Garcia	PTS	8	Feb 13, 1922	18 years, 8 days	Memphis, Tennessee, U.S.	
30	Win	11–0–1 (18)	Eddie Ketchell	NWS	10	Jan 23, 1922	17 years, 352 days	K of C Hall, Terre Haute, Indiana, U.S.	
29	Win	11–0–1 (17)	Jack Eile	PTS	10	Jan 13, 1922	17 years, 342 days	U.S.S. Commodore, Lake Michigan, U.S.	
28	Win	10–0–1 (17)	Sammy Frager	TKO	4 (10)	Dec 5, 1921	17 years, 303 days	Omaha, Nebraska, U.S.	
27	Win	9–0–1 (17)	Jack Eile	PTS	10	Nov 29, 1921	17 years, 297 days	Chicago, Illinois, U.S.	
26	Win	8–0–1 (17)	Barney Doolan	KO	3 (?)	Nov 3, 1921	17 years, 271 days	Chicago, Illinois, U.S.	
25	Win	7–0–1 (17)	Joe Miller	NWS	10	Oct 7, 1921	17 years, 244 days	Auditorium, Cedar Rapids, Iowa, U.S.	
24	Draw	7–0–1 (16)	Young Farrell	NWS	8	Sep 5, 1921	17 years, 212 days	Sager's Arena, Aurora, Illinois, U.S.	
23	Win	7–0–1 (15)	Memphis Pal Moore	NWS	10	Aug 26, 1921	17 years, 202 days	Sager's Arena, Aurora, Illinois, U.S.	
22	Win	7–0–1 (14)	Willie Green	NWS	10	Aug 17, 1921	17 years, 193 days	Camp Grant arena, Rockford, Illinois, U.S.	
21	Draw	7–0–1 (13)	Babe Asher	NWS	10	Jul 15, 1921	17 years, 160 days	Sager's Arena, Aurora, Illinois, U.S.	
20	Win	7–0–1 (12)	Stanley Everett	NWS	10	Jul 1, 1921	17 years, 146 days	Pekin, Illinois, U.S.	
19	Win	7–0–1 (11)	Mike Eulo	TKO	1 (10)	Jun 28, 1921	17 years, 143 days	Twin City A.C., East Chicago, Indiana, U.S.	
18	Win	6–0–1 (11)	Johnny Gannon	NWS	10	Jun 9, 1921	17 years, 124 days	Camp Grant arena, Rockford, Illinois, U.S.	
17	NC	6–0–1 (10)	Johnny Gannon	NC	5 (10)	May 18, 1921	17 years, 102 days	Liberty Theater, Camp Grant, Illinois, U.S.	Gannon hit low and could not continue Physician's exam later determined the fight could have continued
16	Win	6–0–1 (9)	Johnny Hagen	NWS	10	Mar 16, 1921	17 years, 39 days	Elk's Lodge, Janesville, Wisconsin, U.S.	
15	Win	6–0–1 (8)	Jockey Joe Dillon	NWS	8	Jan 1, 1921	16 years, 331 days	Auditorium, Milwaukee, Wisconsin, U.S.	
14	Win	6–0–1 (7)	Barney Doolan	NWS	10	Oct 5, 1920	16 years, 243 days	Kenosha, Wisconsin, U.S.	
13	Draw	6–0–1 (6)	Kid Flannery	NWS	10	Sep 6, 1920	16 years, 214 days	Camp Grant arena, Rockford, Illinois, U.S.	
12	Win	6–0–1 (5)	Barney Doolan	NWS	10	Aug 28, 1920	16 years, 205 days	East Chicago, Indiana, U.S.	
11	Win	6–0–1 (4)	Frankie Izzo	NWS	10	Aug 14, 1920	16 years, 191 days	East Chicago, Indiana, U.S.	
10	Win	6–0–1 (3)	Eddie Corbett	TKO	5 (6)	Aug 5, 1920	16 years, 182 days	American Legion, Belvidere, Illinois, U.S.	
9	Win	5–0–1 (3)	Johnny Gannon	NWS	8	Jul 28, 1920	16 years, 174 days	Camp Grant arena, Rockford, Illinois, U.S.	
8	Win	5–0–1 (2)	Kid Unger	KO	3 (6)	May 31, 1920	16 years, 116 days	Camp Grant arena, Rockford, Illinois, U.S.	
7	Win	4–0–1 (2)	Johnny Gannon	TKO	3 (6)	Apr 21, 1920	16 years, 76 days	Liberty Theater, Camp Grant, Illinois, U.S.	
6	Win	3–0–1 (2)	Johnny Hagerman	KO	3 (?)	Apr 7, 1920	16 years, 62 days	Camp Grant, Illinois, U.S.	
5	Win	2–0–1 (2)	Benny Shapiro	PTS	8	Feb 5, 1920	16 years, 0 days	Saint Louis, Missouri, U.S.	
4	Win	1–0–1 (2)	Eddie Hagerman	TKO	4 (6)	Jan 29, 1920	15 years, 358 days	Temple Theatre, Alton, Illinois, U.S.	
3	Win	0–0–1 (2)	Stubby Sandy	NWS	4	Nov 12, 1919	15 years, 280 days	Liberty Theater, Camp Grant, Illinois, U.S.	
2	Win	0–0–1 (1)	Stubby Sandy	NWS	4	Sep 13, 1919	15 years, 220 days	Quincy, Illinois, U.S.	
1	Draw	0–0–1	Clifford Lobdell	PTS	4	Jul 23, 1919	15 years, 168 days	Camp Grant arena, Rockford, Illinois, U.S.	

=== Unofficial record ===
191 fights	147 wins	25 losses
By knockout	32	6
By decision	114	18
By disqualification	1	1
Draws	17	
No contests	2	

Record with the inclusion of newspaper decisions to the win/loss/draw column.

No.	Result	Record	Opponent	Type	Round	Date	Age	Location	Notes
191	Loss	147–25–17 (2)	Joe Bernal	TKO	6 (10)	Jun 27, 1934	30 years, 142 days	Auditorium, Oakland, California, U.S.	
190	Win	147–24–17 (2)	Chuchi Vasquez	KO	2 (10)	Apr 12, 1934	30 years, 66 days	Fort Warren, Cheyenne, Wyoming, U.S.	
189	Win	146–24–17 (2)	Buddy Jackson	PTS	10	Mar 31, 1934	30 years, 54 days	Rock Springs, Wyoming, U.S.	
188	Draw	145–24–17 (2)	Archie Kovich	PTS	10	Mar 23, 1934	30 years, 46 days	Chestnut St. Arena, Reno, California, U.S.	
187	Loss	145–24–16 (2)	Al Manfredo	KO	4 (10)	Mar 13, 1934	30 years, 36 days	Ryan's Auditorium, Fresno, California, U.S.	
186	Win	145–23–16 (2)	Tommy Elks	TKO	2 (10)	Mar 2, 1934	30 years, 25 days	Nogales, Arizona, U.S.	
185	Win	144–23–16 (2)	Mike Nelson	PTS	8	Feb 23, 1934	30 years, 18 days	Broadway Arena, Tucson, Arizona, U.S.	
184	Win	143–23–16 (2)	Chuchi Vasquez	TKO	6 (10)	Feb 16, 1934	30 years, 11 days	Broadway Arena, Tucson, Arizona, U.S.	
183	Loss	142–23–16 (2)	Tony Herrera	TKO	6 (10)	Jan 31, 1934	29 years, 360 days	Liberty Hall, El Paso, Texas, U.S.	
182	Win	142–22–16 (2)	Sherald Kennard	PTS	10	Dec 15, 1933	29 years, 313 days	Fargo, North Dakota, U.S.	
181	Draw	141–22–16 (2)	Johnny Stanton	PTS	10	Dec 11, 1933	29 years, 309 days	Sioux Falls, South Dakota, U.S.	
180	Win	141–22–15 (2)	Vernon Nelson	NWS	8	Nov 6, 1933	29 years, 274 days	Auditorium, Sioux City, South Dakota, U.S.	
179	Loss	140–22–15 (2)	Jackie Davis	PTS	10	Oct 23, 1933	29 years, 260 days	Public Hall, Cleveland, Ohio, U.S.	
178	Loss	140–21–15 (2)	Mickey Serrian	UD	6	Oct 13, 1933	29 years, 250 days	Arena, Syracuse, New York, U.S.	
177	Loss	140–20–15 (2)	Iowa Joe Rivers	PTS	10	Sep 4, 1933	29 years, 211 days	Windsor Arena, Windsor, Ontario, Canada	
176	Loss	140–19–15 (2)	Tommy Bland	PTS	10	Aug 19, 1933	29 years, 195 days	Arena Gardens, Kirkland Lake, Ontario, Canada	
175	Win	140–18–15 (2)	Bud Jennings	KO	4 (10)	Aug 2, 1933	29 years, 178 days	Tecumseh Park, London, Ontario, Canada	
174	Win	139–18–15 (2)	Frankie Hayes	PTS	10	Jul 4, 1933	29 years, 149 days	Auditorium, Ottawa, Ontario, Canada	
173	Loss	138–18–15 (2)	Ron Headley	SD	10	Jun 19, 1933	29 years, 134 days	Auditorium, Ottawa, Ontario, Canada	
172	Win	138–17–15 (2)	Ray Collins	PTS	10	Jun 14, 1933	29 years, 129 days	Ashtabula, Ohio, U.S.	
171	Loss	137–17–15 (2)	Young Stuhley	NWS	10	Nov 25, 1932	28 years, 294 days	Clinton, Iowa, U.S.	
170	Win	137–16–15 (2)	Billy Hoon	NWS	10	Oct 25, 1932	28 years, 263 days	Clinton, Iowa, U.S.	
169	Win	136–16–15 (2)	Frankie Burns	NWS	?	Oct 7, 1932	28 years, 245 days	Dubuque, Iowa, U.S.	
168	Loss	135–16–15 (2)	Tod Morgan	PTS	10	Jul 8, 1932	28 years, 154 days	Legion Stadium, Hollywood, California, U.S.	
167	Win	135–15–15 (2)	Frankie Diaz	PTS	6	Jun 17, 1932	28 years, 133 days	Imperial Valley A.C., El Centro, California, U.S.	
166	Win	134–15–15 (2)	Eddie Foster	PTS	10	Apr 11, 1932	28 years, 66 days	Daytona Beach, Florida, U.S.	
165	Loss	133–15–15 (2)	Gus Campbell	PTS	10	Mar 14, 1932	28 years, 38 days	Biscayne Arena, Miami, Florida, U.S.	
164	Win	133–14–15 (2)	Jimmy Spivey	PTS	10	Feb 17, 1932	28 years, 12 days	National Guard Arena, Daytona Beach, Florida, U.S.	
163	NC	132–14–15 (2)	Ralph Lenny	NC	8 (10)	Nov 4, 1931	27 years, 272 days	Chicago Stadium, Chicago, Illinois, U.S.	
162	Draw	132–14–15 (1)	Joey Harrison	PTS	10	Oct 8, 1931	27 years, 245 days	Armory, Paterson, New Jersey, U.S.	
161	Win	132–14–14 (1)	Owens Duvernay	PTS	10	Sep 8, 1931	27 years, 215 days	Coliseum Arena, New Orleans, Louisiana, U.S.	
160	Loss	131–14–14 (1)	Louis 'Kid' Kaplan	PTS	10	Aug 24, 1931	27 years, 200 days	Hurley Stadium, East Hartford, Connecticut, U.S.	
159	Loss	131–13–14 (1)	Steve Wolanin	PTS	10	Aug 14, 1931	27 years, 190 days	Utica Stadium, Utica, New York, U.S.	
158	Draw	131–12–14 (1)	Wilbur Stokes	PTS	10	Jul 10, 1931	27 years, 155 days	Benjamin Field Arena, Tampa, Florida, U.S.	
157	Win	131–12–13 (1)	Jose Estrada	PTS	10	Mar 31, 1931	27 years, 54 days	Daytona Beach, Florida, U.S.	
156	Win	130–12–13 (1)	Dick Gore	KO	4 (10)	Feb 27, 1931	27 years, 22 days	Daytona Beach, Florida, U.S.	
155	Loss	129–12–13 (1)	Maxie Strub	PTS	10	Dec 5, 1930	26 years, 303 days	Carney Auditorium, Erie, Pennsylvania, U.S.	
154	Loss	129–11–13 (1)	Steve Halaiko	PTS	8	Dec 1, 1930	26 years, 299 days	Convention Hall, Rochester, New York, U.S.	
153	Win	129–10–13 (1)	Tony Ligouri	NWS	10	Oct 27, 1930	26 years, 264 days	Coliseum, Des Moines, Iowa, U.S.	
152	Win	128–10–13 (1)	Joe Trippe	PTS	10	Oct 10, 1930	26 years, 247 days	Broadway Auditorium, Buffalo, New York, U.S.	
151	Win	127–10–13 (1)	Spug Myers	NWS	8	Oct 2, 1930	26 years, 239 days	Memorial Coliseum, Cedar Rapids, Iowa, U.S.	
150	Win	126–10–13 (1)	Tommy Herman	PTS	8	Sep 26, 1930	26 years, 233 days	Coliseum, Chicago, Illinois, U.S.	
149	Win	125–10–13 (1)	Mickey O'Neill	PTS	10	Sep 15, 1930	26 years, 222 days	Fairgrounds, Janesville, Wisconsin, U.S.	
148	Loss	124–10–13 (1)	Al Singer	KO	1 (15)	Jul 17, 1930	26 years, 162 days	Yankee Stadium, Bronx, New York City, New York, U.S.	Lost NYSAC, NBA, and The Ring lightweight titles
147	Win	124–9–13 (1)	Izzy Kline	KO	3 (10)	Jun 17, 1930	26 years, 132 days	Prudden Auditorium, Lansing, Michigan, U.S.	
146	Draw	123–9–13 (1)	Tommy Grogan	PTS	10	May 9, 1930	26 years, 93 days	Ak-sar-ben Coliseum, Omaha, Nebraska, U.S.	
145	Win	123–9–12 (1)	Pee Wee Jarrell	PTS	10	Apr 30, 1930	26 years, 84 days	Armory, Grand Rapids, Michigan, U.S.	
144	Loss	122–9–12 (1)	Jimmy McLarnin	UD	10	Mar 1, 1930	26 years, 24 days	Chicago Stadium, Chicago, Illinois, U.S.	
143	Win	122–8–12 (1)	Joey Goodman	PTS	12	Feb 3, 1930	25 years, 363 days	Public Hall, Cleveland, Ohio, U.S.	
142	Draw	121–8–12 (1)	Manuel Quintero	PTS	10	Jan 15, 1930	25 years, 344 days	Carter's Arena, Miami Beach, Florida, U.S.	
141	Win	121–8–11 (1)	Herman Perlick	PTS	10	Dec 13, 1929	25 years, 311 days	Grand Rapids, Michigan, U.S.	
140	Win	120–8–11 (1)	Joe Azzarella	KO	2 (8)	Nov 21, 1929	25 years, 289 days	Arcadia Ballroom, Milwaukee, Wisconsin, U.S.	
139	Loss	119–8–11 (1)	Jimmy McLarnin	SD	10	Nov 4, 1929	25 years, 272 days	Chicago Stadium, Chicago, Illinois, U.S.	
138	Win	119–7–11 (1)	Ray Kiser	NWS	8	Sep 23, 1929	25 years, 230 days	Memphis, Tennessee, U.S.	
137	Win	118–7–11 (1)	Luis Vicentini	PTS	10	Sep 6, 1929	25 years, 213 days	Chicago Stadium, Chicago, Illinois, U.S.	
136	Win	117–7–11 (1)	Frankie Frisco	TKO	3 (10)	Aug 28, 1929	25 years, 204 days	Petoskey, Illinois, U.S.	
135	Win	116–7–11 (1)	Tony Canzoneri	SD	10	Aug 2, 1929	25 years, 178 days	Chicago Stadium, Chicago, Illinois, U.S.	Retained NYSAC, NBA, and The Ring lightweight titles
134	Win	115–7–11 (1)	Tony Lombardo	PTS	10	Jun 20, 1929	25 years, 135 days	Jackson County Farigrounds, Jackson, Michigan, U.S.	
133	Win	114–7–11 (1)	Jackie Nichols	TKO	7 (10)	Jun 7, 1929	25 years, 122 days	Marsh Field, Muskegon, Michigan, U.S.	
132	Win	113–7–11 (1)	Frankie Nelson	PTS	10	Apr 25, 1929	25 years, 79 days	Prudden Auditorium, Lansing, Michigan, U.S.	
131	Win	112–7–11 (1)	Benny Duke	PTS	10	Apr 12, 1929	25 years, 66 days	Grand Rapids, Michigan, U.S.	
130	Win	111–7–11 (1)	Don Davis	PTS	10	Feb 4, 1929	24 years, 365 days	Peoria, Illinois, U.S.	
129	Win	110–7–11 (1)	Jack Gillespie	NWS	10	Jan 22, 1929	24 years, 352 days	Armory, Indianapolis, Indiana, U.S.	
128	Loss	109–7–11 (1)	Jimmy Goodrich	TKO	2 (10)	Sep 25, 1928	24 years, 233 days	Athletic Park, Flint, Michigan, U.S.	
127	Win	109–6–11 (1)	Johnny O'Donnell	TKO	8 (10)	Aug 14, 1928	24 years, 191 days	Janesville, Wisconsin, U.S.	
126	Win	108–6–11 (1)	Jimmy McLarnin	UD	15	May 21, 1928	24 years, 106 days	Polo Grounds, Manhattan, New York City, New York, U.S.	Retained NYSAC, NBA, and The Ring lightweight titles
125	Win	107–6–11 (1)	Eddie Wagner	PTS	10	Apr 17, 1928	24 years, 72 days	Olympia Stadium, Detroit, Michigan, U.S.	
124	Win	106–6–11 (1)	Jackie Fields	UD	10	Feb 23, 1928	24 years, 18 days	Coliseum, Chicago, Illinois, U.S.	
123	Win	105–6–11 (1)	Billy Petrolle	NWS	10	Jan 13, 1928	23 years, 342 days	Auditorium, Minneapolis, Minnesota, U.S.	
122	Win	104–6–11 (1)	Johnny O'Donnell	NWS	10	Dec 16, 1927	23 years, 314 days	Municipal Auditorium, Minneapolis, Minnesota, U.S.	
121	Win	103–6–11 (1)	Jimmy Sacco	PTS	10	Dec 9, 1927	23 years, 307 days	Mechanics Building, Boston, Massachusetts, U.S.	
120	Win	102–6–11 (1)	Babe Ruth	PTS	10	Nov 23, 1927	23 years, 291 days	108th Field Artillery Armory, Philadelphia, Pennsylvania, U.S.	Not to be confused with Babe Ruth
119	Win	101–6–11 (1)	Spug Myers	PTS	10	Nov 15, 1927	23 years, 283 days	Coliseum, Chicago, Illinois, U.S.	
118	Win	100–6–11 (1)	Wildcat Monte	KO	3 (10)	Oct 24, 1927	23 years, 261 days	Tulsa, Oklahoma, U.S.	
117	Win	99–6–11 (1)	Joe Trabon	NWS	10	Oct 11, 1927	23 years, 248 days	Convention Hall, Kansas City, Kansas, U.S.	
116	Win	98–6–11 (1)	Midget Guery	NWS	10	Sep 5, 1927	23 years, 212 days	Tacoma Bowl, Dayton, Ohio, U.S.	
115	Win	97–6–11 (1)	Phil McGraw	PTS	10	Jul 16, 1927	23 years, 161 days	University of Detroit Stadium, Detroit, Michigan, U.S.	Retained NYSAC, NBA, and The Ring lightweight titles
114	Win	96–6–11 (1)	Steve Adams	KO	2 (10)	Jun 1, 1927	23 years, 116 days	Memorial Hall, Kansas City, Kansas, U.S.	Adams died of injuries sustained from the fight
113	Win	95–6–11 (1)	Johnny Valdez	KO	2 (10)	Apr 11, 1927	23 years, 65 days	Armory, Tucson, Arizona, U.S.	
112	Loss	94–6–11 (1)	Jackie Fields	NWS	10	Apr 4, 1927	23 years, 58 days	Wrigley Field, Los Angeles, California, U.S.	
111	Win	94–5–11 (1)	Tommy White	NWS	10	Mar 25, 1927	23 years, 48 days	Gardner Park Arena, Dallas, Texas, U.S.	
110	Win	93–5–11 (1)	Armand Schaekels	PTS	10	Jan 31, 1927	22 years, 360 days	Benjamin Field Arena, Tampa, Florida, U.S.	
109	Win	92–5–11 (1)	Eddie Dwyer	NWS	10	Jan 14, 1927	22 years, 343 days	Forum, Wichita, Kansas, U.S.	
108	Win	91–5–11 (1)	Jimmy Lanning	NWS	10	Jan 10, 1927	22 years, 339 days	Pittsburg, Kansas, U.S.	
107	Win	90–5–11 (1)	Roy Moore	KO	6 (12)	Nov 15, 1926	22 years, 283 days	Jefferson County Armory, Louisville, Kentucky, U.S.	
106	Win	89–5–11 (1)	Jack Duffy	NWS	12	Nov 12, 1926	22 years, 280 days	Armory, Toledo, Ohio, U.S.	
105	Win	88–5–11 (1)	Clausine Vincent	NWS	10	Oct 29, 1926	22 years, 266 days	Coliseum, Oklahoma City, Oklahoma, U.S.	NYSAC, NBA, and The Ring lightweight titles at stake; (via KO only)
104	Win	87–5–11 (1)	Larry Cappo	NWS	10	Oct 20, 1926	22 years, 257 days	Memorial Hall, Kansas City, Kansas, U.S.	
103	Win	86–5–11 (1)	Joe Jawson	NWS	10	Oct 8, 1926	22 years, 245 days	Harlem Park, Rockford, Illinois, U.S.	NYSAC, NBA, and The Ring lightweight titles at stake; (via KO only)
102	Win	85–5–11 (1)	Rocky Kansas	PTS	10	Jul 3, 1926	22 years, 148 days	Comiskey Park, Chicago, Illinois, U.S.	Won NYSAC, NBA, and The Ring lightweight titles
101	Win	84–5–11 (1)	Sidney Glick	TKO	2 (10)	May 7, 1926	22 years, 91 days	Legion Stadium, Hollywood, California, U.S.	
100	Win	83–5–11 (1)	Charlie Feraci	PTS	10	Apr 30, 1926	22 years, 84 days	Coliseum, San Diego, California, U.S.	
99	Win	82–5–11 (1)	Harry 'Kid' Brown	NWS	10	Apr 9, 1926	22 years, 63 days	East Chicago, Indiana, U.S.	
98	Win	81–5–11 (1)	Teddy O'Hara	PTS	10	Feb 16, 1926	22 years, 11 days	Arena, Vernon, California, U.S.	
97	Win	80–5–11 (1)	Johnny Adams	PTS	10	Feb 5, 1926	22 years, 0 days	Legion Stadium, Hollywood, California, U.S.	
96	Win	79–5–11 (1)	Jack Sparr	PTS	10	Jan 27, 1926	21 years, 356 days	Wilmington Bowl, Wilmington, California, U.S.	
95	Win	78–5–11 (1)	Babe Picato	TKO	7 (10)	Jan 22, 1926	21 years, 351 days	Bakersfield Arena, Bakersfield, California, U.S.	
94	Win	77–5–11 (1)	Teddy O'Hara	PTS	10	Jan 15, 1926	21 years, 344 days	Legion Stadium, Hollywood, California, U.S.	
93	Win	76–5–11 (1)	Jimmy Cashill	NWS	10	Dec 7, 1925	21 years, 305 days	Peoria, Illinois, U.S.	
92	Draw	75–5–11 (1)	Phil McGraw	PTS	12	Oct 12, 1925	21 years, 249 days	Windsor Arena, Windsor, Ontario, Canada	
91	Win	75–5–10 (1)	Eddie Raynor	TKO	4 (10)	Sep 17, 1925	21 years, 224 days	Armory, Champaign, Illinois, U.S.	
90	Win	74–5–10 (1)	Bobby Ward	PTS	10	Aug 31, 1925	21 years, 207 days	Jefferson Barracks Amphitheater, Lemay, Missouri, U.S.	
89	Win	73–5–10 (1)	Solly Seeman	PTS	10	Aug 25, 1925	21 years, 201 days	Coney Island Stadium, Brooklyn, New York City, New York, U.S.	
88	Win	72–5–10 (1)	Sid Barbarian	UD	10	Aug 17, 1925	21 years, 193 days	Fairgrounds Coliseum, Detroit, Michigan, U.S.	
87	Win	71–5–10 (1)	Frankie Burns	NWS	10	Aug 6, 1925	21 years, 182 days	Madison, Wisconsin, U.S.	
86	Win	70–5–10 (1)	Solly Seeman	NWS	10	Jul 17, 1925	21 years, 162 days	East Chicago, Indiana, U.S.	
85	Win	69–5–10 (1)	Phil Salvadore	PTS	10	Jun 6, 1925	21 years, 121 days	Ascot Park, Los Angeles, California, U.S.	
84	Loss	68–5–10 (1)	Jimmy Goodrich	DQ	6 (10)	May 18, 1925	21 years, 102 days	Queensboro Stadium, Long Island City, Queens, New York City, New York, U.S.	
83	Win	68–4–10 (1)	Joe Azzarella	NWS	10	Apr 20, 1925	21 years, 74 days	Janesville, Wisconsin, U.S.	
82	Win	67–4–10 (1)	Joe Sieloff	NWS	10	Apr 3, 1925	21 years, 57 days	Madison, Wisconsin, U.S.	
81	Win	66–4–10 (1)	Sid Terris	PTS	12	Feb 6, 1925	21 years, 1 day	Madison Square Garden, Manhattan, New York City, New York, U.S.	
80	Win	65–4–10 (1)	Charlie Feraci	RTD	5 (10)	Jan 12, 1925	20 years, 342 days	Memphis, Tennessee, U.S.	
79	Win	64–4–10 (1)	Jack Bernstein	PTS	12	Nov 7, 1924	20 years, 276 days	Madison Square Garden, Manhattan, New York City, New York, U.S.	
78	Loss	63–4–10 (1)	Phil Salvadore	PTS	4	Oct 7, 1924	20 years, 245 days	Arena, Vernon, California, U.S.	
77	Win	63–3–10 (1)	Johnny Adams	PTS	4	Sep 30, 1924	20 years, 238 days	Arena, Vernon, California, U.S.	
76	Win	62–3–10 (1)	Oakland Frankie Burns	PTS	4	Sep 26, 1924	20 years, 234 days	Legion Stadium, Hollywood, California, U.S.	
75	Win	61–3–10 (1)	Billy Wallace	UD	4	Sep 24, 1924	20 years, 232 days	Auditorium, Oakland, California, U.S.	
74	Win	60–3–10 (1)	Dick Hoppe	UD	4	Sep 12, 1924	20 years, 220 days	Legion Stadium, Hollywood, California, U.S.	
73	Draw	59–3–10 (1)	Archie Walker	NWS	10	Aug 18, 1924	20 years, 191 days	Olympic Arena, Brooklyn, New York City, New York, U.S.	
72	Win	59–3–9 (1)	Eddie Wagner	NWS	12	Aug 14, 1924	20 years, 191 days	Idora Park, Youngstown, Ohio, U.S.	
71	Win	58–3–9 (1)	Joe Azzarella	NWS	10	Jul 18, 1924	20 years, 164 days	Open-air Arena, East Chicago, Indiana, U.S.	
70	Win	57–3–9 (1)	Johnny Dundee	NWS	10	Jun 9, 1924	20 years, 125 days	Open-air Arena, East Chicago, Indiana, U.S.	
69	Win	56–3–9 (1)	Paul Fritsch	NWS	8	May 31, 1924	20 years, 116 days	Floyd Fitzsimmons' Arena, Michigan City, Indiana, U.S.	
68	Win	55–3–9 (1)	Jack Bernstein	NWS	12	May 16, 1924	20 years, 101 days	Jefferson County Armory, Louisville, Kentucky, U.S.	
67	Win	54–3–9 (1)	Billy Henry	NWS	10	Apr 21, 1924	20 years, 76 days	East Chicago, Indiana, U.S.	
66	Win	53–3–9 (1)	Mickey O'Dowd	NWS	10	Mar 24, 1924	20 years, 48 days	East Chicago, Indiana, U.S.	
65	Draw	52–3–9 (1)	Jack Bernstein	PTS	15	Jan 11, 1924	19 years, 340 days	Madison Square Garden, Manhattan, New York City, New York, U.S.	
64	Draw	52–3–8 (1)	Sid Terris	PTS	10	Dec 17, 1923	19 years, 315 days	Madison Square Garden, Manhattan, New York City, New York, U.S.	
63	Win	52–3–7 (1)	Eddie Brady	NWS	10	Dec 3, 1923	19 years, 301 days	East Chicago, Indiana, U.S.	
62	Win	51–3–7 (1)	Babe Herman	PTS	12	Nov 13, 1923	19 years, 281 days	Pioneer Sporting Club, Manhattan, New York City, New York, U.S.	
61	Win	50–3–7 (1)	Harry 'Kid' Brown	PTS	12	Oct 26, 1923	19 years, 263 days	Madison Square Garden, Manhattan, New York City, New York, U.S.	
60	Win	49–3–7 (1)	Eddie Wagner	NWS	10	Oct 5, 1923	19 years, 242 days	Mullen-Sager Arena, Aurora, Illinois, U.S.	
59	Win	48–3–7 (1)	Joe Fox	NWS	10	Sep 17, 1923	19 years, 224 days	Tomlinson Hall, Indianapolis, Indiana, U.S.	
58	Draw	47–3–7 (1)	Louis Margolis	NWS	10	Aug 28, 1923	19 years, 204 days	Riverside Arena, Covington, Kentucky, U.S.	
57	Win	47–3–6 (1)	Harry Kabakoff	NWS	10	Aug 24, 1923	19 years, 200 days	Mullen-Sager Arena, Aurora, Illinois, U.S.	
56	Win	46–3–6 (1)	Frankie Frisco	NWS	8	Jul 31, 1923	19 years, 176 days	Mullen-Sager Arena, Aurora, Illinois, U.S.	
55	Win	45–3–6 (1)	Sailor Larsen	NWS	10	Jul 23, 1923	19 years, 168 days	Three Eyes Ballpark, Peoria, Illinois, U.S.	
54	Win	44–3–6 (1)	Battling Harry Leonard	TKO	4 (10)	Jun 26, 1923	19 years, 141 days	East Chicago, Indiana, U.S.	
53	Win	43–3–6 (1)	George Butch	NWS	8	Jun 21, 1923	19 years, 136 days	Mullen-Sager Arena, Aurora, Illinois, U.S.	
52	Win	42–3–6 (1)	Jack "Kid" Wolfe	PTS	12	Jun 13, 1923	19 years, 128 days	Elmwood Arena, Elmwood Place, Ohio, U.S.	
51	Win	41–3–6 (1)	Johnny Mahoney	KO	5 (10)	May 31, 1923	19 years, 115 days	Waterloo Theatre, Waterloo, Iowa, U.S.	
50	Win	40–3–6 (1)	Frankie Garcia	NWS	8	May 29, 1923	19 years, 113 days	Dexter Park Pavilion, Chicago, Illinois, U.S.	
49	Win	39–3–6 (1)	Eddie Walsh	TKO	2 (6)	May 21, 1923	19 years, 105 days	Ashland Blvd. Auditorium, Chicago, Illinois, U.S.	
48	Win	38–3–6 (1)	Johnny Lisse	TKO	6 (8)	Apr 24, 1923	19 years, 78 days	Dexter Park Pavilion, Chicago, Illinois, U.S.	
47	Loss	37–3–6 (1)	Joey Sangor	TKO	7 (10)	Mar 9, 1923	19 years, 32 days	Kenwood Armory, Minneapolis, Minnesota, U.S.	
46	Draw	37–2–6 (1)	Cowboy Eddie Anderson	PTS	10	Feb 15, 1923	19 years, 10 days	Armory, Minneapolis, Minnesota, U.S.	
45	Loss	37–2–5 (1)	Frankie Garcia	PTS	10	Feb 9, 1923	19 years, 4 days	U.S.S. Commodore, Lake Michigan, U.S.	
44	Win	37–1–5 (1)	Stewart McLean	NWS	10	Feb 1, 1923	18 years, 361 days	Kenwood Armory, Minneapolis, Minnesota, U.S.	
43	Win	36–1–5 (1)	Frankie Howell	KO	5 (8)	Dec 19, 1922	18 years, 317 days	United States of America	
42	Win	35–1–5 (1)	Harvey Bright	PTS	10	Dec 11, 1922	18 years, 309 days	Madison Square Garden, Manhattan, New York City, New York, U.S.	
41	Win	34–1–5 (1)	Sammy Frager	TKO	6 (8)	Nov 27, 1922	18 years, 295 days	Memphis, Tennessee, U.S.	
40	Win	33–1–5 (1)	Joey Sangor	NWS	10	Nov 20, 1922	18 years, 288 days	Castle Ice Gardens, Milwaukee, Wisconsin, U.S.	
39	Win	32–1–5 (1)	Jack "Kid" Wolfe	NWS	10	Oct 30, 1922	18 years, 267 days	Kenosha, Wisconsin, U.S.	
38	Win	31–1–5 (1)	Johnny McCoy	PTS	8	Aug 7, 1922	18 years, 183 days	Southern A.C., Memphis, Tennessee, U.S.	
37	Draw	30–1–5 (1)	Memphis Pal Moore	NWS	8	Jul 4, 1922	18 years, 149 days	Russwood Park, Memphis, Tennessee, U.S.	
36	Loss	30–1–4 (1)	Cowboy Eddie Anderson	NWS	10	Jun 26, 1922	18 years, 141 days	Moline, Illinois, U.S.	
35	Win	30–0–4 (1)	Marty Henderson	NWS	10	Jun 5, 1922	18 years, 120 days	Rockford, Illinois, U.S.	
34	Win	29–0–4 (1)	Joe Burman	NWS	10	May 29, 1922	18 years, 113 days	Mullen-Sager Arena, Aurora, Illinois, U.S.	
33	Win	28–0–4 (1)	George Spencer	DQ	5 (12)	Apr 7, 1922	18 years, 61 days	U.S.S. Commodore, Lake Michigan, U.S.	
32	Win	27–0–4 (1)	Whitey Ross	NWS	10	Mar 16, 1922	18 years, 39 days	La Salle, Illinois, U.S.	
31	Win	26–0–4 (1)	Frankie Garcia	PTS	8	Feb 13, 1922	18 years, 8 days	Memphis, Tennessee, U.S.	
30	Win	25–0–4 (1)	Eddie Ketchell	NWS	10	Jan 23, 1922	17 years, 352 days	K of C Hall, Terre Haute, Indiana, U.S.	
29	Win	24–0–4 (1)	Jack Eile	PTS	10	Jan 13, 1922	17 years, 342 days	U.S.S. Commodore, Lake Michigan, U.S.	
28	Win	23–0–4 (1)	Sammy Frager	TKO	4 (10)	Dec 5, 1921	17 years, 303 days	Omaha, Nebraska, U.S.	
27	Win	22–0–4 (1)	Jack Eile	PTS	10	Nov 29, 1921	17 years, 297 days	Chicago, Illinois, U.S.	
26	Win	21–0–4 (1)	Barney Doolan	KO	3 (?)	Nov 3, 1921	17 years, 271 days	Chicago, Illinois, U.S.	
25	Win	20–0–4 (1)	Joe Miller	NWS	10	Oct 7, 1921	17 years, 244 days	Auditorium, Cedar Rapids, Iowa, U.S.	
24	Draw	19–0–4 (1)	Young Farrell	NWS	8	Sep 5, 1921	17 years, 212 days	Sager's Arena, Aurora, Illinois, U.S.	
23	Win	19–0–3 (1)	Memphis Pal Moore	NWS	10	Aug 26, 1921	17 years, 202 days	Sager's Arena, Aurora, Illinois, U.S.	
22	Win	18–0–3 (1)	Willie Green	NWS	10	Aug 17, 1921	17 years, 193 days	Camp Grant arena, Rockford, Illinois, U.S.	
21	Draw	17–0–3 (1)	Babe Asher	NWS	10	Jul 15, 1921	17 years, 160 days	Sager's Arena, Aurora, Illinois, U.S.	
20	Win	17–0–2 (1)	Stanley Everett	NWS	10	Jul 1, 1921	17 years, 146 days	Pekin, Illinois, U.S.	
19	Win	16–0–2 (1)	Mike Eulo	TKO	1 (10)	Jun 28, 1921	17 years, 143 days	Twin City A.C., East Chicago, Indiana, U.S.	
18	Win	15–0–2 (1)	Johnny Gannon	NWS	10	Jun 9, 1921	17 years, 124 days	Camp Grant arena, Rockford, Illinois, U.S.	
17	NC	14–0–2 (1)	Johnny Gannon	NC	5 (10)	May 18, 1921	17 years, 102 days	Liberty Theater, Camp Grant, Illinois, U.S.	Gannon hit low and could not continue Physician's exam later determined the fight could have continued
16	Win	14–0–2	Johnny Hagen	NWS	10	Mar 16, 1921	17 years, 39 days	Elk's Lodge, Janesville, Wisconsin, U.S.	
15	Win	13–0–2	Jockey Joe Dillon	NWS	8	Jan 1, 1921	16 years, 331 days	Auditorium, Milwaukee, Wisconsin, U.S.	
14	Win	12–0–2	Barney Doolan	NWS	10	Oct 5, 1920	16 years, 243 days	Kenosha, Wisconsin, U.S.	
13	Draw	11–0–2	Kid Flannery	NWS	10	Sep 6, 1920	16 years, 214 days	Camp Grant arena, Rockford, Illinois, U.S.	
12	Win	11–0–1	Barney Doolan	NWS	10	Aug 28, 1920	16 years, 205 days	East Chicago, Indiana, U.S.	
11	Win	10–0–1	Frankie Izzo	NWS	10	Aug 14, 1920	16 years, 191 days	East Chicago, Indiana, U.S.	
10	Win	9–0–1	Eddie Corbett	TKO	5 (6)	Aug 5, 1920	16 years, 182 days	American Legion, Belvidere, Illinois, U.S.	
9	Win	8–0–1	Johnny Gannon	NWS	8	Jul 28, 1920	16 years, 174 days	Camp Grant arena, Rockford, Illinois, U.S.	
8	Win	7–0–1	Kid Unger	KO	3 (6)	May 31, 1920	16 years, 116 days	Camp Grant arena, Rockford, Illinois, U.S.	
7	Win	6–0–1	Johnny Gannon	TKO	3 (6)	Apr 21, 1920	16 years, 76 days	Liberty Theater, Camp Grant, Illinois, U.S.	
6	Win	5–0–1	Johnny Hagerman	KO	3 (?)	Apr 7, 1920	16 years, 62 days	Camp Grant, Illinois, U.S.	
5	Win	4–0–1	Benny Shapiro	PTS	8	Feb 5, 1920	16 years, 0 days	Saint Louis, Missouri, U.S.	
4	Win	3–0–1	Eddie Hagerman	TKO	4 (6)	Jan 29, 1920	15 years, 358 days	Temple Theatre, Alton, Illinois, U.S.	
3	Win	2–0–1	Stubby Sandy	NWS	4	Nov 12, 1919	15 years, 280 days	Liberty Theater, Camp Grant, Illinois, U.S.	
2	Win	1–0–1	Stubby Sandy	NWS	4	Sep 13, 1919	15 years, 220 days	Quincy, Illinois, U.S.	
1	Draw	0–0–1	Clifford Lobdell	PTS	4	Jul 23, 1919	15 years, 168 days	Camp Grant arena, Rockford, Illinois, U.S.	

== Titles in boxing ==
=== Major world titles ===
- NYSAC lightweight champion (135 lbs)
- NBA (WBA) lightweight champion (135 lbs)

=== The Ring magazine titles ===
- The Ring lightweight champion (135 lbs)

=== Undisputed titles ===
- Undisputed lightweight champion

== See also ==
- Lineal championship
- List of lightweight boxing champions

== Notes ==
Achievements
Preceded by Rocky Kansas	World Lightweight Champion; July 3, 1926 – July 17, 1930	Succeeded by Al Singer
