= Tiozzo =

Tiozzo is a surname. Notable people with the surname include:

- Christophe Tiozzo (born 1963), French boxer
- Fabrice Tiozzo (born 1969), French boxer, brother of Christophe
- Leonardo Tiozzo (born 1994), Italian dressage rider
- Lucio Tiozzo (born 1956), Italian politician

== See also ==
- Tozzo (disambiguation)
