= Solly Seeman =

Personal information
- Nationality: American (United States)
- Born: Shulim Seeman; February 26, 1902 Lemberg, Austria-Hungary (now Lviv, Ukraine)
- Died: March 11, 1989 (aged 87) Miami Beach, Florida
- Weight: Lightweight

Boxing career
- Stance: Orthodox

Boxing record
- Total fights: 81
- Wins: 53
- Win by KO: 10
- Losses: 13
- Draws: 13
- No contests: 2

Solomon Frederick "Solly" Seeman (February 26, 1902 – March 11, 1989) was the 1920 AAU National Featherweight Amateur Champion. He was a legitimate contender for the Lightweight Champion of the World during March and April 1925, when he won the first two rounds of the NYSAC World Lightweight Elimination tournament. Ring Magazine rated him fifth among World Lightweight Contenders in 1925.

Seeman took the Pacific Coast Lightweight Championship in 1922, and the Pacific Coast Jr. Lightweight Championship in 1923.

== Early life, and amateur boxing career ==
Solly Seeman was born on February 26, 1902, in Lemberg, Austria-Hungary (now Lviv, Ukraine). In 1908, his father Solomon, after serving in the Austrian army, moved his wife and six year old Solly to New York's Lower East Side. Seeman grew up one of six children. When his family moved to Yorktown, he began regular supervised boxing training at the YMCA on 92nd Street. From his earliest years he showed a rare balance of speed, cleverness, and a solid punch. As the Milwaukee Sentinel later noted, Seeman "displayed a shifty style, a world of speed, and a punishing right hand."

At only seventeen, the gifted redhead won both the Metropolitan and State Flyweight Amateur Championships, than defeated William Parker in Boston for the Amateur Featherweight National Title. Though qualifying for the Olympic Trials in 1920, he chose instead to begin his professional career in order to earn money for his sister and father who were suffering from TB, a common ailment in the New York ghetto.

== Boxing career ==
Fighting as a featherweight in his professional debut on February 25, 1919, he aggressively won over veteran boxer Bobby Dobbs in the Manhattan Casino on November 29, 1921. In his first year of boxing he beat featherweight title contender Willie Davis in November 1921 in the Bronx, as well as Sammy Vogel. He beat Mickey Brown twice in March and April 1921, with the March fight actually being given to Seeman a week later in a reversal by New York Boxing Commission, according to the New York Times.

According to boxing writer Ken Blady, Seeman won the Pacific Coast Jr. Lightweight Title by beating Eddie Duggins in San Francisco in 1922 and the Pacific Coast Lightweight title by beating Benny Vierra in San Francisco, in 1923.

He lost to the previous Jr. Lightweight Champion Jack Bernstein on July 8, 1922.

=== Attempt at lightweight championship ===
In the only chance he was given in a sanctioned Lightweight World Title Competition, Seeman first defeated Frankie LaFay on February 27, 1925, in the first round of an elimination tournament. He then defeated Charlie O'Connell in a fifteen-round bout in Madison Square Garden on March 9, before seven thousand fans, who cheered his victory at the end of the close bout.

On April 24, in the semi-final bout of the tournament, he knocked out Larry Regan in the third round in New Brunswick, New Jersey. Winning by a knockout in a critical bout showed Seeman's ability to deliver a strong punch even against a quality competitor with defensive skills. He may have overtrained for his final tournament bout with French boxer Benny Valgar, and lost in a close ten-round decision in Queensboro Stadium on May 18, 1925.

== Career after lightweight championship tournament ==
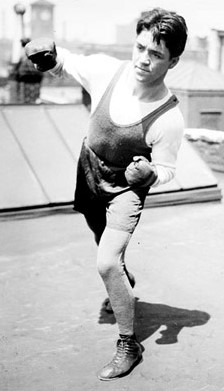
Sammy Mandell World Lightweight Champion July 1926 – July 1930

On July 17, 1925, Seeman fought 1926-30 lightweight champion Sammy Mandell in a classic bout in East Chicago, Indiana. Seeman knocked down Mandell in the first round, and according to many at ringside, he had the better of the match. But for some reason, Seeman was unable to close the match for a newspaper decision. In a return bout with Mandell at Coney Island on August 25, Seeman lost on points in ten rounds.

Seeman rightfully continued to be viewed as a top contender. According to boxing author Ken Blady, shortly after Rocky Kansas defeated Jimmy Goodrich for the Lightweight Championship, Seeman offered his entire purse to charity if Kansas would meet him in a title bout. Unable to arrange the title shot with Kansas, Seeman took on ex-Lightweight Champion, Jimmy Goodrich on January 26, 1926, in Milwaukee and decisively won the ten-round newspaper decision. The Milwaukee Journal praised Goodrich's superior defensive skills and summarized the fight when they wrote, "Seeman's cleverness helped him to hold command throughout." They also observed that "Goodrich shot at a bounding target that moved inside the punches or stepped outside of their path entirely." Seeman had beaten another lightweight champion, but was unable to time his victory to take the title. After Mandell took the title from Kansas, Seeman again attempted to obtain a title shot, but was denied.

From 1926 to 1929, Seeman continued to box, but was discouraged by his inability to obtain a title shot considering his rating and previous successes. He won a bout with Young Leonard by second-round TKO in the Garden on March 26, 1926, but his dominance in the Lightweight division began to fade afterward. He defeated Pete Petrolle in Newark decisively on March 14, 1927, but lost to his previous opponent from the Lightweight Championship Tournament, Charlie O'Connell on March 22, 1927.

== Life after boxing ==
Seeman retired around 1929, only a few years after his peak performances.

He married Rose Gerwitz around 1930. With his ring winnings, he opened a laundromat in New York and later a successful printing and letterhead company in Long Island, New York. He provided training to a few gifted boxers, and in 1939 served as athletic director of the New York World's Fair.

Seeman received the Luke Bauer Humanitarian Award on June 19, 1976. In 1978, he was named outstanding Veteran Boxer of the Year. He lived in Miami Beach in his retirement, and died there on March 11, 1989. He left two sons.
