= Hombres de esta tierra =

1922 film

- Directed by: Carlos F. Borcosque
- Written by: Carlos F. Borcosque
- Cinematography: Andrés Martorell De Llanza
- Edited by: Vicente Castagno
- Production company: Estudios Cinematograficos Borcosque
- Release date: 19 January 1922
- Country: Chile
- Language: Silent

Hombres de esta tierra is a 1922 Chilean silent film, the debut film of Carlos F. Borcosque. It features boxer Luis Vicentini, Jorge Infante, Ketty Zambelli, and Alfredo Rondanelli.

== Cast ==
- Luis Vicentini
- Jorge Infante
- Ketty Zambelli
- Alfredo Rondanelli
- Eugenio Matte Hurtado
- César Olivos Prado
- Fernando Corres
