= Frager =

Frager is a surname. Notable people with the surname include:

- Henri Frager (1897–1944), member of the French Resistance during World War II
- Malcolm Frager (1935–1991), American piano virtuoso and recording artist
- Robert Frager (born 1940), American social psychologist
- Sammy Frager, Romanian boxer and boxing glove manufacturer
- Tom Frager (born 1977), French songwriter and performer
