= Crialese =

Crialese is an Italian surname. Notable people with the surname include:

- Carlo Crialese (born 1992), Italian footballer
- Emanuele Crialese (born 1965), Italian screenwriter and film director
