= Ernesto Starita =

Italian footballer (born 1996)

Personal information
- Date of birth: 3 March 1996 (age 30)
- Place of birth: Naples, Italy
- Height: 1.78 m (5 ft 10 in)
- Position: Forward

Team information
- Current team: Sorrento
- Number: 7

Youth career
- –2014: Padova

Senior career*
Years	Team	Apps	(Gls)
2014–2017	Pro Vercelli	6	(0)
2015–2016	→ Pisa (loan)	10	(1)
2016–2017	→ Fidelis Andria (loan)	4	(0)
2017–2018	Cesena	0	(0)
2017–2018	→ Pro Piacenza (loan)	14	(3)
2018–2019	Bisceglie	38	(5)
2019–2020	Casertana	30	(10)
2020–2024	Monopoli	123	(36)
2024–2026	Benevento	44	(2)
2025–2026	→ Torres (loan)	14	(2)
2026	→ Guidonia (loan)	17	(0)
2026–	Sorrento	0	(0)
- * Club domestic league appearances and goals as of 26 April 2026

Ernesto Starita (born 3 March 1996) is an Italian professional footballer who plays as a forward for Serie C Group C club Sorrento.

== Career ==
He made his professional debut in the Lega Pro for Pisa on 6 September 2015 in a game against Prato.

In July 2017 Starita joined Cesena, with Carlo Crialese moved to opposite direction. Starita was immediately left for Pro Piacenza. He made his club debut on 16 July, a friendly match.

On 3 July 2019, he moved to Casertana.

On 27 August 2020 he moved to Monopoli.

On 14 January 2024 he moved permanently to Benevento, signing a 3 1/2-year contract, until June 2027.
