= Tozzi =

Tozzi is an Italian surname. It may refer to:

- Antonio Tozzi (1736-1812), Italian composer
- Bruno Tozzi (1656-1743), Italian monk and botanist
- Claudio Tozzi (b. 1944), Brazilian artist
- Fausto Tozzi (1921–1978), Italian film actor and screenwriter
- Federigo Tozzi (1883-1920), Italian writer
- Gianni Tozzi (born 1962), Italian former athlete
- Gianpiero Tozzi (b. 1994), Italian footballer
- Giorgio Tozzi (1923-2011), American opera singer
- Humberto Tozzi (1934–1980), Brazilian international footballer
- Jim Tozzi (b. 1938), American lobbyist
- Jim Tozzi (PFFR) (b. 1967), American artist, commercial director, producer, voice actor, and musician
- John T. Tozzi, former rear admiral in the United States Coast Guard
- Mario Tozzi (1895–1979), Italian painter
- Nicoletta Tozzi (1966), former Italian female middle-distance runner
- Ricardo Tozzi (b. 1975), Brazilian actor
- Roberto Tozzi (b. 1958), Italian sprinter who specialized in the 400 metres
- Romano Tozzi Borsoi (b. 1979), Italian footballer
- Silvio Tozzi (1908–?), Italian wrestler
- Tahyna Tozzi (b. 1986), Australian model, singer, and actress
- Umberto Tozzi (b. 1952), Italian singer
