= Jorge Infante =

Chilean footballer

Personal information
- Full name: Jorge Hernán Infante Gálvez
- Date of birth: 1 August 1945 (age 81)
- Place of birth: Santiago, Chile
- Height: 1.85 m (6 ft 1 in)
- Position: Midfielder

Senior career*
| Years | Team | Apps | (Gls) |
| 1963 | Ferrobádminton | | |
| 1964 | América de Manta | | |
| 1964–1965 | Ferrobádminton | | |
| 1965–1966 | Veracruz | | |
| 1966–1967 | Pachuca | | |
| 1967–1968 | Unión Española | | |
| 1968 | Universidad Católica | | |
| 1969 | Palestino | 19 | (2) |
| 1970 | Antofagasta Portuario | 2 | (0) |
| 1971 | Universidad Católica | 5 | (1) |
| 1973–1974 | Union SG | | |
| 1974–1976 | Mulhouse | 49 | (10) |
| 1976–1977 | Toulouse | 6 | (0) |
| 1977–1978 | Arles | 4 | (0) |
| 1978–1979 | Épinal | 13 | (1) |
- * Club domestic league appearances and goals

Jorge Hernán Infante Gálvez (born 1 August 1945) is a Chilean former footballer who played as a midfielder for clubs in Chile and abroad.

== Career ==
Born in Santiago de Chile, Infante began his career with Ferrobádminton, the club after Bádminton FC, in 1963. He also played for them in 1965.

After stints with the Ecuadorian club América de Manta (1964), having trialled with Emelec, and the Mexican clubs Veracruz (1965–66) and Pachuca (1966–67), he returned to Chile and joined Unión Española thanks to the coach Andrés Prieto. Subsequently, he joined Universidad Católica under the coach Fernando Riera. He also trialled with Liga de Quito in 1968.

In his homeland, he after played for Palestino, Antofagasta Portuario and Universidad Católica again.

In 1973, he moved to Europe and trialled with Plus Ultra, Sevilla, Real Zaragoza and Anderlecht, playing alongside the Dutch international Robert Rensenbrink. He finally joined the Belgian club Union Saint-Gilloise in 1973.

In his last years, he played in the French Division 2 between 1974 and 1979 for Mulhouse, Toulouse, Arles and Épinal. In Mulhouse he coincided with the well-known French manager Arsène Wenger and was awarded as the best player of the division in 1976 by France Football.

Following his retirement, he graduated as a football manager in Spain.

== Personal life ==
Infante has alternately lived in both Santiago, Chile, and Valencia, Spain.
