= Sammy Frager =

Romanian-born boxing glove manufacturer

- Born: Sammy Frager; Constanța, Romania
- Died: April 19, 1966; Hines, Illinois, U.S.
- Occupation: Boxing glove manufacturer
- Years active: 1930s-1966
- Known for: Frager Boxing Gloves

Sammy Frager was a Romanian-born boxer and boxing glove manufacturer.

== Early life ==
Sammy Frager was born in Constanța, Constanța County, Romania, near the end of the 19th century.

Frager later immigrated to Chicago, Illinois with his family at age 4.

== Career ==
Sammy Frager debuted as an amateur boxer at 14 and posted a 60-0-1 record over five years in the Navy. He became Great Lakes A.A.U. featherweight boxing champion while at the Naval Training Station during World War I. After his Navy service, he started a business selling athletic trophies.

He began boxing professionally in the Windy City during the golden twenties. Frager became the sparring partner of Memphis Pal Moore and notably fought Sammy Mandell twice between 1921 and 1922. He was Sailor Friedman's sparring partner in preparation for a bout in Chicago with Benny Leonard, which was later called off.

Establishing his craft during the 1930s, Frager set up shop on W. Randolf St. and sold boxing equipment out of his headquarters at Trafton's Gym. He also made punching bags, shoes, bathrobes, trunks, and other athletic equipment.

Sammy Frager hand-crafted boxing gloves using traced outlines of the boxer's hand and stitched the leather himself on Singer sewing machines. It took him about six hours to make four gloves, which he initially stuffed with goat hair. Known for producing a perfect fit even through mail orders, Frager eventually adopted foam padding, evolving with the sport's standards. He rejected numerous buyout offers from major manufacturers.

In 1937, Sammy Frager began producing gloves for title fights. He was a familiar face at title bout signings, always bringing along a box of sample gloves to pitch his custom-made products. The first title bout to feature Frager gloves was Joe Louis vs. James J. Braddock. Frager made little profit from glove work, but making gloves for title fights helped promote Frager's gym-wear line. He started at $50 per pair and later charged $100, though he felt the time invested merited $250 to $500.

His gloves had been used at Chicago Stadium for 20 consecutive years until Jake LaMotta vs. Sugar Ray Robinson VI in 1951. The only time one of his gloves broke in the ring was during Johnny Saxton's March 1956 bout with Carmen Basilio.

Sonny Liston later became a regular customer of the hand-stitched workmanship from the Chicago boxing glove maker. To accommodate Liston's big thumbs, Frager took special measurements and customized the gloves accordingly. His brand was at the center of controversy during Liston's 1963 bout against Floyd Patterson. Liston wanted gloves tailored to fit his 14-inch fists manufactured by Frager, and Patterson's camp pushed to use Everlast gloves instead. At the request of Liston's advisor, Jack Nilon, Sammy created multiple sets of gloves in his small shop. While the Frager glove featured foam rubber, the Everlast version used hair padding. Liston, ordered to wear Everlast, said to Sammy, "They've got too many guns against you this time. But when I become champ, I'll be using your gloves."

For Sonny Liston vs. Cassius Clay in February 1964, Frager produced custom 8-oz sheepskin gloves. Ali, then known as Cassius Clay, wore the pair of gloves made by Frager and stopped Liston after seven rounds in Miami Beach. In the fall of 1964, Frager made custom 8-oz gloves for the rematch at a cost of $154, which were kept in a safe until fight night. Both fighters wore Frager gloves in their second appearance together in Lewiston, Maine, on May 25, 1965. Neil Leifer's famous photo of Ali standing over Liston features the gloves made by Frager.

At nearly 70, his last glove order—$200 for two pairs—was for the proposed March 29 Ali–Terrell fight. On February 8, 1966, the day contracts were approved, he began by tracing the fighters' hands and cutting high-quality sheepskin. The leather, tanned and dyed red, was stretched and padded using his "own brainstorm." He finished the gloves on a sewing machine, adding laces and the Frager label. The fight was postponed to the next year, but Sammy Frager died before it took place.

The former boxer spent more than three decades manufacturing boxing gloves. Over the years, Frager made gloves for fighters like Joe Louis, James J. Braddock, Tony Zale, Henry Armstrong, Max Baer, Barney Ross, Archie Moore, Tony Canzoneri, Rocky Marciano, Sugar Ray Robinson, and Carmen Basilio.

== Death ==
Sammy Frager died on April 19, 1966, at Hines Veterans Hospital in Hines, Illinois, United States.
