= Gianpiero Tozzi =

Italian footballer

Personal information
- Date of birth: 1 June 1994 (age 32)
- Place of birth: Rome, Italy
- Position: Forward

Team information
- Current team: Aprilia

Youth career
- –2013: Parma

Senior career*
Years	Team	Apps	(Gls)
2013–2014	Parma	0	(0)
2013	→ Foligno (loan)	4	(0)
2013–2014	→ Nocerina (loan)	0	(0)
2014	Lamezia	4	(0)
2014–	Aprilia	0	(0)
- * Club domestic league appearances and goals

Gianpiero Tozzi (born 1 June 1994) is an Italian footballer who plays for Italian Serie D club Aprilia.

== Biography ==
Born in Rome, capital of Italy, Tozzi started his career at Parma F.C. On 1 February 2013 he was signed by Foligno. In summer 2013, he left for Nocerina, along with Parma "team-mate" Carlo Crialese and Raffaele Rosato. After the club was expelled from the league, Tozzi was signed by Lamezia along with Giovanbattista Catalano on 23 January 2014.

In summer 2014 Tozzi left for Serie D club Aprilia.
