= Rocky Kansas =

American-Italian boxer

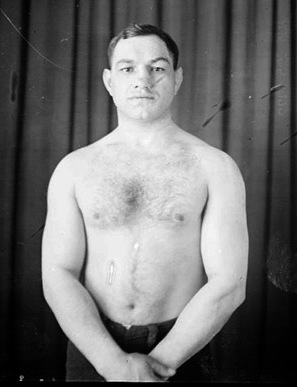

Personal information
- Nationality: American
- Born: Rocco Tozzo; April 21, 1893 Italy
- Died: January 10, 1954 (aged 60)
- Weight: lightweight

Boxing career
- Stance: Orthodox

Boxing record
- Total fights: 166
- Wins: 123
- Win by KO: 38
- Losses: 27
- Draws: 15
- No contests: 1

Rocky Kansas was an Italian-born American tough, short (5'2" tall) former Undisputed World Lightweight Champion boxer. He was born Rocco Tozzo on April 21, 1893, in Italy and came to America in 1898. Rocky Kansas was the brother of champion Joe "Kid" Kansas whom he combined with at an attempt to become a champion in 1938.

== Background ==
Rocky was the younger brother of Joe "Kid" Kansas (Tozzo), and older brother of boxer Tony Tozzo. Kansas and his two brothers combined to defeat 189 opponents in the Buffalo, New York area from 1909 to 1937. Father to Kenneth and Vincent Tozzo and husband to Jessie (Nye)Tozzo.

== Pro career ==
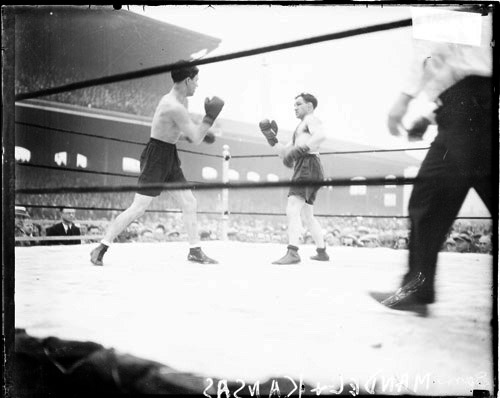
Kansas, (right) during his bout with Sammy Mandell

Kansas turned pro in 1911 and lost just two official decisions in his first 75 fights. In 1914, he faced his first contender, Johnny Dundee, losing a newspaper decision. Kansas also faced featherweight Champion Johnny Kilbane in a non-title match, but lost the newspaper decision.

During his career Kansas faced the cream of the featherweight and lightweight divisions. On February 28, 1916, Kansas fought the all-time great Benny Leonard. Although, Kansas managed to last the full 10 rounds for a No-Decision, he received a boxing lesson from Leonard.

In 1921 he met Richie Mitchell, a highly regarded Lightweight out of Milwaukee. In the first round Kansas pinned Mitchell against the ropes and knocked him out. Kansas then landed a non-title shot against Benny Leonard, but was again handily out boxed.

Kansas then came up with another upset victory, this time over southpaw Lew Tendler in a close 10-round decision. The victory landed him a title shot at Leonard's lightweight crown. In an exciting fight, Leonard was awarded the unanimous decision.

The two fought yet again. This time Leonard TKOed him in the eleventh round.

Leonard retired and Kansas was given his third title shot at Broadway Auditorium against Jimmy Goodrich, who claimed the title after Leonard's retirement. Kansas was able to get inside on Goodrich and won all but one of the first 13 rounds. Kansas was awarded the 15-round decision, and after over 14 years of professional fighting, Rocky Kansas was finally a champion.

His glory was short lived. On July 3, 1926, he defended against 22-year-old Sammy Mandell. Mandell outboxed Kansas to win the title.

== Retirement and death ==
Kansas retired after the loss. Like many others, he was wiped out in the Stock Market Crash of 1929. Kansas worked for the city of Buffalo in New York State. He had a job there for a few years. Then, in 1952, news got out about a cancer that he had developed. Kansas died on January 10, 1954, of cancer, following abdominal surgery. He was 60 years old.

== Professional boxing record ==
All information in this section is derived from BoxRec, unless otherwise stated.

=== Official record ===
166 fights	64 wins	11 losses
By knockout	38	3
By decision	26	7
By disqualification	0	1
Draws	6	
No contests	1	
Newspaper decisions/draws	84	

All newspaper decisions are officially regarded as “no decision” bouts and are not counted in the win/loss/draw column.

No.	Result	Record	Opponent	Type	Round	Date	Location	Notes
166	Loss	64–11–6 (85)	Joe Trippe	UD	6	Sep 30, 1932	Broadway Auditorium, Buffalo, New York, U.S.	
165	Loss	64–10–6 (85)	Sammy Mandell	PTS	10	Jul 3, 1926	Comiskey Park, Chicago, Illinois, U.S.	Lost NYSAC, NBA, and The Ring lightweight titles
164	Loss	64–9–6 (85)	Pal Moran	NWS	10	Apr 12, 1926	Coliseum Arena, New Orleans, Florida, U.S.	
163	Win	64–9–6 (84)	Joe Tiplitz	NWS	10	Mar 25, 1926	Fleetwood Arena, Miami Beach, Florida, U.S.	
162	Win	64–9–6 (83)	Freddie Jacks	TKO	6 (10)	Mar 5, 1926	Benjamin Field Arena, Tampa, Florida, U.S.	
161	Win	63–9–6 (83)	Jimmy Goodrich	UD	15	Dec 7, 1925	Broadway Auditorium, Buffalo, New York, U.S.	Won NYSAC, NBA, and The Ring lightweight titles
160	Win	62–9–6 (83)	Fred Kelly	TKO	1 (10)	Nov 2, 1925	Broadway Auditorium, Buffalo, New York, U.S.	
159	Win	61–9–6 (83)	Joe Jawson	KO	2 (10)	Sep 28, 1925	Broadway Auditorium, Buffalo, New York, U.S.	
158	Win	60–9–6 (83)	Joe Jawson	UD	6	May 11, 1925	Broadway Auditorium, Buffalo, New York, U.S.	
157	Loss	59–9–6 (83)	Sid Terris	DQ	5 (10)	Apr 27, 1925	Broadway Auditorium, Buffalo, New York, U.S.	
156	Win	59–8–6 (83)	Red Cap Wilson	PTS	6	Feb 16, 1925	Broadway Auditorium, Buffalo, New York, U.S.	
155	Win	58–8–6 (83)	Jack Bernstein	UD	10	Nov 26, 1924	Broadway Auditorium, Buffalo, New York, U.S.	
154	Win	57–8–6 (83)	Luis Vicentini	PTS	10	Oct 13, 1924	Broadway Auditorium, Buffalo, New York, U.S.	
153	Loss	56–8–6 (83)	Luis Vicentini	KO	11 (15)	Jul 14, 1924	Queensboro Stadium, Long Island City, Queens, New York, U.S.	
152	Win	56–7–6 (83)	Freddie Jacks	UD	6	May 20, 1924	Johnson Field, Johnson City, New York, U.S.	
151	Win	55–7–6 (83)	Johnny Dundee	UD	10	Apr 21, 1924	Broadway Auditorium, Buffalo, New York, U.S.	
150	Draw	54–7–6 (83)	Jack Bernstein	PTS	10	Feb 18, 1924	Broadway Auditorium, Buffalo, New York, U.S.	
149	Win	54–7–5 (83)	Teddy Meyers	PTS	10	Jan 1, 1924	Broadway Auditorium, Buffalo, New York, U.S.	
148	Win	53–7–5 (83)	Freddie Jacks	PTS	6	Dec 10, 1923	Broadway Auditorium, Buffalo, New York, U.S.	
147	Loss	52–7–5 (83)	Jack Bernstein	UD	15	Oct 12, 1923	Madison Square Garden, New York City, New York, U.S.	
146	Win	52–6–5 (83)	Johnny Mendelsohn	NWS	10	Jul 11, 1923	Arena Ice Gardens, Milwaukee, Wisconsin, U.S.	
145	Win	52–6–5 (82)	Alex Hart	NWS	8	Apr 30, 1923	Arena, Philadelphia, Pennsylvania, U.S.	
144	Win	52–6–5 (81)	Charley White	PTS	15	Feb 9, 1923	Madison Square Garden, New York City, New York, U.S.	
143	Win	51–6–5 (81)	Chubby Brown	PTS	12	Jan 26, 1923	Arena, Syracuse, New York, U.S.	
142	Win	50–6–5 (81)	Sammy Berne	PTS	10	Jan 1, 1923	Broadway Auditorium, Buffalo, New York, U.S.	
141	Win	49–6–5 (81)	Johnny Donnelly	NWS	10	Dec 15, 1922	Erie, Pennsylvania, U.S.	
140	Win	49–6–5 (80)	Pete Hartley	PTS	10	Nov 30, 1922	Broadway Auditorium, Buffalo, New York, U.S.	
139	Loss	48–6–5 (80)	Benny Leonard	TKO	8 (10)	Jul 4, 1922	Floyd Fitzsimmons' Arena, Michigan City, Indiana, U.S.	
138	Win	48–5–5 (80)	Johnny Harvey	TKO	4 (10)	May 12, 1922	Broadway Auditorium, Buffalo, New York, U.S.	
137	Win	47–5–5 (80)	Gene Delmont	UD	10	Mar 10, 1922	Broadway Auditorium, Buffalo, New York, U.S.	
136	Loss	46–5–5 (80)	Benny Leonard	UD	15	Feb 10, 1922	Madison Square Garden, New York City, New York, U.S.	For NYSAC and NBA lightweight titles
135	Win	46–4–5 (80)	Johnny Ray	NWS	10	Dec 26, 1921	Motor Square Garden, Pittsburgh, Pennsylvania, U.S.	
134	Draw	46–4–5 (79)	Sid Barbarian	PTS	10	Dec 17, 1921	Armouries, Windsor, Ontario, Canada	
133	Win	46–4–4 (79)	Barney Adair	PTS	10	Dec 9, 1921	Broadway Auditorium, Buffalo, New York, U.S.	
132	Win	45–4–4 (79)	Johnny Mendelsohn	NWS	10	Nov 22, 1921	Auditorium, Milwaukee, Wisconsin, U.S.	
131	Win	45–4–4 (78)	Packy Hommey	TKO	2 (12)	Nov 16, 1921	Arena, Syracuse, New York, U.S.	
130	Win	44–4–4 (78)	Lew Tendler	PTS	15	Oct 21, 1921	Madison Square Garden, New York City, New York, U.S.	
129	Win	43–4–4 (78)	Frankie Britt	PTS	10	Oct 3, 1921	Arena, Boston, Massachusetts, U.S.	
128	Win	42–4–4 (78)	Mixer Mitchell	KO	8 (15)	Sep 12, 1921	Star Park, Syracuse, New York, U.S.	
127	Win	41–4–4 (78)	Frankie Schoell	UD	12	Jun 27, 1921	Broadway Auditorium, Buffalo, New York, U.S.	
126	Loss	40–4–4 (78)	Benny Leonard	NWS	12	Jun 6, 1921	Federal League Baseball Park, Harrison, New Jersey, U.S.	NYSAC and NBA lightweight titles at stake; (via KO only)
125	Win	40–4–4 (77)	Gene Delmont	PTS	12	May 30, 1921	Walker AC, Astoria, New York, U.S.	
124	Win	39–4–4 (77)	Harlem Eddie Kelly	KO	2 (12)	May 6, 1921	Broadway Auditorium, Buffalo, New York, U.S.	
123	Loss	38–4–4 (77)	Johnny Dundee	NWS	10	Apr 26, 1921	Auditorium, Milwaukee, Wisconsin, U.S.	
122	Win	38–4–4 (76)	Bobby Ward	KO	5 (10)	Apr 4, 1921	Auditorium, Saint Paul, Minnesota, U.S.	
121	Win	37–4–4 (76)	Willie Jackson	PTS	12	Mar 21, 1921	Madison Square Garden, New York City, New York, U.S.	
120	Win	36–4–4 (76)	Richie Mitchell	NWS	10	Mar 9, 1921	Auditorium, Milwaukee, Wisconsin, U.S.	
119	Win	36–4–4 (75)	Richie Mitchell	KO	1 (12)	Feb 18, 1921	Broadway Auditorium, Buffalo, New York, U.S.	
118	Win	35–4–4 (75)	Lockport Jimmy Duffy	KO	1 (12)	Jan 21, 1921	Broadway Auditorium, Buffalo, New York, U.S.	
117	Win	34–4–4 (75)	Larry Hansen	TKO	10 (12)	Nov 20, 1920	Broadway Auditorium, Buffalo, New York, U.S.	
116	Win	33–4–4 (75)	George Chaney	PTS	12	Aug 23, 1920	Oriole Park, Baltimore, Maryland, U.S.	
115	Win	32–4–4 (75)	Pinky Mitchell	NWS	10	Jun 30, 1920	Navin Field, Detroit, Michigan, U.S.	
114	Win	32–4–4 (74)	Allentown Dundee	NWS	10	Jun 14, 1920	Buffalo Auditorium, Buffalo, New York, U.S.	
113	Win	32–4–4 (73)	Matt Brock	NWS	10	Jun 9, 1920	Navin Field, Detroit, Michigan, U.S.	
112	Win	32–4–4 (72)	Joe Welling	NWS	10	May 24, 1920	Broadway Auditorium, Buffalo, New York, U.S.	
111	Win	32–4–4 (71)	Frankie Bull	KO	6 (10)	Apr 28, 1920	Arena, Toronto, Ontario, Canada	
110	Win	31–4–4 (71)	Ralph Brady	PTS	12	Apr 23, 1920	Albaugh Theater, Baltimore, Maryland, U.S.	
109	Win	30–4–4 (71)	Babe Picato	NWS	10	Apr 16, 1920	Broadway Auditorium, Buffalo, New York, U.S.	
108	Loss	30–4–4 (70)	Babe Picato	NWS	10	Mar 19, 1920	Convention Hall, Rochester, New York, U.S.	
107	Win	30–4–4 (69)	Westside Jimmy Duffy	NWS	10	Mar 17, 1920	Broadway Auditorium, Buffalo, New York, U.S.	
106	Draw	30–4–4 (68)	Pete Hartley	PTS	12 (10)	Dec 26, 1919	Albaugh Theater, Baltimore, Maryland, U.S.	
105	Draw	30–4–3 (68)	Benny Valger	NWS	10	Dec 9, 1919	Arena, Syracuse, New York, U.S.	
104	Win	30–4–3 (67)	Frankie Britt	NWS	10	Dec 1, 1919	Broadway Auditorium, Buffalo, New York, U.S.	
103	Win	30–4–3 (66)	Ralph Brady	NWS	10	Nov 18, 1919	Arena, Syracuse, New York, U.S.	
102	Win	30–4–3 (65)	Joe Tiplitz	NWS	6	Nov 15, 1919	National A.C., Philadelphia, Pennsylvania, U.S.	
101	Win	30–4–3 (64)	Eddie Dorsey	TKO	9 (10)	Nov 6, 1919	Massey Hall, Toronto, Ontario, Canada	
100	Win	29–4–3 (64)	K.O. Mars	NWS	10	Nov 3, 1919	Broadway Auditorium, Buffalo, New York, U.S.	
99	Win	29–4–3 (63)	Artie O'Leary	NWS	6	Sep 22, 1919	Olympia A.C., Philadelphia, Pennsylvania, U.S.	
98	Loss	29–4–3 (62)	Lew Tendler	NWS	10	Jan 1, 1919	Broadway Auditorium, Buffalo, New York, U.S.	
97	Loss	29–4–3 (61)	Frankie Britt	PTS	12	Dec 17, 1918	Armory, Boston, Massachusetts, U.S.	
96	Draw	29–3–3 (61)	Benny Valger	NWS	6	Nov 9, 1918	National A.C., Philadelphia, Pennsylvania, U.S.	
95	Draw	29–3–3 (60)	Frankie Britt	PTS	12	Nov 5, 1918	Arena, Boston, Massachusetts, U.S.	
94	Draw	29–3–2 (60)	Johnny Dundee	PTS	12	Sep 10, 1918	Arena, Boston, Massachusetts, U.S.	
93	Win	29–3–1 (60)	Joe Thomas	NWS	4	Aug 23, 1918	Baseball Park, Buffalo, New York, U.S.	
92	Win	29–3–1 (59)	Phil Bloom	NWS	8	Jul 24, 1918	Wrightstown, New Jersey, U.S.	
91	Draw	29–3–1 (58)	Patsy Cline	NWS	12	Jul 8, 1918	Coliseum, Toledo, Ohio, U.S.	
90	Win	29–3–1 (57)	Jake Schiffer	NWS	10	Jun 24, 1918	Broadway Auditorium, Buffalo, New York, U.S.	
89	Win	29–3–1 (56)	Eddie 'Kid' Black	KO	2 (4)	Jun 6, 1918	Broadway Auditorium, Buffalo, New York, U.S.	
88	Win	28–3–1 (56)	Fighting Zunner	NWS	10	May 27, 1918	Broadway Auditorium, Buffalo, New York, U.S.	
87	Win	28–3–1 (55)	Lockport Jimmy Duffy	NWS	10	May 3, 1918	Broadway Auditorium, Buffalo, New York, U.S.	
86	Win	28–3–1 (54)	Artie O'Leary	TKO	5 (6)	Apr 27, 1918	National A.C., Philadelphia, Pennsylvania, U.S.	
85	Loss	27–3–1 (54)	Patsy Cline	NWS	10	Apr 10, 1918	Broadway Auditorium, Buffalo, New York, U.S.	
84	Win	27–3–1 (53)	Young Terry McGovern	NWS	6	Apr 2, 1918	Broadway Auditorium, Buffalo, New York, U.S.	
83	Win	27–3–1 (52)	Willie Jackson	NWS	10	Mar 11, 1918	Broadway Auditorium, Buffalo, New York, U.S.	
82	Draw	27–3–1 (51)	Willie Jackson	NWS	10	Feb 18, 1918	Broadway Auditorium, Buffalo, New York, U.S.	
81	Win	27–3–1 (50)	Clonie Tait	NWS	10	Jan 18, 1918	Broadway Auditorium, Buffalo, New York, U.S.	
80	Loss	27–3–1 (49)	Lew Tendler	NWS	6	Oct 29, 1917	Olympia A.C., Philadelphia, Pennsylvania, U.S.	
79	Draw	27–3–1 (48)	Frankie Callahan	NWS	10	Oct 18, 1917	Broadway Auditorium, Buffalo, New York, U.S.	
78	Loss	27–3–1 (47)	Willie Jackson	NWS	6	Oct 8, 1917	Olympia A.C., Philadelphia, Pennsylvania, U.S.	
77	Win	27–3–1 (46)	George Chaney	NWS	6	Sep 10, 1917	Olympia A.C., Philadelphia, Pennsylvania, U.S.	
76	Win	27–3–1 (45)	George Chaney	NWS	10	Jul 23, 1917	Broadway Auditorium, Buffalo, New York, U.S.	
75	Loss	27–3–1 (44)	Babe Picato	NWS	10	Jun 11, 1917	Opera House, New Castle, Pennsylvania, U.S.	
74	Loss	27–3–1 (43)	Johnny Dundee	PTS	12	May 29, 1917	Arena, Boston, Massachusetts, U.S.	
73	Win	27–2–1 (43)	Freddie Welsh	NWS	10	Apr 20, 1917	Broadway Auditorium, Buffalo, New York, U.S.	
72	Win	27–2–1 (42)	Red Dolan	NWS	10	Apr 12, 1917	Auditorium, Racine, Wisconsin, U.S.	
71	Win	27–2–1 (41)	Phil Virgets	NWS	10	Mar 28, 1917	Gray's Armory, Cleveland, Ohio, U.S.	
70	Win	27–2–1 (40)	Johnny Kilbane	NWS	10	Feb 26, 1917	Broadway Auditorium, Buffalo, New York, U.S.	
69	Win	27–2–1 (39)	Cal Delaney	NWS	10	Feb 8, 1917	Central Armory, Cleveland, Ohio, U.S.	
68	Win	27–2–1 (38)	Pete Hartley	NWS	10	Jan 29, 1917	Broadway Auditorium, Buffalo, New York, U.S.	
67	Win	27–2–1 (37)	Jake Schiffer	NWS	10	Jan 9, 1917	Broadway Auditorium, Buffalo, New York, U.S.	
66	Win	27–2–1 (36)	Henry Cherry	TKO	8 (10)	Nov 30, 1916	Broadway Auditorium, Buffalo, New York, U.S.	
65	Win	26–2–1 (36)	Gene Belmont	PTS	10	Nov 22, 1916	Windsor A.C., Windsor, Ontario, Canada	
64	Win	25–2–1 (36)	Johnny O'Leary	NWS	10	Nov 10, 1916	Broadway Auditorium, Buffalo, New York, U.S.	
63	Win	25–2–1 (35)	Harry Condon	NWS	10	Nov 6, 1916	Flower City A.C., Rochester, New York, U.S.	
62	Win	25–2–1 (34)	Shamus O'Brien	NWS	10	Sep 11, 1916	Urban Liberty Park, Buffalo, New York, U.S.	
61	Win	25–2–1 (33)	Gene Delmont	NWS	10	Sep 1, 1916	Urban Liberty Park, Buffalo, New York, U.S.	
60	Win	25–2–1 (32)	Pete Hartley	NWS	10	Jul 7, 1916	Rochester, New York, U.S.	
59	Win	25–2–1 (31)	Jack White	TKO	2 (?)	Jun 30, 1916	Welland, Ontario, Canada	
58	Loss	24–2–1 (31)	Jake Schiffer	NWS	10	May 29, 1916	Majestic Theater, Buffalo, New York, U.S.	
57	Win	24–2–1 (30)	Frankie Nelson	NWS	10	Apr 3, 1916	Broadway Auditorium, Buffalo, New York, U.S.	
56	Win	24–2–1 (29)	Tickle Sanders	NWS	10	Mar 16, 1916	Garden Theater, Buffalo, New York, U.S.	
55	Loss	24–2–1 (28)	Benny Leonard	NWS	10	Feb 28, 1916	Broadway Auditorium, Buffalo, New York, U.S.	
54	Win	24–2–1 (27)	Patsy Drouillard	PTS	10	Feb 23, 1916	Windsor A.C., Windsor, Ontario, Canada	
53	Win	23–2–1 (27)	Frankie Callahan	NWS	10	Feb 4, 1916	Garden Theater, Buffalo, New York, U.S.	
52	Loss	23–2–1 (26)	Frankie Russell	PTS	15	Nov 15, 1915	Orleans A.C., New Orleans, Louisiana, U.S.	
51	Win	23–1–1 (26)	Frankie Russell	PTS	15	Oct 25, 1915	Orleans A.C., New Orleans, Louisiana, U.S.	
50	Draw	22–1–1 (26)	Joe Mandot	NWS	10	Oct 6, 1915	Buffalo, New York, U.S.	
49	Draw	22–1–1 (25)	Joe Mandot	NWS	10	Sep 6, 1915	Broadway Auditorium, Buffalo, New York, U.S.	
48	Win	22–1–1 (24)	Ad Wolgast	NWS	10	Jul 23, 1915	Buffalo, New York, U.S.	
47	Win	22–1–1 (23)	Frankie Daley	NWS	10	Jun 8, 1915	Erie, Pennsylvania, U.S.	
46	Loss	22–1–1 (22)	Johnny Dundee	NWS	10	May 3, 1915	Broadway Auditorium, Buffalo, New York, U.S.	
45	Loss	22–1–1 (21)	Joe Goldberg	NWS	10	Apr 12, 1915	Garden Roller Rink, Rochester, New York, U.S.	
44	Win	22–1–1 (20)	Eddie Morgan	NWS	10	Mar 24, 1915	Broadway Auditorium, Buffalo, New York, U.S.	
43	Win	22–1–1 (19)	Eddie Morgan	NWS	10	Feb 22, 1915	Broadway Auditorium, Buffalo, New York, U.S.	
42	Loss	22–1–1 (18)	Johnny Kilbane	NWS	10	Feb 1, 1915	Broadway Auditorium, Buffalo, New York, U.S.	
41	Win	22–1–1 (17)	Harry Boyle	NWS	10	Jan 11, 1915	Miller's Hall, Buffalo, New York, U.S.	
40	Win	22–1–1 (16)	Kid Julian	NWS	10	Jun 8, 1914	Alhambra Rink, Syracuse, New York, U.S.	
39	Win	22–1–1 (15)	Bobby Reynolds	NWS	12	May 25, 1914	Liberty A.C., Bridgeport, Connecticut, U.S.	
38	Win	22–1–1 (14)	Harry Condon	NWS	10	May 11, 1914	St. Nicholas Arena, New York City, New York, U.S.	
37	Win	22–1–1 (13)	Tommy Bresnahan	KO	2 (10)	Feb 24, 1914	Broadway Auditorium, Buffalo, New York, U.S.	
36	Win	21–1–1 (13)	Johnny Dundee	NWS	10	Feb 24, 1914	Broadway Auditorium, Buffalo, New York, U.S.	
35	Win	21–1–1 (12)	Joe Goldberg	NWS	10	Feb 6, 1914	Elmwood Music Hall, Buffalo, New York, U.S.	
34	Win	21–1–1 (11)	Jimmy Cavanaugh	KO	3 (10)	Feb 3, 1914	Miller's Hall, Buffalo, New York, U.S.	
33	Win	20–1–1 (11)	Eddie Wallace	NWS	10	Dec 26, 1913	Broadway Auditorium, Buffalo, New York, U.S.	
32	Win	20–1–1 (10)	Eddie Sentry	TKO	5 (6)	Dec 22, 1913	Grand Opera House, Youngstown, Ohio, U.S.	
31	Win	19–1–1 (10)	Johnny Sokol	TKO	9 (10)	Nov 28, 1913	Elmwood Music Hall, Buffalo, New York, U.S.	
30	Win	18–1–1 (10)	Jack Dexter	TKO	5 (10)	Nov 14, 1913	Elmwood Music Hall, Buffalo, New York, U.S.	
29	Win	17–1–1 (10)	Young Joey	NWS	10	Oct 27, 1913	Alhambra, Syracuse, New York, U.S.	
28	Win	17–1–1 (9)	Harry Boyle	KO	2 (6)	Oct 17, 1913	Broadway Auditorium, Buffalo, New York, U.S.	
27	Win	16–1–1 (9)	Johnny Harris	NWS	6	Sep 29, 1913	Elmwood Music Hall, Buffalo, New York, U.S.	
26	Win	16–1–1 (8)	Jack Dexter	TKO	4 (10)	Jul 3, 1913	Broadway Auditorium, Buffalo, New York, U.S.	
25	Draw	15–1–1 (8)	Oscar Williams	PTS	10	Jun 20, 1913	Paducah, Kentucky, U.S.	
24	Loss	15–1 (8)	Jack Dexter	NWS	6	May 2, 1913	Broadway Auditorium, Buffalo, New York, U.S.	
23	Win	15–1 (7)	Danny McCabe	NWS	6	Apr 28, 1913	Olympia A.C., Philadelphia, Pennsylvania, U.S.	
22	Win	15–1 (6)	Oscar Williams	TKO	10 (10)	Mar 25, 1913	Broadway Auditorium, Buffalo, New York, U.S.	
21	Loss	14–1 (6)	Stanley Scully	NWS	6	Jan 1, 1913	Olympia A.C., Philadelphia, Pennsylvania, U.S.	
20	Win	14–1 (5)	Sammy Baker	NWS	6	Dec 5, 1912	Broadway Auditorium, Buffalo, New York, U.S.	
19	Draw	14–1 (4)	Joe Clark	NWS	6	Nov 21, 1912	Broadway Auditorium, Buffalo, New York, U.S.	
18	Win	14–1 (3)	Jack Dexter	NWS	6	Nov 11, 1912	Convention Hall, Buffalo, New York, U.S.	
17	Win	14–1 (2)	Joe Stein	TKO	8 (10)	Sep 24, 1912	International A.C., Buffalo, New York, U.S.	
16	Draw	13–1 (2)	Jack Dexter	NWS	6	Sep 13, 1912	International A.C., Buffalo, New York, U.S.	
15	Win	13–1 (1)	Dick Clancy	KO	3 (?)	Sep 2, 1912	Convention Hall, Buffalo, New York, U.S.	
14	Win	12–1 (1)	Jack Joynt	KO	1 (?)	Aug 30, 1912	International A.C., Buffalo, New York, U.S.	
13	Win	11–1 (1)	Jack White	KO	3 (?)	Mar 1, 1912	Buffalo, New York, U.S.	Precise date of bout unknown at this time
12	Win	10–1 (1)	Jack White	KO	3 (?)	Feb 17, 1912	Welland, Ontario, Canada	
11	Win	9–1 (1)	Jack Harris	KO	1 (?)	Feb 1, 1912	Buffalo, New York, U.S.	Precise date of bout unknown at this time
10	Win	8–1 (1)	Young Nelson	KO	2 (?)	Jan 1, 1912	Buffalo, New York, U.S.	Venue unknown
9	Loss	7–1 (1)	Jack Dexter	TKO	3 (?)	Nov 24, 1911	Convention Hall, Buffalo, New York, U.S.	
8	Win	7–0 (1)	George Ross	PTS	6	Oct 28, 1911	Welland, Ontario, Canada	
7	Win	6–0 (1)	Young Tuttle	KO	1 (?)	Jul 14, 1911	Convention Hall, Buffalo, New York, U.S.	
6	Win	5–0 (1)	Willie O'Neill	KO	1 (4)	Jun 23, 1911	International A.C., Buffalo, New York, U.S.	
5	Win	4–0 (1)	Battling Kline	KO	2 (?)	Jun 1, 1911	Buffalo, New York, U.S.	Precise date of bout unknown at this time
4	Win	3–0 (1)	Young Green	KO	2 (?)	Mar 1, 1911	Buffalo, New York, U.S.	Precise date of bout unknown at this time
3	ND	2–0 (1)	Kid George	ND	4	Feb 25, 1911	Buffalo, New York, U.S.	Precise date of bout unknown at this time
2	Win	2–0	Young Thomas	KO	2 (?)	Feb 1, 1911	Buffalo, New York, U.S.	Precise date of bout unknown at this time
1	Win	1–0	Young Thomas	KO	3 (?)	Jan 1, 1911	Buffalo, New York, U.S.	Precise date of bout unknown at this time

=== Unofficial record ===
166 fights	123 wins	27 losses
By knockout	38	3
By decision	85	23
By disqualification	0	1
Draws	15	
No contests	1	

Record with the inclusion of newspaper decisions in the win/loss/draw column.

No.	Result	Record	Opponent	Type	Round	Date	Location	Notes
166	Loss	123–27–15 (1)	Joe Trippe	UD	6	Sep 30, 1932	Broadway Auditorium, Buffalo, New York, U.S.	
165	Loss	123–26–15 (1)	Sammy Mandell	PTS	10	Jul 3, 1926	Comiskey Park, Chicago, Illinois, U.S.	Lost NYSAC, NBA, and The Ring lightweight titles
164	Loss	123–25–15 (1)	Pal Moran	NWS	10	Apr 12, 1926	Coliseum Arena, New Orleans, Florida, U.S.	
163	Win	123–24–15 (1)	Joe Tiplitz	NWS	10	Mar 25, 1926	Fleetwood Arena, Miami Beach, Florida, U.S.	
162	Win	122–24–15 (1)	Freddie Jacks	TKO	6 (10)	Mar 5, 1926	Benjamin Field Arena, Tampa, Florida, U.S.	
161	Win	121–24–15 (1)	Jimmy Goodrich	UD	15	Dec 7, 1925	Broadway Auditorium, Buffalo, New York, U.S.	Won NYSAC, NBA, and The Ring lightweight titles
160	Win	120–24–15 (1)	Fred Kelly	TKO	1 (10)	Nov 2, 1925	Broadway Auditorium, Buffalo, New York, U.S.	
159	Win	119–24–15 (1)	Joe Jawson	KO	2 (10)	Sep 28, 1925	Broadway Auditorium, Buffalo, New York, U.S.	
158	Win	118–24–15 (1)	Joe Jawson	UD	6	May 11, 1925	Broadway Auditorium, Buffalo, New York, U.S.	
157	Loss	117–24–15 (1)	Sid Terris	DQ	5 (10)	Apr 27, 1925	Broadway Auditorium, Buffalo, New York, U.S.	
156	Win	117–23–15 (1)	Red Cap Wilson	PTS	6	Feb 16, 1925	Broadway Auditorium, Buffalo, New York, U.S.	
155	Win	116–23–15 (1)	Jack Bernstein	UD	10	Nov 26, 1924	Broadway Auditorium, Buffalo, New York, U.S.	
154	Win	115–23–15 (1)	Luis Vicentini	PTS	10	Oct 13, 1924	Broadway Auditorium, Buffalo, New York, U.S.	
153	Loss	114–23–15 (1)	Luis Vicentini	KO	11 (15)	Jul 14, 1924	Queensboro Stadium, Long Island City, Queens, New York, U.S.	
152	Win	114–22–15 (1)	Freddie Jacks	UD	6	May 20, 1924	Johnson Field, Johnson City, New York, U.S.	
151	Win	113–22–15 (1)	Johnny Dundee	UD	10	Apr 21, 1924	Broadway Auditorium, Buffalo, New York, U.S.	
150	Draw	112–22–15 (1)	Jack Bernstein	PTS	10	Feb 18, 1924	Broadway Auditorium, Buffalo, New York, U.S.	
149	Win	112–22–14 (1)	Teddy Meyers	PTS	10	Jan 1, 1924	Broadway Auditorium, Buffalo, New York, U.S.	
148	Win	111–22–14 (1)	Freddie Jacks	PTS	6	Dec 10, 1923	Broadway Auditorium, Buffalo, New York, U.S.	
147	Loss	110–22–14 (1)	Jack Bernstein	UD	15	Oct 12, 1923	Madison Square Garden, New York City, New York, U.S.	
146	Win	110–21–14 (1)	Johnny Mendelsohn	NWS	10	Jul 11, 1923	Arena Ice Gardens, Milwaukee, Wisconsin, U.S.	
145	Win	109–21–14 (1)	Alex Hart	NWS	8	Apr 30, 1923	Arena, Philadelphia, Pennsylvania, U.S.	
144	Win	108–21–14 (1)	Charley White	PTS	15	Feb 9, 1923	Madison Square Garden, New York City, New York, U.S.	
143	Win	107–21–14 (1)	Chubby Brown	PTS	12	Jan 26, 1923	Arena, Syracuse, New York, U.S.	
142	Win	106–21–14 (1)	Sammy Berne	PTS	10	Jan 1, 1923	Broadway Auditorium, Buffalo, New York, U.S.	
141	Win	105–21–14 (1)	Johnny Donnelly	NWS	10	Dec 15, 1922	Erie, Pennsylvania, U.S.	
140	Win	104–21–14 (1)	Pete Hartley	PTS	10	Nov 30, 1922	Broadway Auditorium, Buffalo, New York, U.S.	
139	Loss	103–21–14 (1)	Benny Leonard	TKO	8 (10)	Jul 4, 1922	Floyd Fitzsimmons' Arena, Michigan City, Indiana, U.S.	
138	Win	103–20–14 (1)	Johnny Harvey	TKO	4 (10)	May 12, 1922	Broadway Auditorium, Buffalo, New York, U.S.	
137	Win	102–20–14 (1)	Gene Delmont	UD	10	Mar 10, 1922	Broadway Auditorium, Buffalo, New York, U.S.	
136	Loss	101–20–14 (1)	Benny Leonard	UD	15	Feb 10, 1922	Madison Square Garden, New York City, New York, U.S.	For NYSAC and NBA lightweight titles
135	Win	101–19–14 (1)	Johnny Ray	NWS	10	Dec 26, 1921	Motor Square Garden, Pittsburgh, Pennsylvania, U.S.	
134	Draw	100–19–14 (1)	Sid Barbarian	PTS	10	Dec 17, 1921	Armouries, Windsor, Ontario, Canada	
133	Win	100–19–13 (1)	Barney Adair	PTS	10	Dec 9, 1921	Broadway Auditorium, Buffalo, New York, U.S.	
132	Win	99–19–13 (1)	Johnny Mendelsohn	NWS	10	Nov 22, 1921	Auditorium, Milwaukee, Wisconsin, U.S.	
131	Win	98–19–13 (1)	Packy Hommey	TKO	2 (12)	Nov 16, 1921	Arena, Syracuse, New York, U.S.	
130	Win	97–19–13 (1)	Lew Tendler	PTS	15	Oct 21, 1921	Madison Square Garden, New York City, New York, U.S.	
129	Win	96–19–13 (1)	Frankie Britt	PTS	10	Oct 3, 1921	Arena, Boston, Massachusetts, U.S.	
128	Win	95–19–13 (1)	Mixer Mitchell	KO	8 (15)	Sep 12, 1921	Star Park, Syracuse, New York, U.S.	
127	Win	94–19–13 (1)	Frankie Schoell	UD	12	Jun 27, 1921	Broadway Auditorium, Buffalo, New York, U.S.	
126	Loss	93–19–13 (1)	Benny Leonard	NWS	12	Jun 6, 1921	Federal League Baseball Park, Harrison, New Jersey, U.S.	NYSAC and NBA lightweight titles at stake; (via KO only)
125	Win	93–18–13 (1)	Gene Delmont	PTS	12	May 30, 1921	Walker AC, Astoria, New York, U.S.	
124	Win	92–18–13 (1)	Harlem Eddie Kelly	KO	2 (12)	May 6, 1921	Broadway Auditorium, Buffalo, New York, U.S.	
123	Loss	91–18–13 (1)	Johnny Dundee	NWS	10	Apr 26, 1921	Auditorium, Milwaukee, Wisconsin, U.S.	
122	Win	91–17–13 (1)	Bobby Ward	KO	5 (10)	Apr 4, 1921	Auditorium, Saint Paul, Minnesota, U.S.	
121	Win	90–17–13 (1)	Willie Jackson	PTS	12	Mar 21, 1921	Madison Square Garden, New York City, New York, U.S.	
120	Win	89–17–13 (1)	Richie Mitchell	NWS	10	Mar 9, 1921	Auditorium, Milwaukee, Wisconsin, U.S.	
119	Win	88–17–13 (1)	Richie Mitchell	KO	1 (12)	Feb 18, 1921	Broadway Auditorium, Buffalo, New York, U.S.	
118	Win	87–17–13 (1)	Lockport Jimmy Duffy	KO	1 (12)	Jan 21, 1921	Broadway Auditorium, Buffalo, New York, U.S.	
117	Win	86–17–13 (1)	Larry Hansen	TKO	10 (12)	Nov 20, 1920	Broadway Auditorium, Buffalo, New York, U.S.	
116	Win	85–17–13 (1)	George Chaney	PTS	12	Aug 23, 1920	Oriole Park, Baltimore, Maryland, U.S.	
115	Win	84–17–13 (1)	Pinky Mitchell	NWS	10	Jun 30, 1920	Navin Field, Detroit, Michigan, U.S.	
114	Win	83–17–13 (1)	Allentown Dundee	NWS	10	Jun 14, 1920	Buffalo Auditorium, Buffalo, New York, U.S.	
113	Win	82–17–13 (1)	Matt Brock	NWS	10	Jun 9, 1920	Navin Field, Detroit, Michigan, U.S.	
112	Win	81–17–13 (1)	Joe Welling	NWS	10	May 24, 1920	Broadway Auditorium, Buffalo, New York, U.S.	
111	Win	80–17–13 (1)	Frankie Bull	KO	6 (10)	Apr 28, 1920	Arena, Toronto, Ontario, Canada	
110	Win	79–17–13 (1)	Ralph Brady	PTS	12	Apr 23, 1920	Albaugh Theater, Baltimore, Maryland, U.S.	
109	Win	78–17–13 (1)	Babe Picato	NWS	10	Apr 16, 1920	Broadway Auditorium, Buffalo, New York, U.S.	
108	Loss	77–17–13 (1)	Babe Picato	NWS	10	Mar 19, 1920	Convention Hall, Rochester, New York, U.S.	
107	Win	77–16–13 (1)	Westside Jimmy Duffy	NWS	10	Mar 17, 1920	Broadway Auditorium, Buffalo, New York, U.S.	
106	Draw	76–16–13 (1)	Pete Hartley	PTS	12 (10)	Dec 26, 1919	Albaugh Theater, Baltimore, Maryland, U.S.	
105	Draw	76–16–12 (1)	Benny Valger	NWS	10	Dec 9, 1919	Arena, Syracuse, New York, U.S.	
104	Win	76–16–11 (1)	Frankie Britt	NWS	10	Dec 1, 1919	Broadway Auditorium, Buffalo, New York, U.S.	
103	Win	75–16–11 (1)	Ralph Brady	NWS	10	Nov 18, 1919	Arena, Syracuse, New York, U.S.	
102	Win	74–16–11 (1)	Joe Tiplitz	NWS	6	Nov 15, 1919	National A.C., Philadelphia, Pennsylvania, U.S.	
101	Win	73–16–11 (1)	Eddie Dorsey	TKO	9 (10)	Nov 6, 1919	Massey Hall, Toronto, Ontario, Canada	
100	Win	72–16–11 (1)	K.O. Mars	NWS	10	Nov 3, 1919	Broadway Auditorium, Buffalo, New York, U.S.	
99	Win	71–16–11 (1)	Artie O'Leary	NWS	6	Sep 22, 1919	Olympia A.C., Philadelphia, Pennsylvania, U.S.	
98	Loss	70–16–11 (1)	Lew Tendler	NWS	10	Jan 1, 1919	Broadway Auditorium, Buffalo, New York, U.S.	
97	Loss	70–15–11 (1)	Frankie Britt	PTS	12	Dec 17, 1918	Armory, Boston, Massachusetts, U.S.	
96	Draw	70–14–11 (1)	Benny Valger	NWS	6	Nov 9, 1918	National A.C., Philadelphia, Pennsylvania, U.S.	
95	Draw	70–14–10 (1)	Frankie Britt	PTS	12	Nov 5, 1918	Arena, Boston, Massachusetts, U.S.	
94	Draw	70–14–9 (1)	Johnny Dundee	PTS	12	Sep 10, 1918	Arena, Boston, Massachusetts, U.S.	
93	Win	70–14–8 (1)	Joe Thomas	NWS	4	Aug 23, 1918	Baseball Park, Buffalo, New York, U.S.	
92	Win	69–14–8 (1)	Phil Bloom	NWS	8	Jul 24, 1918	Wrightstown, New Jersey, U.S.	
91	Draw	68–14–8 (1)	Patsy Cline	NWS	12	Jul 8, 1918	Coliseum, Toledo, Ohio, U.S.	
90	Win	68–14–7 (1)	Jake Schiffer	NWS	10	Jun 24, 1918	Broadway Auditorium, Buffalo, New York, U.S.	
89	Win	67–14–7 (1)	Eddie 'Kid' Black	KO	2 (4)	Jun 6, 1918	Broadway Auditorium, Buffalo, New York, U.S.	
88	Win	66–14–7 (1)	Fighting Zunner	NWS	10	May 27, 1918	Broadway Auditorium, Buffalo, New York, U.S.	
87	Win	65–14–7 (1)	Lockport Jimmy Duffy	NWS	10	May 3, 1918	Broadway Auditorium, Buffalo, New York, U.S.	
86	Win	64–14–7 (1)	Artie O'Leary	TKO	5 (6)	Apr 27, 1918	National A.C., Philadelphia, Pennsylvania, U.S.	
85	Loss	63–14–7 (1)	Patsy Cline	NWS	10	Apr 10, 1918	Broadway Auditorium, Buffalo, New York, U.S.	
84	Win	63–13–7 (1)	Young Terry McGovern	NWS	6	Apr 2, 1918	Broadway Auditorium, Buffalo, New York, U.S.	
83	Win	62–13–7 (1)	Willie Jackson	NWS	10	Mar 11, 1918	Broadway Auditorium, Buffalo, New York, U.S.	
82	Draw	61–13–7 (1)	Willie Jackson	NWS	10	Feb 18, 1918	Broadway Auditorium, Buffalo, New York, U.S.	
81	Win	61–13–6 (1)	Clonie Tait	NWS	10	Jan 18, 1918	Broadway Auditorium, Buffalo, New York, U.S.	
80	Loss	60–13–6 (1)	Lew Tendler	NWS	6	Oct 29, 1917	Olympia A.C., Philadelphia, Pennsylvania, U.S.	
79	Draw	60–12–6 (1)	Frankie Callahan	NWS	10	Oct 18, 1917	Broadway Auditorium, Buffalo, New York, U.S.	
78	Loss	60–12–5 (1)	Willie Jackson	NWS	6	Oct 8, 1917	Olympia A.C., Philadelphia, Pennsylvania, U.S.	
77	Win	60–11–5 (1)	George Chaney	NWS	6	Sep 10, 1917	Olympia A.C., Philadelphia, Pennsylvania, U.S.	
76	Win	59–11–5 (1)	George Chaney	NWS	10	Jul 23, 1917	Broadway Auditorium, Buffalo, New York, U.S.	
75	Loss	58–11–5 (1)	Babe Picato	NWS	10	Jun 11, 1917	Opera House, New Castle, Pennsylvania, U.S.	
74	Loss	58–10–5 (1)	Johnny Dundee	PTS	12	May 29, 1917	Arena, Boston, Massachusetts, U.S.	
73	Win	58–9–5 (1)	Freddie Welsh	NWS	10	Apr 20, 1917	Broadway Auditorium, Buffalo, New York, U.S.	
72	Win	57–9–5 (1)	Red Dolan	NWS	10	Apr 12, 1917	Auditorium, Racine, Wisconsin, U.S.	
71	Win	56–9–5 (1)	Phil Virgets	NWS	10	Mar 28, 1917	Gray's Armory, Cleveland, Ohio, U.S.	
70	Win	55–9–5 (1)	Johnny Kilbane	NWS	10	Feb 26, 1917	Broadway Auditorium, Buffalo, New York, U.S.	
69	Win	54–9–5 (1)	Cal Delaney	NWS	10	Feb 8, 1917	Central Armory, Cleveland, Ohio, U.S.	
68	Win	53–9–5 (1)	Pete Hartley	NWS	10	Jan 29, 1917	Broadway Auditorium, Buffalo, New York, U.S.	
67	Win	52–9–5 (1)	Jake Schiffer	NWS	10	Jan 9, 1917	Broadway Auditorium, Buffalo, New York, U.S.	
66	Win	51–9–5 (1)	Henry Cherry	TKO	8 (10)	Nov 30, 1916	Broadway Auditorium, Buffalo, New York, U.S.	
65	Win	50–9–5 (1)	Gene Belmont	PTS	10	Nov 22, 1916	Windsor A.C., Windsor, Ontario, Canada	
64	Win	49–9–5 (1)	Johnny O'Leary	NWS	10	Nov 10, 1916	Broadway Auditorium, Buffalo, New York, U.S.	
63	Win	48–9–5 (1)	Harry Condon	NWS	10	Nov 6, 1916	Flower City A.C., Rochester, New York, U.S.	
62	Win	47–9–5 (1)	Shamus O'Brien	NWS	10	Sep 11, 1916	Urban Liberty Park, Buffalo, New York, U.S.	
61	Win	46–9–5 (1)	Gene Delmont	NWS	10	Sep 1, 1916	Urban Liberty Park, Buffalo, New York, U.S.	
60	Win	45–9–5 (1)	Pete Hartley	NWS	10	Jul 7, 1916	Rochester, New York, U.S.	
59	Win	44–9–5 (1)	Jack White	TKO	2 (?)	Jun 30, 1916	Welland, Ontario, Canada	
58	Loss	43–9–5 (1)	Jake Schiffer	NWS	10	May 29, 1916	Majestic Theater, Buffalo, New York, U.S.	
57	Win	43–8–5 (1)	Frankie Nelson	NWS	10	Apr 3, 1916	Broadway Auditorium, Buffalo, New York, U.S.	
56	Win	42–8–5 (1)	Tickle Sanders	NWS	10	Mar 16, 1916	Garden Theater, Buffalo, New York, U.S.	
55	Loss	41–8–5 (1)	Benny Leonard	NWS	10	Feb 28, 1916	Broadway Auditorium, Buffalo, New York, U.S.	
54	Win	41–7–5 (1)	Patsy Drouillard	PTS	10	Feb 23, 1916	Windsor A.C., Windsor, Ontario, Canada	
53	Win	40–7–5 (1)	Frankie Callahan	NWS	10	Feb 4, 1916	Garden Theater, Buffalo, New York, U.S.	
52	Loss	39–7–5 (1)	Frankie Russell	PTS	15	Nov 15, 1915	Orleans A.C., New Orleans, Louisiana, U.S.	
51	Win	39–6–5 (1)	Frankie Russell	PTS	15	Oct 25, 1915	Orleans A.C., New Orleans, Louisiana, U.S.	
50	Draw	38–6–5 (1)	Joe Mandot	NWS	10	Oct 6, 1915	Buffalo, New York, U.S.	
49	Draw	38–6–4 (1)	Joe Mandot	NWS	10	Sep 6, 1915	Broadway Auditorium, Buffalo, New York, U.S.	
48	Win	38–6–3 (1)	Ad Wolgast	NWS	10	Jul 23, 1915	Buffalo, New York, U.S.	
47	Win	37–6–3 (1)	Frankie Daley	NWS	10	Jun 8, 1915	Erie, Pennsylvania, U.S.	
46	Loss	36–6–3 (1)	Johnny Dundee	NWS	10	May 3, 1915	Broadway Auditorium, Buffalo, New York, U.S.	
45	Loss	36–5–3 (1)	Joe Goldberg	NWS	10	Apr 12, 1915	Garden Roller Rink, Rochester, New York, U.S.	
44	Win	36–4–3 (1)	Eddie Morgan	NWS	10	Mar 24, 1915	Broadway Auditorium, Buffalo, New York, U.S.	
43	Win	35–4–3 (1)	Eddie Morgan	NWS	10	Feb 22, 1915	Broadway Auditorium, Buffalo, New York, U.S.	
42	Loss	34–4–3 (1)	Johnny Kilbane	NWS	10	Feb 1, 1915	Broadway Auditorium, Buffalo, New York, U.S.	
41	Win	34–3–3 (1)	Harry Boyle	NWS	10	Jan 11, 1915	Miller's Hall, Buffalo, New York, U.S.	
40	Win	33–3–3 (1)	Kid Julian	NWS	10	Jun 8, 1914	Alhambra Rink, Syracuse, New York, U.S.	
39	Win	32–3–3 (1)	Bobby Reynolds	NWS	12	May 25, 1914	Liberty A.C., Bridgeport, Connecticut, U.S.	
38	Win	31–3–3 (1)	Harry Condon	NWS	10	May 11, 1914	St. Nicholas Arena, New York City, New York, U.S.	
37	Win	30–3–3 (1)	Tommy Bresnahan	KO	2 (10)	Feb 24, 1914	Broadway Auditorium, Buffalo, New York, U.S.	
36	Win	29–3–3 (1)	Johnny Dundee	NWS	10	Feb 24, 1914	Broadway Auditorium, Buffalo, New York, U.S.	
35	Win	28–3–3 (1)	Joe Goldberg	NWS	10	Feb 6, 1914	Elmwood Music Hall, Buffalo, New York, U.S.	
34	Win	27–3–3 (1)	Jimmy Cavanaugh	KO	3 (10)	Feb 3, 1914	Miller's Hall, Buffalo, New York, U.S.	
33	Win	26–3–3 (1)	Eddie Wallace	NWS	10	Dec 26, 1913	Broadway Auditorium, Buffalo, New York, U.S.	
32	Win	25–3–3 (1)	Eddie Sentry	TKO	5 (6)	Dec 22, 1913	Grand Opera House, Youngstown, Ohio, U.S.	
31	Win	24–3–3 (1)	Johnny Sokol	TKO	9 (10)	Nov 28, 1913	Elmwood Music Hall, Buffalo, New York, U.S.	
30	Win	23–3–3 (1)	Jack Dexter	TKO	5 (10)	Nov 14, 1913	Elmwood Music Hall, Buffalo, New York, U.S.	
29	Win	22–3–3 (1)	Young Joey	NWS	10	Oct 27, 1913	Alhambra, Syracuse, New York, U.S.	
28	Win	21–3–3 (1)	Harry Boyle	KO	2 (6)	Oct 17, 1913	Broadway Auditorium, Buffalo, New York, U.S.	
27	Win	20–3–3 (1)	Johnny Harris	NWS	6	Sep 29, 1913	Elmwood Music Hall, Buffalo, New York, U.S.	
26	Win	19–3–3 (1)	Jack Dexter	TKO	4 (10)	Jul 3, 1913	Broadway Auditorium, Buffalo, New York, U.S.	
25	Draw	18–3–3 (1)	Oscar Williams	PTS	10	Jun 20, 1913	Paducah, Kentucky, U.S.	
24	Loss	18–3–2 (1)	Jack Dexter	NWS	6	May 2, 1913	Broadway Auditorium, Buffalo, New York, U.S.	
23	Win	18–2–2 (1)	Danny McCabe	NWS	6	Apr 28, 1913	Olympia A.C., Philadelphia, Pennsylvania, U.S.	
22	Win	17–2–2 (1)	Oscar Williams	TKO	10 (10)	Mar 25, 1913	Broadway Auditorium, Buffalo, New York, U.S.	
21	Loss	16–2–2 (1)	Stanley Scully	NWS	6	Jan 1, 1913	Olympia A.C., Philadelphia, Pennsylvania, U.S.	
20	Win	16–1–2 (1)	Sammy Baker	NWS	6	Dec 5, 1912	Broadway Auditorium, Buffalo, New York, U.S.	
19	Draw	15–1–2 (1)	Joe Clark	NWS	6	Nov 21, 1912	Broadway Auditorium, Buffalo, New York, U.S.	
18	Win	15–1–1 (1)	Jack Dexter	NWS	6	Nov 11, 1912	Convention Hall, Buffalo, New York, U.S.	
17	Win	14–1–1 (1)	Joe Stein	TKO	8 (10)	Sep 24, 1912	International A.C., Buffalo, New York, U.S.	
16	Draw	13–1–1 (1)	Jack Dexter	NWS	6	Sep 13, 1912	International A.C., Buffalo, New York, U.S.	
15	Win	13–1 (1)	Dick Clancy	KO	3 (?)	Sep 2, 1912	Convention Hall, Buffalo, New York, U.S.	
14	Win	12–1 (1)	Jack Joynt	KO	1 (?)	Aug 30, 1912	International A.C., Buffalo, New York, U.S.	
13	Win	11–1 (1)	Jack White	KO	3 (?)	Mar 1, 1912	Buffalo, New York, U.S.	Precise date of bout unknown at this time
12	Win	10–1 (1)	Jack White	KO	3 (?)	Feb 17, 1912	Welland, Ontario, Canada	
11	Win	9–1 (1)	Jack Harris	KO	1 (?)	Feb 1, 1912	Buffalo, New York, U.S.	Precise date of bout unknown at this time
10	Win	8–1 (1)	Young Nelson	KO	2 (?)	Jan 1, 1912	Buffalo, New York, U.S.	Venue unknown
9	Loss	7–1 (1)	Jack Dexter	TKO	3 (?)	Nov 24, 1911	Convention Hall, Buffalo, New York, U.S.	
8	Win	7–0 (1)	George Ross	PTS	6	Oct 28, 1911	Welland, Ontario, Canada	
7	Win	6–0 (1)	Young Tuttle	KO	1 (?)	Jul 14, 1911	Convention Hall, Buffalo, New York, U.S.	
6	Win	5–0 (1)	Willie O'Neill	KO	1 (4)	Jun 23, 1911	International A.C., Buffalo, New York, U.S.	
5	Win	4–0 (1)	Battling Kline	KO	2 (?)	Jun 1, 1911	Buffalo, New York, U.S.	Precise date of bout unknown at this time
4	Win	3–0 (1)	Young Green	KO	2 (?)	Mar 1, 1911	Buffalo, New York, U.S.	Precise date of bout unknown at this time
3	ND	2–0 (1)	Kid George	ND	4	Feb 25, 1911	Buffalo, New York, U.S.	Precise date of bout unknown at this time
2	Win	2–0	Young Thomas	KO	2 (?)	Feb 1, 1911	Buffalo, New York, U.S.	Precise date of bout unknown at this time
1	Win	1–0	Young Thomas	KO	3 (?)	Jan 1, 1911	Buffalo, New York, U.S.	Precise date of bout unknown at this time

== Titles in boxing ==
=== Major world titles ===
- NYSAC lightweight champion (135 lbs)
- NBA (WBA) lightweight champion (135 lbs)

=== The Ring magazine titles ===
- The Ring lightweight champion (135 lbs)

=== Undisputed titles ===
- Undisputed lightweight champion

== See also ==
- Lineal championship

Achievements
Preceded by Jimmy Goodrich	World Lightweight Champion; December 7, 1925 – June 3, 1926	Succeeded by Sammy Mandell
