= Luis Vicentini =

Chilean boxer

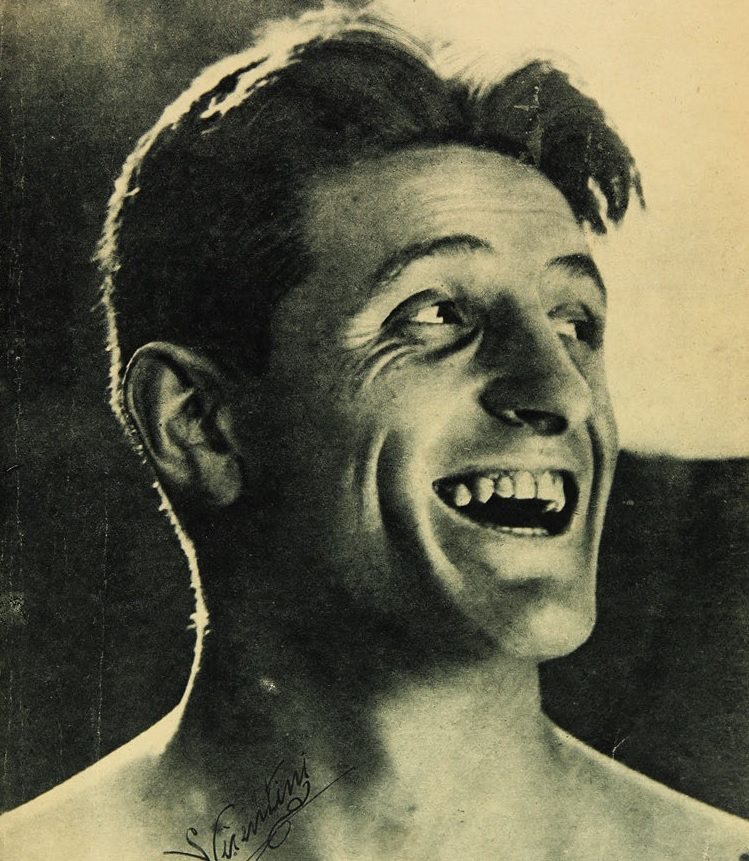
Vicentini in 1923.

Luis Vicentini (March 24, 1902 - February 9, 1938) was a Chilean boxer. In 1922 he starred in Carlos F. Borcosque's debut picture Hombres de esta tierra.
