= Ray Miller (boxer) =

American boxer (1905–1987)

Personal information
- Born: Ray Miller; October 5, 1905 Chicago, Illinois, U.S.
- Died: March 31, 1987 (aged 81) Deerfield Beach, Florida, U.S.
- Height: 5 ft 5 in (165 cm)
- Weight: Featherweight; Super featherweight Lightweight; Light welterweight

Boxing career
- Stance: Orthodox

Boxing record
- Total fights: 131
- Wins: 83
- Win by KO: 34
- Losses: 36
- Draws: 12

Ray Miller (October 5, 1905 – March 31, 1987) was an American professional boxer who competed from 1922 to 1936. He is the only boxer in history to have knocked out world welterweight champion Jimmy McLarnin, while Miller himself was never knocked out in 131 professional bouts. In 2016, The Sweet Science ranked Miller as the 49th greatest lightweight boxer of all time.

== Boxing career ==
Miller began his professional career with consecutive draws against Dick Keller in July and August 1922, before winning his next three bouts by knockout. He remained undefeated through his first 27 professional bouts before suffering his first loss to Artie Shiere on September 7, 1923. When The Ring magazine introduced its inaugural annual ratings for 1924, published in February 1925, Miller was ranked as the ninth-best featherweight in the world. He rose to No. 7 in the magazine's 1925 ratings, published in February 1926.

Miller faced Canadian featherweight champion Leo "Kid" Roy on June 16, 1926, losing by decision. In his next bout, on July 2, Miller faced Billy Petrolle for the first time, with the two fighting to a ten-round draw. Miller then faced Joe Glick, losing a razor-thin decision in a bout that many observers believed should have been scored a draw. Glick held the advantage in the early rounds, while Miller did his best work in the latter stages of the fight. Miller immediately rematched Glick in his next bout, avenging the loss.

By March 1928, Miller was the third-ranked super featherweight boxer in the world. On July 6, Miller faced Sid Terris, who entered the bout as a heavy favorite, with odds ranging from 5-to-1 to as high as 6-to-1. Just two minutes and 33 seconds into the opening round, Miller landed a left hook to the jaw that knocked Terris out, scoring a stunning upset.

Miller faced future world welterweight champion Jimmy McLarnin on November 30, 1928, after replacing Tommy Grogan, who had originally been scheduled to face McLarnin. Entering the bout as a 5-to-1 underdog, Miller opened a cut beneath McLarnin's right eye before the end of the first round and continued to control the action through the second and third. McLarnin rallied in the fourth and fifth rounds, but Miller regained the advantage in the sixth, landing a right and left to the jaw that caused McLarnin's knees to bend. McLarnin was so groggy by the end of the round that he mistakenly walked to Miller's corner instead of his own. In the seventh, another right-left combination to the jaw sent McLarnin reeling, and he staggered back to his corner on the verge of collapse as the round ended. Unable to answer the bell for the eighth, McLarnin's corner threw in the towel, giving Miller the victory by technical knockout. That same month, Miller established himself as the world's No. 1-ranked lightweight contender, behind only reigning world lightweight champion Sammy Mandell.

In late December 1928, it was reported that either Miller or Tommy Grogan was expected to next challenge Mandell for the world lightweight championship. The two contenders instead agreed to fight each other, meeting in back-to-back bouts at Olympia Stadium. With Mandell watching from ringside, Miller and Grogan met for the first time on January 11, 1929. Grogan floored Miller six times over the opening three rounds, but Miller mounted a dramatic comeback in the fourth, knocking Grogan out with a left hook after Grogan momentarily dropped his right hand. The United Press described the bout as one of the most spectacular ever staged at Olympia Stadium. In a rematch three weeks later, both fighters adopted a more cautious approach and were unable to reproduce the excitement of their first encounter, with Miller winning a ten-round decision.

Miller then faced Jimmy McLarnin in a rematch at Madison Square Garden on March 22, 1929. The bout drew a gross gate of more than $100,000, setting a new indoor record for any boxing match in which the maximum admission price was $10. Contested at 140 pounds, Miller entered as an 8-to-5 underdog, with McLarnin holding an eight-pound weight advantage. McLarnin avenged his earlier defeat by winning a unanimous decision over ten rounds. Following Miller's loss, former world heavyweight champion Jack Dempsey, who was promoting Mandell, stated that he had never committed to arranging a Mandell–Miller title fight unless Miller first defeated McLarnin, effectively ending Miller's immediate prospects of challenging for the championship.

In his next fight, on May 1, 1929, Miller faced Billy Petrolle for the second time, earning an unpopular ten-round decision that was met with boos from the crowd as he left the ring. The pair met for a third time in Miller's very next bout on June 6 at the Olympia Stadium in Detroit, Michigan, where Petrolle avenged the loss with a ten-round decision victory.

On February 20, 1931, Miller faced future world light welterweight champion Johnny Jadick, knocking him out with the first blow of the fight, a left hook to the chin. The bout lasted just 19 seconds, including the ten-count, making it the fastest knockout ever recorded in a Detroit ring at the time.

On February 26, 1932, Miller faced future world light welterweight title claimant Sammy Fuller at Madison Square Garden. Miller dropped Fuller to one knee with his signature left hook in the opening round, but Fuller turned the fight in his favor in the fourth, flooring Miller and relentlessly pressing the attack thereafter to outpoint Miller over ten rounds.

On August 26, 1932, Miller faced future three-division world champion Barney Ross at Sparta Stadium in Chicago, Illinois. Ross dropped Miller in the opening round and staggered him again in the sixth with a left to the body followed by a right to the chin, ultimately earning a one-sided unanimous decision.

Following his loss to Ross, Miller fought just three more times, going 2–1 before retiring in 1936 with a professional record of 83–36–12, including 34 knockout victories. Between February 1925 and May 1932, he spent a total of 41 months in The Ring's divisional rankings. Miller was managed by Hal Hixon from 1928 to 1929 and Joe Gould from 1930 to 1933.

== Later life and death ==
Following his retirement from professional boxing, Miller became a referee for the New York State Athletic Commission, officiating more than 135 bouts in New York City between 1946 and 1960, including numerous championship contests. During his refereeing career, he officiated bouts involving former world champions such as Floyd Patterson, Gene Fullmer, Sugar Ray Robinson, Ike Williams, Willie Pep, Rocky Marciano, Archie Moore, Carmen Basilio, Jake LaMotta, Kid Gavilán, and Sandy Saddler. Miller is also known for being the only referee to enter the ring during a world championship bout already in progress. On June 25, 1952, during the world light heavyweight championship bout between Robinson and Joey Maxim at Yankee Stadium, Miller took over as referee after the original referee collapsed from the heat following the tenth round.

Miller died in Deerfield Beach, Florida, on March 31, 1987, following a months-long battle with lung cancer. He was survived by his wife, Mary, and his sister, Sydelle Goldstein.

== Personal life ==
Miller was Jewish.

== Professional boxing record ==
| 131 fights | 83 wins | 36 losses |
|---|---|---|
| By knockout | 34 | 0 |
| By decision | 49 | 36 |
| Draws | 12 | |

| No. | Result | Record | Opponent | Type | Round, time | Date | Location | Notes |
|---|---|---|---|---|---|---|---|---|
| 131 | Loss | 83–36–12 | Jimmy Fantini | PTS | 8 | Jan 20, 1936 | St. Nicholas Arena, New York City, New York, U.S. | |
| 130 | Win | 83–35–12 | Jack Stanley | PTS | 6 | Sep 10, 1935 | Coney Island Velodrome, Brooklyn, New York, U.S. | |
| 129 | Win | 82–35–12 | Johnny Datto | PTS | 10 | Jan 1, 1933 | Auditorium, Milwaukee, Wisconsin, U.S. | |
| 128 | Loss | 81–35–12 | Barney Ross | UD | 10 | Aug 26, 1932 | Sparta Stadium, Chicago, Illinois, U.S. | |
| 127 | Loss | 81–34–12 | Lew Massey | PTS | 10 | Jun 29, 1932 | Greenlee Field, Pittsburgh, Pennsylvania, U.S. | |
| 126 | Loss | 81–33–12 | Cowboy Eddie Anderson | NWS | 10 | Jun 23, 1932 | Alt Parking Station, Des Moines, Iowa, U.S. | |
| 125 | Win | 81–32–12 | Johnny Datto | PTS | 10 | Jun 8, 1932 | Greenlee Field, Pittsburgh, Pennsylvania, U.S. | |
| 124 | Loss | 80–32–12 | Wesley Ramey | PTS | 10 | May 13, 1932 | Olympia Stadium, Detroit, Michigan, U.S. | |
| 123 | Loss | 80–31–12 | Sammy Fuller | PTS | 10 | Feb 26, 1932 | Madison Square Garden, New York City, New York, U.S. | |
| 122 | Win | 80–30–12 | Maxie Strub | PTS | 10 | Jan 8, 1932 | Arena Gardens, Detroit, Michigan, U.S. | |
| 121 | Win | 79–30–12 | Herman Perlick | UD | 10 | Dec 14, 1931 | St. Nicholas Arena, New York City, New York, U.S. | |
| 120 | Win | 78–30–12 | Solly Ritz | KO | 1 (6) | Oct 19, 1931 | Jamaica Arena, Jamaica, Queens, New York, U.S. | |
| 119 | Win | 77–30–12 | Georgie Day | TKO | 3 (8) | Oct 13, 1931 | Columbus Hall, Yonkers, New York, U.S. | |
| 118 | Win | 76–30–12 | Jimmy McNamara | KO | 1 (8) | Sep 10, 1931 | Polo Grounds, New York City, New York, U.S. | |
| 117 | Win | 75–30–12 | Danny Delmont | PTS | 10 | Sep 3, 1931 | Navin Field, Detroit, Michigan, U.S. | |
| 116 | Win | 74–30–12 | Eddie Shapiro | PTS | 6 | Aug 7, 1931 | Long Beach Stadium, Long Beach, New York, U.S. | |
| 115 | Win | 73–30–12 | Vince Maraconda | KO | 6 | Jul 24, 1931 | Long Beach Stadium, Long Beach, New York, U.S. | |
| 114 | Win | 72–30–12 | Danny Delmont | PTS | 10 | May 25, 1931 | Chicago Stadium, Chicago, Illinois, U.S. | |
| 113 | Loss | 71–30–12 | Lew Massey | PTS | 10 | Apr 6, 1931 | Arena, Philadelphia, Pennsylvania, U.S. | |
| 112 | Win | 71–29–12 | Johnny Jadick | KO | 1 (10) | Feb 20, 1931 | Olympia Stadium, Detroit, Michigan, U.S. | |
| 111 | Loss | 70–29–12 | Johnny Farr | PTS | 10 | Dec 10, 1930 | Public Hall, Cleveland, Ohio, U.S. | |
| 110 | Loss | 70–28–12 | Justo Suarez | PTS | 10 | Oct 3, 1930 | Madison Square Garden, New York City, New York, U.S. | |
| 109 | Win | 70–27–12 | Mike Sarko | KO | 3 (10) | Sep 8, 1930 | Dexter Park Arena, Woodhaven, Queens, New York, U.S. | |
| 108 | Win | 69–27–12 | Frankie Hayes | KO | 1 (6) | Jul 21, 1930 | Baker Bowl, Philadelphia, Pennsylvania, U.S. | |
| 107 | Win | 68–27–12 | Mike Sarko | PTS | 6 | Jul 4, 1930 | Long Beach Stadium, Long Beach, New York, U.S. | |
| 106 | Loss | 67–27–12 | Eddie Lord | PTS | 10 | Jun 30, 1930 | Industrial Mutual Association Auditorium, Flint, Michigan, U.S. | |
| 105 | Win | 67–26–12 | Sammy White | PTS | 10 | Jun 16, 1930 | Dexter Park Arena, Woodhaven, Queens, New York, U.S. | |
| 104 | Win | 66–26–12 | Eddie Koppy | TKO | 4 (10) | Apr 11, 1930 | Olympia Stadium, Detroit, Michigan, U.S. | |
| 103 | Win | 65–26–12 | Johnny Canzoneri | KO | 1 (10) | Apr 1, 1930 | Manhattan Auditorium, Allentown, Pennsylvania, U.S. | |
| 102 | Loss | 64–26–12 | Herman Follins | DQ | 8 | Feb 17, 1930 | Laurel Garden Arena, Newark, New Jersey, U.S. | |
| 101 | Loss | 64–25–12 | Bruce Flowers | PTS | 10 | Aug 12, 1929 | Arena, Philadelphia, Pennsylvania, U.S. | |
| 100 | Loss | 64–24–12 | Luis Vicentini | PTS | 10 | Aug 2, 1929 | Chicago Stadium, Chicago, Illinois, U.S. | |
| 99 | Win | 64–23–12 | Joey Abrams | PTS | 10 | Jul 23, 1929 | Woodcliff Park, Poughkeepsie, New York, U.S. | |
| 98 | Loss | 63–23–12 | Billy Petrolle | PTS | 10 | Jun 6, 1929 | Olympia Stadium, Detroit, Michigan, U.S. | |
| 97 | Win | 63–22–12 | Billy Petrolle | PTS | 10 | May 1, 1929 | Olympia Stadium, Detroit, Michigan, U.S. | |
| 96 | Loss | 62–22–12 | Jimmy McLarnin | UD | 10 | Mar 22, 1929 | Madison Square Garden, New York City, New York, U.S. | |
| 95 | Win | 62–21–12 | Tommy Grogan | PTS | 10 | Feb 1, 1929 | Olympia Stadium, Detroit, Michigan, U.S. | |
| 94 | Win | 61–21–12 | Tommy Grogan | KO | 4 (10) | Jan 11, 1929 | Olympia Stadium, Detroit, Michigan, U.S. | |
| 93 | Win | 60–21–12 | Jimmy McLarnin | RTD | 7 (10) | Nov 30, 1928 | Olympia Stadium, Detroit, Michigan, U.S. | |
| 92 | Win | 59–21–12 | Lope Tenorio | KO | 2 (10) | Nov 9, 1928 | Olympia Stadium, Detroit, Michigan, U.S. | |
| 91 | Loss | 58–21–12 | Nat Kawler | PTS | 6 | Oct 6, 1928 | Ridgewood Grove Arena, Queens, New York, U.S. | |
| 90 | Win | 58–20–12 | Freddie Mueller | PTS | 10 | Aug 24, 1928 | Olympia Stadium, Detroit, Michigan, U.S. | |
| 89 | Loss | 57–20–12 | King Tut | PTS | 10 | Aug 3, 1928 | Coney Island Stadium, Brooklyn, New York, U.S. | |
| 88 | Win | 57–19–12 | Sid Terris | KO | 1 (10) | Jul 6, 1928 | Coney Island Stadium, Brooklyn, New York, U.S. | |
| 87 | Loss | 56–19–12 | Freddie Mueller | PTS | 10 | May 31, 1928 | Mills Stadium, Chicago, Illinois, U.S. | |
| 86 | Win | 56–18–12 | Frankie Schaeffer | TKO | 7 (10) | Mar 23, 1928 | Coliseum, Chicago, Illinois, U.S. | |
| 85 | Win | 55–18–12 | Tommy Crowley | PTS | 4 | Feb 27, 1928 | Coliseum, Chicago, Illinois, U.S. | |
| 84 | Loss | 54–18–12 | Mike Dundee | PTS | 10 | Dec 19, 1927 | Coliseum, Chicago, Illinois, U.S. | |
| 83 | Win | 54–17–12 | Johnny Kochansky | PTS | 6 | Dec 10, 1927 | Ridgewood Grove Arena, Queens, New York, U.S. | |
| 82 | Loss | 53–17–12 | Pete Nebo | NWS | 10 | Dec 6, 1927 | Laurel Garden Arena, Newark, New Jersey, U.S. | |
| 81 | Loss | 53–16–12 | Johnny Hill | PTS | 10 | Feb 10, 1927 | Coliseum, Chicago, Illinois, U.S. | |
| 80 | Win | 53–15–12 | Eddie Shea | PTS | 10 | Jan 20, 1927 | Coliseum, Chicago, Illinois, U.S. | |
| 79 | Win | 52–15–12 | Mickey Chapin | TKO | 9 (10) | Dec 27, 1926 | Laurel Garden Arena, Newark, New Jersey, U.S. | |
| 78 | Loss | 51–15–12 | Jack Bernstein | PTS | 10 | Dec 13, 1926 | Madison Square Garden, New York City, New York, U.S. | |
| 77 | Win | 51–14–12 | Jackie Snyder | KO | 1 (10) | Nov 9, 1926 | Ashland Blvd. Auditorium, Chicago, Illinois, U.S. | |
| 76 | Loss | 50–14–12 | Jackie Snyder | DQ | 2 (10) | Oct 22, 1926 | Dexter Park Pavilion, Chicago, Illinois, U.S. | |
| 75 | Loss | 50–13–12 | Joey Sangor | NWS | 10 | Oct 1, 1926 | Auditorium, Milwaukee, Wisconsin, U.S. | |
| 74 | Loss | 50–12–12 | Johnny O'Donnell | NWS | 10 | Sep 13, 1926 | Auditorium, Saint Paul, Minnesota, U.S. | |
| 73 | Win | 50–11–12 | Joe Glick | NWS | 10 | Aug 26, 1926 | Mills Stadium, Chicago, Illinois, U.S. | |
| 72 | Loss | 49–11–12 | Joe Glick | PTS | 10 | Jul 24, 1926 | Coney Island Stadium, Brooklyn, New York, U.S. | |
| 71 | Draw | 49–10–12 | Billy Petrolle | PTS | 10 | Jul 2, 1926 | Coney Island Stadium, Brooklyn, New York, U.S. | |
| 70 | Loss | 49–10–11 | Leo (Kid) Roy | PTS | 10 | Jun 16, 1926 | Forum, Montreal, Quebec, Canada | |
| 69 | Win | 49–9–11 | Mike Dundee | PTS | 10 | Jun 11, 1926 | Coney Island Stadium, Brooklyn, New York, U.S. | |
| 68 | Win | 48–9–11 | Charley Goodman | PTS | 10 | May 24, 1926 | Dexter Park Arena, Woodhaven, Queens, New York, U.S. | |
| 67 | Loss | 47–9–11 | Jackie Snyder | PTS | 10 | Apr 26, 1926 | Broadway Arena, Brooklyn, New York, U.S. | |
| 66 | Win | 47–8–11 | Johnny Cooney | PTS | 10 | Apr 12, 1926 | Valley Arena, Holyoke, Massachusetts, U.S. | |
| 65 | Win | 46–8–11 | Jackie Snyder | KO | 2 (10) | Apr 5, 1926 | Broadway Arena, Brooklyn, New York, U.S. | |
| 64 | Loss | 45–8–11 | Dick Finnegan | PTS | 10 | Mar 19, 1926 | Mechanics Building, Boston, Massachusetts, U.S. | |
| 63 | Win | 45–7–11 | Bobby Garcia | PTS | 10 | Mar 8, 1926 | Valley Arena, Holyoke, Massachusetts, U.S. | |
| 62 | Win | 44–7–11 | Johnny Nichols | PTS | 10 | Jan 29, 1926 | Madison Square Garden, New York City, New York, U.S. | |
| 61 | Win | 43–7–11 | Joey Sangor | NWS | 10 | Oct 12, 1925 | Auditorium, Milwaukee, Wisconsin, U.S. | |
| 60 | Draw | 42–7–11 | Babe Herman | NWS | 10 | Sep 17, 1925 | Aurora Bowl, Aurora, Illinois, U.S. | |
| 59 | Win | 42–7–10 | Chick Suggs | NWS | 10 | Aug 31, 1925 | Aurora Bowl, Aurora, Illinois, U.S. | |
| 58 | Win | 41–7–10 | Frankie Schaeffer | DQ | 4 (10) | Aug 14, 1925 | Aurora Bowl, Aurora, Illinois, U.S. | |
| 57 | Win | 40–7–10 | Moe Ginsberg | TKO | 8 (10) | Jul 10, 1925 | East Chicago, Indiana, U.S. | |
| 56 | Loss | 39–7–10 | Johnny Farr | PTS | 10 | May 15, 1925 | Legion Stadium, Hollywood, California, U.S. | |
| 55 | Draw | 39–6–10 | Sammy Compagno | PTS | 10 | May 1, 1925 | Dreamland Rink, San Francisco, California, U.S. | |
| 54 | Win | 39–6–9 | Johnny Lamar | PTS | 10 | Apr 24, 1925 | Legion Stadium, Hollywood, California, U.S. | |
| 53 | Win | 38–6–9 | Teddy Seidman | PTS | 10 | Apr 15, 1925 | Wilmington Bowl, Wilmington, California, U.S. | |
| 52 | Win | 37–6–9 | Sammy Waltz | PTS | 6 | Mar 11, 1925 | Dreamland Arena, San Diego, California, U.S. | |
| 51 | Loss | 36–6–9 | California Joe Lynch | PTS | 8 | Feb 24, 1925 | Arena, Vernon, California, U.S. | |
| 50 | Draw | 36–5–9 | Joe Medina | PTS | 10 | Jan 28, 1925 | Dreamland Arena, San Diego, California, U.S. | |
| 49 | Win | 36–5–8 | Kid Norkus | NWS | 4 | Jan 23, 1925 | Coliseum, Davenport, Iowa, U.S. | |
| 48 | Win | 35–5–8 | Kid Worley | NWS | 10 | Jan 2, 1925 | Des Moines, Iowa, U.S. | |
| 47 | Win | 34–5–8 | Marty Silvers | PTS | 6 | Dec 13, 1924 | Ridgewood Grove Arena, Queens, New York, U.S. | |
| 46 | Win | 33–5–8 | Mick McAdam | PTS | 6 | Nov 15, 1924 | Ridgewood Grove Arena, Queens, New York, U.S. | |
| 45 | Win | 32–5–8 | Al Gordon | KO | 2 (10) | Sep 24, 1924 | Sager's Arena, Aurora, Illinois, U.S. | |
| 44 | Draw | 31–5–8 | Cowboy Eddie Anderson | NWS | 8 | Sep 9, 1924 | Open-air Arena, East Chicago, Indiana, U.S. | |
| 43 | Loss | 31–5–7 | Patsy Flanagan | NWS | 10 | Aug 22, 1924 | Sager's Arena, Aurora, Illinois, U.S. | |
| 42 | Win | 31–4–7 | Dandy Danny Dillon | TKO | 2 (10) | Aug 11, 1924 | Sager's Arena, Aurora, Illinois, U.S. | |
| 41 | Win | 30–4–7 | Solly Kessler | KO | 2 (6) | Jun 21, 1924 | Sager's Arena, Aurora, Illinois, U.S. | |
| 40 | Loss | 29–4–7 | Joe Azzarella | NWS | 6 | May 17, 1924 | Empress Theater, Milwaukee, Wisconsin, U.S. | |
| 39 | Draw | 29–3–7 | Joe Wyko | NWS | 10 | Apr 29, 1924 | Marinette, Wisconsin, U.S. | |
| 38 | Draw | 29–3–6 | Harold Plude | NWS | 8 | Apr 11, 1924 | Des Moines, Iowa, U.S. | |
| 37 | Win | 29–3–5 | Charlie Weber | NWS | 10 | Apr 5, 1924 | Empress Theater, Milwaukee, Wisconsin, U.S. | |
| 36 | Win | 28–3–5 | Artie Shiere | KO | 3 | Mar 14, 1924 | Marinette, Wisconsin, U.S. | |
| 35 | Draw | 27–3–5 | Harold Plude | NWS | 8 | Feb 8, 1924 | Des Moines, Iowa, U.S. | |
| 34 | Win | 27–3–4 | Ted Blatt | NWS | 6 | Jan 11, 1924 | Des Moines, Iowa, U.S. | |
| 33 | Loss | 26–3–4 | Walter Grayjack | NWS | 6 | Nov 26, 1923 | Auditorium, Milwaukee, Wisconsin, U.S. | |
| 32 | Win | 26–2–4 | Joey Kaufman | PTS | 6 | Nov 1, 1923 | Unknown | |
| 31 | Win | 25–2–4 | Billy Bunch | KO | 1 | Oct 29, 1923 | Arena Ice Gardens, Milwaukee, Wisconsin, U.S. | |
| 30 | Win | 24–2–4 | Dick Keller | PTS | 6 | Sep 28, 1923 | East Moline, Illinois, U.S. | |
| 29 | Loss | 23–2–4 | Ray Jeffries | DQ | 4 (8) | Sep 8, 1923 | Hawthorne Race Course, Chicago, Illinois, U.S. | |
| 28 | Loss | 23–1–4 | Artie Shiere | NWS | 8 | Sep 7, 1923 | Des Moines, Iowa, U.S. | |
| 27 | Win | 23–0–4 | Paul Milnar | PTS | 6 | Aug 23, 1923 | Perry, Iowa, U.S. | |
| 26 | Win | 22–0–4 | Billy Joyce | KO | 1 | Aug 21, 1923 | Des Moines, Iowa, U.S. | |
| 25 | Win | 21–0–4 | Frankie Smith | KO | 2 (6) | Aug 10, 1923 | Des Moines, Iowa, U.S. | |
| 24 | Win | 20–0–4 | Frankie Smith | KO | 2 (6) | Jul 27, 1923 | Auditorium, Des Moines, Iowa, U.S. | |
| 23 | Draw | 19–0–4 | Mike Brody | NWS | 6 | Jul 23, 1923 | Three Eyes Ballpark, Peoria, Illinois, U.S. | |
| 22 | Win | 19–0–3 | Billy Ellis | KO | 3 | Jun 15, 1923 | Palmer School Arena, Davenport, Iowa, U.S. | |
| 21 | Win | 18–0–3 | Young Michel | KO | 2 | May 3, 1923 | Unknown | |
| 20 | Win | 17–0–3 | Sailor Franklin | NWS | 6 | Mar 15, 1923 | Armour Post Club, Chicago, Illinois, U.S. | |
| 19 | Win | 16–0–3 | Maxie Epstein | NWS | 6 | Mar 9, 1923 | North Side Turner Hall, Chicago, Illinois, U.S. | |
| 18 | Win | 15–0–3 | Sonny Lloyd | NWS | 10 | Feb 10, 1923 | East Chicago, Indiana, U.S. | |
| 17 | Win | 14–0–3 | Ray Rychell | KO | 4 | Jan 10, 1923 | Unknown | |
| 16 | Win | 13–0–3 | Dick Keller | NWS | 4 | Dec 22, 1922 | Rock Island, Illinois, U.S. | |
| 15 | Win | 12–0–3 | Joe Wyko | PTS | 10 | Dec 17, 1922 | Unknown | |
| 14 | Win | 11–0–3 | Sonny Lloyd | NWS | 6 | Dec 7, 1922 | Chicago, Illinois, U.S. | |
| 13 | Win | 10–0–3 | Ray Jeffries | NWS | 6 | Nov 29, 1922 | Midway Arena, Chicago, Illinois, U.S. | |
| 12 | Draw | 9–0–3 | Ray Jeffries | NWS | 10 | Nov 16, 1922 | Private club, Chicago, Illinois, U.S. | |
| 11 | Win | 9–0–2 | Leo Lawlado | PTS | 6 | Nov 4, 1922 | Unknown | |
| 10 | Win | 9–0–2 | Dick Keller | NWS | 4 | Oct 27, 1922 | Coliseum, Davenport, Iowa, U.S. | |
| 9 | Win | 8–0–2 | Bobby Cooper | KO | 1 | Oct 4, 1922 | Unknown | |
| 8 | Win | 7–0–2 | Nat Farmer | KO | 2 | Oct 2, 1922 | Unknown | |
| 7 | Win | 6–0–2 | Joe Boyle | PTS | 8 | Oct 1, 1922 | Unknown | |
| 6 | Win | 5–0–2 | Elmer Jones | PTS | 4 | Sep 21, 1922 | Palmer School Arena, Davenport, Iowa, U.S. | |
| 5 | Win | 4–0–2 | Joe Schley | KO | 3 | Sep 3, 1922 | Unknown | |
| 4 | Win | 3–0–2 | Kid Sheldon | KO | 2 | Sep 2, 1922 | Unknown | |
| 3 | Win | 2–0–2 | Sammy Murphy | KO | 3 | Sep 1, 1922 | Unknown | |
| 2 | Draw | 1–0–2 | Dick Keller | NWS | 4 | Aug 3, 1922 | Owls Hall, Rock Island, Illinois, U.S. | |
| 1 | Draw | 1–0–1 | Dick Keller | NWS | 4 | Jul 21, 1922 | Palmer School Arena, Davenport, Iowa, U.S. | |

== See also ==
- List of male boxers
