= Billy Petrolle =

American boxer (1905–1983)

Personal information
- Nickname: The Fargo Express
- Born: William Michael Petrolle; January 10, 1905 Berwick, Pennsylvania, United States
- Died: May 14, 1983 (aged 78)
- Height: 5 ft 7 in (1.70 m)
- Weight: Lightweight

Boxing career
- Reach: 70 in (178 cm)
- Stance: Orthodox

Boxing record
- Total fights: 164
- Wins: 122
- Win by KO: 65
- Losses: 26
- Draws: 15
- No contests: 1

William Michael Petrolle (January 10, 1905 – May 14, 1983) was a world lightweight boxing title contender. Boxing ran in the Petrolle family as his brothers Pete and Frank also shared his occupation. Statistical boxing website BoxRec lists Petrolle as the #18 ranked lightweight of all-time. Petrolle is member of the Minnesota Boxing Hall of Fame, The Ring magazine Hall of Fame, the World Boxing Hall of Fame, and the International Boxing Hall of Fame.

In 2026, The Fight City named Petrolle an honorable mention in its ranking of the 12 greatest boxers never to have won a world title.

== Professional career ==
Nicknamed "The Fargo Express", Petrolle is perhaps best known for challenging World Lightweight Title holder Tony Canzoneri. In 1932 the two met for the World Lightweight Title, and Canzoneri was "squarely at his peak: a Canzoneri so magnificently conditioned, so beautifully attuned that even the old-timers at the ringside admitted he was worthy to stand alongside the lightweight giants of the past." (United Press). Petrolle dropped a decision in the bout at Madison Square Garden.

Petrolle was managed by promoter Jack Hurley.

== Life after boxing ==
Petrolle retired during the Great Depression with $200,000 and an iron foundry in Duluth, Minnesota. He later owned a religious goods and gift shop in Duluth, and was the chairman of the Board of Directors of the Pioneer National Bank.

== Honors ==
Petrolle has graced the covers of The Ring magazine in May 1927, March 1931, and May 1932. An article on him appeared in the July 2008 issue.

Petrolle is mentioned in the novel Catch-22 during the trial of Clevinger. The quote reads "In sixty days you'll be fighting Billy Petrolle," the colonel with the big fat mustache roared. "And you think it's a big fat joke." In this context "fighting Billy Petrolle" was a metaphor for facing combat in World War II.

== Professional boxing record ==
All information in this section is derived from BoxRec, unless otherwise stated.

=== Official record ===
164 fights	89 wins	21 losses
By knockout	65	3
By decision	19	18
By disqualification	5	0
Draws	10	
No contests	1	
Newspaper decisions/draws	43	

All newspaper decisions are officially regarded as “no decision” bouts and are not counted in the win/loss/draw column.

No.	Result	Record	Opponent	Type	Round, time	Date	Age	Location	Notes
164	Loss	89–21–10 (44)	Barney Ross	UD	10	Jan 24, 1934	29 years, 14 days	New York Coliseum, New York City, New York, U.S.	
163	Win	89–20–10 (44)	Stanislaus Loayza	TKO	6 (10)	Dec 12, 1933	28 years, 336 days	Ridgewood Grove, New York City, New York, U.S.	
162	Win	88–20–10 (44)	Sammy Fuller	UD	10	Oct 21, 1933	28 years, 284 days	Ridgewood Grove, New York City, New York, U.S.	
161	Draw	87–20–10 (44)	Sammy Fuller	PTS	10	Sep 8, 1933	28 years, 241 days	Boston Garden, Boston, Massachusetts, U.S.	
160	Win	87–20–9 (44)	Bep van Klaveren	RTD	4 (10)	Jul 12, 1933	28 years, 183 days	Polo Grounds, New York City, New York, U.S.	
159	Loss	86–20–9 (44)	Barney Ross	UD	10	Mar 22, 1933	28 years, 71 days	Chicago Stadium, Chicago, Illinois, U.S.	
158	Loss	86–19–9 (44)	Tony Canzoneri	UD	15	Nov 4, 1932	27 years, 299 days	Madison Square Garden, New York City, New York, U.S.	For NYSAC, NBA, and The Ring lightweight titles
157	Win	86–18–9 (44)	Tommy Grogan	UD	10	Jun 15, 1932	27 years, 157 days	Greenlee Field, Pittsburgh, Pennsylvania, U.S.	
156	Win	85–18–9 (44)	Christopher Battalino	UD	10	May 20, 1932	27 years, 131 days	Chicago Stadium, Chicago, Illinois, U.S.	
155	Win	84–18–9 (44)	Christopher Battalino	TKO	12 (12), 1:31	Mar 24, 1932	27 years, 74 days	Madison Square Garden, New York City, New York, U.S.	
154	Win	83–18–9 (44)	Eddie Ran	KO	6 (10)	Jan 22, 1932	27 years, 12 days	Madison Square Garden, New York City, New York, U.S.	
153	Win	82–18–9 (44)	Billy Townsend	KO	7 (10)	Dec 30, 1931	26 years, 354 days	Madison Square Garden, New York City, New York, U.S.	
152	Win	81–18–9 (44)	Iowa Joe Rivers	PTS	4	Nov 18, 1931	26 years, 312 days	Convention Hall, Kansas City, Missouri, U.S.	
151	Loss	80–18–9 (44)	Jimmy McLarnin	UD	10	Aug 20, 1931	26 years, 222 days	Yankee Stadium, New York City, New York, U.S.	
150	Win	80–17–9 (44)	Justo Suárez	KO	9 (10), 1:51	Jun 25, 1931	26 years, 166 days	Madison Square Garden, New York City, New York, U.S.	
149	Loss	79–17–9 (44)	Jimmy McLarnin	UD	10	May 27, 1931	26 years, 137 days	Madison Square Garden, New York City, New York, U.S.	
148	Win	79–16–9 (44)	Lope Tenorio	NWS	10	Apr 10, 1931	26 years, 90 days	Coliseum, Saint Louis, Missouri, U.S.	
147	Win	79–16–9 (43)	King Tut	KO	4 (10)	Feb 27, 1931	26 years, 48 days	Madison Square Garden, New York City, New York, U.S.	
146	Win	78–16–9 (43)	Jackie Moore	KO	1 (10)	Feb 6, 1931	26 years, 27 days	Memorial Coliseum, Cedar Rapids, Iowa, U.S.	
145	Loss	77–16–9 (43)	King Tut	KO	1 (10), 0:34	Feb 2, 1931	26 years, 23 days	Saint Paul, Minnesota, U.S.	
144	Win	77–15–9 (43)	Billy Light	NWS	6	Jan 1, 1931	25 years, 356 days	Fargo, North Dakota, U.S.	
143	Win	77–15–9 (42)	Jimmy McLarnin	UD	10	Nov 21, 1930	25 years, 315 days	Madison Square Garden, New York City, New York, U.S.	
142	Win	76–15–9 (42)	Spug Myers	NWS	6	Nov 7, 1930	25 years, 301 days	Armory, Duluth, Minnesota, U.S.	
141	Loss	76–15–9 (41)	Jack 'Kid' Berg	UD	10	Oct 10, 1930	25 years, 273 days	Madison Square Garden, New York City, New York, U.S.	For NBA and The Ring light welterweight titles
140	Win	76–14–9 (41)	Tony Canzoneri	PTS	10	Sep 11, 1930	25 years, 244 days	Chicago Stadium, Chicago, Illinois, U.S.	
139	Win	75–14–9 (41)	Doty Turner	KO	3 (10)	Sep 1, 1930	25 years, 234 days	Lake Kampeska Arena, Watertown, South Dakota, U.S.	
138	Win	74–14–9 (41)	Frankie LaFay	TKO	3 (12)	Aug 25, 1930	25 years, 227 days	Forest Park, Dayton, Ohio, U.S.	
137	Win	73–14–9 (41)	Paddy Walthier	KO	4 (10)	Aug 12, 1930	25 years, 214 days	Congress Outdoor Stadium, Chicago, Illinois, U.S.	
136	Win	72–14–9 (41)	Johnny Curtin	KO	5 (10)	Jul 28, 1930	25 years, 199 days	Forest Park, Dayton, Ohio, U.S.	
135	Win	71–14–9 (41)	Johnny Melton	PTS	10	Jul 25, 1930	25 years, 196 days	Arena, Schenectady, New York, U.S.	
134	Win	70–14–9 (41)	Izzy Kline	KO	2 (10)	Jul 11, 1930	25 years, 182 days	Calumet, Michigan, U.S.	
133	Win	69–14–9 (41)	Red Fry	TKO	1 (10)	May 29, 1930	25 years, 139 days	Avalon Arena, La Crosse, Wisconsin, U.S.	
132	Win	68–14–9 (41)	Tony Sanders	KO	1 (6)	Apr 26, 1930	25 years, 106 days	Fargo, North Dakota, U.S.	
131	Win	67–14–9 (41)	Joe Azzarella	KO	3 (10)	Apr 1, 1930	25 years, 81 days	Armory, Indianapolis, Indiana, U.S.	
130	Win	66–14–9 (41)	Jackie Kane	KO	9 (10)	Mar 11, 1930	25 years, 60 days	Avalon Arena, La Crosse, Wisconsin, U.S.	
129	Win	65–14–9 (41)	Joey Brooks	KO	3 (10)	Feb 17, 1930	25 years, 38 days	National Theater, Louisville, Kentucky, U.S.	
128	Loss	64–14–9 (41)	Jackie Purvis	NWS	10	Jan 28, 1930	25 years, 18 days	Armory, Indianapolis, Indiana, U.S.	
127	Loss	64–14–9 (40)	King Tut	PTS	10	Sep 12, 1929	24 years, 245 days	Navin Field, Detroit, Michigan, U.S.	
126	Win	64–13–9 (40)	Jimmy Goodrich	NWS	10	Jul 26, 1929	24 years, 197 days	Armory, Duluth, Minnesota, U.S.	
125	Win	64–13–9 (39)	Harry Kahn	DQ	3 (10)	Jul 22, 1929	24 years, 193 days	Janesville, Wisconsin, U.S.	Kahn was hit low and given 5 minutes to recover, but was DQ'd when he refused to continue
124	Win	63–13–9 (39)	Ray Miller	PTS	10	Jun 6, 1929	24 years, 147 days	Olympia Stadium, Detroit, Michigan, U.S.	
123	Loss	62–13–9 (39)	Ray Miller	PTS	10	May 1, 1929	24 years, 111 days	Olympia Stadium, Detroit, Michigan, U.S.	
122	Win	62–12–9 (39)	Norman Brown	TKO	4 (10)	Apr 9, 1929	24 years, 89 days	Sioux Falls, Iowa, U.S.	
121	Win	61–12–9 (39)	Bulldog Gonzalez	KO	2 (10)	Mar 20, 1929	24 years, 69 days	Dance Palace, Huron, South Dakota, U.S.	
120	Win	60–12–9 (39)	Jimmy Borde	NWS	10	Mar 15, 1929	24 years, 64 days	Armory, Duluth, Minnesota, U.S.	
119	Win	60–12–9 (38)	Tony Ross	TKO	4 (10)	Mar 1, 1929	24 years, 50 days	Grand Forks, North Dakota, U.S.	
118	Loss	59–12–9 (38)	King Tut	NWS	10	Oct 16, 1928	23 years, 280 days	Auditorium, Minneapolis, Minnesota, U.S.	
117	Win	59–12–9 (37)	Stanislaus Loayza	TKO	2 (10)	Sep 21, 1928	23 years, 255 days	Olympia Stadium, Detroit, Michigan, U.S.	
116	Win	58–12–9 (37)	Jack 'Kid' Berg	TKO	5 (10)	Aug 24, 1928	23 years, 227 days	Mills Stadium, Chicago, Illinois, U.S.	
115	Win	57–12–9 (37)	Jackie Kane	NWS	10	Aug 17, 1928	23 years, 220 days	Duluth, Minnesota, U.S.	
114	Draw	57–12–9 (36)	Jack 'Kid' Berg	PTS	10	Jul 26, 1928	23 years, 198 days	Mills Stadium, Chicago, Illinois, U.S.	
113	Win	57–12–8 (36)	Billy Engman	KO	3 (10)	Jul 12, 1928	23 years, 184 days	Aberdeen, South Dakota, U.S.	
112	Win	56–12–8 (36)	Al Rammy	KO	2 (?)	Jul 9, 1928	23 years, 181 days	Duluth, Minnesota, U.S.	
111	Draw	55–12–8 (36)	Doc Snell	PTS	6	Jun 29, 1928	23 years, 171 days	Dugdale Park, Seattle, Washington, U.S.	
110	Win	55–12–7 (36)	Bruce Flowers	PTS	10	Jun 21, 1928	23 years, 163 days	Olympia Stadium, Detroit, Michigan, U.S.	
109	Win	54–12–7 (36)	Jackie Kane	NWS	10	Jun 13, 1928	23 years, 155 days	Muehlebach Field, Kansas City, Missouri, U.S.	
108	Win	54–12–7 (35)	Armand Schaekels	KO	3 (10)	Jun 7, 1928	23 years, 149 days	Olympia Stadium, Detroit, Michigan, U.S.	
107	Win	53–12–7 (35)	Eddie Dwyer	KO	4 (10)	May 22, 1928	23 years, 133 days	Lake Kampeska Arena, Watertown, South Dakota, U.S.	
106	Loss	52–12–7 (35)	Tommy Grogan	TKO	7 (10)	Apr 27, 1928	23 years, 108 days	City Auditorium, Omaha, Nebraska, U.S.	
105	Loss	52–11–7 (35)	Bruce Flowers	PTS	10	Mar 16, 1928	23 years, 66 days	Madison Square Garden, New York City, New York, U.S.	
104	Win	52–10–7 (35)	Rusty Jones	KO	4 (10)	Feb 28, 1928	23 years, 49 days	Auditorium, Bismarck, North Dakota, U.S.	
103	Win	51–10–7 (35)	Spug Myers	PTS	10	Feb 24, 1928	23 years, 45 days	Olympia Stadium, Detroit, Michigan, U.S.	
102	Draw	50–10–7 (35)	Russie LeRoy	NWS	10	Feb 10, 1928	23 years, 31 days	Fargo, North Dakota, U.S.	
101	Loss	50–10–7 (34)	Sammy Mandell	NWS	10	Jan 13, 1928	23 years, 3 days	Auditorium, Minneapolis, Minnesota, U.S.	
100	Win	50–10–7 (33)	Cuddy DeMarco	RTD	7 (10)	Jan 2, 1928	22 years, 357 days	Fargo Auditorium, Fargo, North Dakota, U.S.	
99	Win	49–10–7 (33)	Harry Kahn	NWS	10	Dec 2, 1927	22 years, 326 days	Armory, Duluth, Minnesota, U.S.	
98	Loss	49–10–7 (32)	Tommy Herman	TKO	7 (10)	Sep 8, 1927	22 years, 241 days	Baker Bowl, Philadelphia, Pennsylvania, U.S.	
97	Win	49–9–7 (32)	Harry Kahn	NWS	10	Aug 26, 1927	22 years, 228 days	Auditorium, Milwaukee, Wisconsin, U.S.	
96	Win	49–9–7 (31)	Johnny Ceccoli	KO	6 (10)	Aug 19, 1927	22 years, 221 days	American Legion, West Springfield, Massachusetts, U.S.	
95	Win	48–9–7 (31)	King Tut	PTS	10	Aug 15, 1927	22 years, 217 days	New Hippodrome Arena, Saint Paul, Minnesota, U.S.	
94	Win	47–9–7 (31)	King Tut	DQ	4 (10)	Aug 2, 1927	22 years, 204 days	New Hippodrome Arena, Saint Paul, Minnesota, U.S.	Tut landed several low blows in the fourth round and Petrolle was in no shape to continue
93	Win	46–9–7 (31)	Eddie Brady	KO	1 (10), 0:46	Jul 19, 1927	22 years, 190 days	Fargo Auditorium, Fargo, North Dakota, U.S.	
92	Win	45–9–7 (31)	Basil Galiano	PTS	10	Jun 27, 1927	22 years, 168 days	Shibe Park, Philadelphia, Pennsylvania, U.S.	
91	Loss	44–9–7 (31)	Billy Wallace	PTS	10	Jun 15, 1927	22 years, 156 days	Polo Grounds, New York City, New York, U.S.	
90	Win	44–8–7 (31)	Jack Duffy	KO	1 (10), 2:43	May 26, 1927	22 years, 136 days	Armory, Akron, Ohio, U.S.	
89	Win	43–8–7 (31)	Johnny Hayes	TKO	5 (10)	May 2, 1927	22 years, 112 days	Arena, Philadelphia, Pennsylvania, U.S.	
88	NC	42–8–7 (31)	Cuddy DeMarco	NC	4 (10)	Apr 25, 1927	22 years, 105 days	Laurel Garden, Newark, New Jersey, U.S.	The referee stopped the fight believing the fighters to have made an agreement between themselves
87	Draw	42–8–7 (30)	Freddie Mueller	PTS	10	Apr 12, 1927	22 years, 92 days	Coliseum, Chicago, Illinois, U.S.	
86	Win	42–8–6 (30)	Joe Jawson	KO	7 (10)	Feb 25, 1927	22 years, 46 days	Sioux Falls Coliseum, Sioux Falls, Iowa, U.S.	
85	Win	41–8–6 (30)	Willie Ames	KO	3 (10)	Feb 11, 1927	22 years, 32 days	Duluth, Minnesota, U.S.	
84	Win	40–8–6 (30)	Frankie Frisco	KO	3 (10)	Feb 7, 1927	22 years, 28 days	Grand Forks, North Dakota, U.S.	
83	Draw	39–8–6 (30)	Spug Myers	PTS	10	Jan 20, 1927	22 years, 10 days	Coliseum, Chicago, Illinois, U.S.	
82	Win	39–8–5 (30)	Tommy Kid Murphy	KO	3 (10)	Jan 1, 1927	21 years, 356 days	Fargo Auditorium, Fargo, North Dakota, U.S.	
81	Win	38–8–5 (30)	Les Murray	TKO	3 (10)	Dec 20, 1926	21 years, 344 days	Auditorium, Milwaukee, Wisconsin, U.S.	
80	Draw	37–8–5 (30)	Cuddy DeMarco	PTS	6	Dec 6, 1926	21 years, 330 days	Broadway Arena, New York City, New York, U.S.	
79	Win	37–8–4 (30)	Johnny O'Donnell	TKO	2 (10), 0:47	Nov 26, 1926	21 years, 320 days	Auditorium, Saint Paul, Minnesota, U.S.	
78	Win	36–8–4 (30)	Billy Pollock	KO	1 (10), 0:47	Nov 8, 1926	21 years, 302 days	Laurel Garden, Newark, New Jersey, U.S.	
77	Win	35–8–4 (30)	Hilario Martínez	KO	2 (10), 2:12	Oct 29, 1926	21 years, 292 days	Madison Square Garden, New York City, New York, U.S.	
76	Win	34–8–4 (30)	Alf Simmons	NWS	10	Sep 10, 1926	21 years, 243 days	Fargo Auditorium, Fargo, North Dakota, U.S.	
75	Win	34–8–4 (29)	Ruby Stein	NWS	10	Aug 23, 1926	21 years, 225 days	Laurel Garden, Newark, New Jersey, U.S.	
74	Win	34–8–4 (28)	Johnny Ceccoli	NWS	10	Aug 2, 1926	21 years, 204 days	Newark, New Jersey, U.S.	
73	Win	34–8–4 (27)	Johnny Adams	KO	8 (10), 0:27	Jul 24, 1926	21 years, 195 days	Comiskey Park, Chicago, Illinois, U.S.	
72	Win	33–8–4 (27)	Johnny Rocco	KO	8 (10)	Jul 13, 1926	21 years, 184 days	Lexington Park, Saint Paul, Minnesota, U.S.	
71	Draw	32–8–4 (27)	Ray Miller	PTS	10	Jul 2, 1926	21 years, 173 days	Coney Island Stadium, New York City, New York, U.S.	
70	Win	32–8–3 (27)	Frankie Schaeffer	KO	1 (10), 2:10	Jun 21, 1926	21 years, 162 days	East Chicago, Indiana, U.S.	
69	Loss	31–8–3 (27)	Sid Terris	UD	10	Jun 11, 1926	21 years, 152 days	Coney Island Stadium, New York City, New York, U.S.	
68	Win	31–7–3 (27)	Danny Cooney	DQ	4 (10)	May 21, 1926	21 years, 131 days	Fargo Auditorium, Fargo, North Dakota, U.S.	Cooney landed two accidental low blows
67	Win	30–7–3 (27)	Joe Jawson	NWS	10	May 3, 1926	21 years, 113 days	Knights of Columbus Gym, Sioux City, Iowa, U.S.	
66	Loss	30–7–3 (26)	Louis 'Kid' Kaplan	PTS	12	Mar 1, 1926	21 years, 50 days	Foot Guard Hall, Hartford, Connecticut, U.S.	
65	Loss	30–6–3 (26)	Sammy Vogel	PTS	10	Feb 19, 1926	21 years, 40 days	Madison Square Garden, New York City, New York, U.S.	
64	Win	30–5–3 (26)	Eddie Wagner	KO	10 (10)	Feb 5, 1926	21 years, 26 days	Fargo Auditorium, Fargo, North Dakota, U.S.	
63	Loss	29–5–3 (26)	Charley Manty	PTS	12	Jan 7, 1926	20 years, 362 days	Foot Guard Hall, Hartford, Connecticut, U.S.	
62	Win	29–4–3 (26)	Steve Smith	PTS	12	Dec 17, 1925	20 years, 341 days	Foot Guard Hall, Hartford, Connecticut, U.S.	
61	Win	28–4–3 (26)	Joe Azzarella	KO	6 (8)	Dec 7, 1925	20 years, 331 days	Empress Theater, Milwaukee, Wisconsin, U.S.	
60	Win	27–4–3 (26)	Ruby Stein	PTS	10	Nov 20, 1925	20 years, 314 days	City Hall, Holyoke, Massachusetts, U.S.	
59	Loss	26–4–3 (26)	Johnny Drew	PTS	10	Nov 6, 1925	20 years, 300 days	City Hall, Holyoke, Massachusetts, U.S.	
58	Draw	26–3–3 (26)	Joe Jawson	NWS	10	Oct 29, 1925	20 years, 292 days	American Legion Hall, La Crosse, Wisconsin, U.S.	
57	Win	26–3–3 (25)	Red Cap Wilson	NWS	10	Oct 16, 1925	20 years, 279 days	Fargo Auditorium, Fargo, North Dakota, U.S.	
56	Win	26–3–3 (24)	Nick Lombardi	TKO	7 (?)	Sep 25, 1925	20 years, 258 days	Auditorium, Bismarck, North Dakota, U.S.	
55	Win	25–3–3 (24)	Carl Leonard	KO	3 (10), 0:13	Sep 7, 1925	20 years, 240 days	Maier Park, Vernon, California, U.S.	
54	Draw	24–3–3 (24)	Jimmy Hackley	PTS	6	Jul 28, 1925	20 years, 199 days	Maier Park, Vernon, California, U.S.	
53	Win	24–3–2 (24)	Johnny Lamar	DQ	3 (8)	Jul 7, 1925	20 years, 178 days	Arena, Vernon, California, U.S.	
52	Win	23–3–2 (24)	Frankie Fink	PTS	6	Jun 23, 1925	20 years, 164 days	Arena, Vernon, California, U.S.	
51	Win	22–3–2 (24)	Johnny Knauf	NWS	10	May 14, 1925	20 years, 124 days	Grand Forks, North Dakota, U.S.	
50	Win	22–3–2 (23)	Al Holzman	NWS	10	May 1, 1925	20 years, 111 days	Fargo Auditorium, Fargo, North Dakota, U.S.	
49	Win	22–3–2 (22)	Johnny Knauf	DQ	4 (?)	Apr 28, 1925	20 years, 108 days	Grand Forks, North Dakota, U.S.	
48	Win	21–3–2 (22)	Andy Tucker	PTS	10	Apr 21, 1925	20 years, 101 days	City Hall, Holyoke, Massachusetts, U.S.	
47	Loss	20–3–2 (22)	Bobby Garcia	PTS	10	Mar 23, 1925	20 years, 72 days	Arena, Philadelphia, Pennsylvania, U.S.	
46	Win	20–2–2 (22)	Al Shubert	PTS	10	Mar 13, 1925	20 years, 62 days	City Hall, Holyoke, Massachusetts, U.S.	
45	Loss	19–2–2 (22)	Babe Ruth	PTS	10	Mar 2, 1925	20 years, 51 days	Arena, Philadelphia, Pennsylvania, U.S.	
44	Win	19–1–2 (22)	Sylvio Mireault	KO	1 (10)	Feb 27, 1925	20 years, 48 days	City Hall, Holyoke, Massachusetts, U.S.	
43	Win	18–1–2 (22)	Reddy Blanchard	NWS	10	Jan 30, 1925	20 years, 20 days	Fargo Auditorium, Fargo, North Dakota, U.S.	
42	Win	18–1–2 (21)	Charley Raymond	NWS	10	Jan 16, 1925	20 years, 6 days	Minot, North Dakota, U.S.	
41	Win	18–1–2 (20)	Eddie Root	KO	3 (?)	Jan 1, 1925	19 years, 357 days	Fargo Auditorium, Fargo, North Dakota, U.S.	
40	Win	17–1–2 (20)	Gaston Charles	NWS	10	Dec 19, 1924	19 years, 344 days	Auditorium, Sioux City, Iowa, U.S.	
39	Win	17–1–2 (19)	Alex Novecky	NWS	10	Nov 28, 1924	19 years, 323 days	Fargo, North Dakota, U.S.	
38	Win	17–1–2 (18)	Battling Strayer	TKO	5 (10)	Nov 24, 1924	19 years, 319 days	Auditorium, Sioux City, Iowa, U.S.	
37	Win	16–1–2 (18)	Roscoe Hall	NWS	8	Nov 11, 1924	19 years, 306 days	Coliseum, Des Moines, Iowa, U.S.	
36	Draw	16–1–2 (17)	Johnny Schauer	NWS	8	Oct 31, 1924	19 years, 295 days	Fargo Auditorium, Fargo, North Dakota, U.S.	
35	Win	16–1–2 (16)	Tommy Tibbetts	KO	4 (10)	Oct 24, 1924	19 years, 288 days	Duluth, Minnesota, U.S.	
34	Win	15–1–2 (16)	Freddie Burke	KO	3 (?)	Sep 12, 1924	19 years, 246 days	Baker, Minnesota, U.S.	
33	Win	14–1–2 (16)	Rusty Jones	NWS	6	Aug 15, 1924	19 years, 218 days	Curling Rink Arena, Duluth, Minnesota, U.S.	
32	Win	14–1–2 (15)	Kid Worley	NWS	10	Jul 26, 1924	19 years, 198 days	Cudahy Recreation Hall, Sioux City, Iowa, U.S.	
31	Win	14–1–2 (14)	Pete Campi	PTS	8	Jul 23, 1924	19 years, 195 days	Milbank, South Dakota, U.S.	
30	Win	13–1–2 (14)	Billy O'Brien	KO	5 (?)	Jul 4, 1924	19 years, 176 days	Carrington, North Dakota, U.S.	
29	Draw	12–1–2 (14)	Jimmy Lundy	PTS	10	Jun 25, 1924	19 years, 167 days	Shrine Arena, Helena, Montana, U.S.	
28	Win	12–1–1 (14)	Joe McCabe	KO	4 (?)	Jun 6, 1924	19 years, 148 days	Fargo Auditorium, Fargo, North Dakota, U.S.	
27	Win	11–1–1 (14)	Len Schwabel	NWS	10	May 5, 1924	19 years, 116 days	Jamestown, North Dakota, U.S.	
26	Win	11–1–1 (13)	Rusty Jones	NWS	10	Apr 25, 1924	19 years, 106 days	Fargo, North Dakota, U.S.	
25	Loss	11–1–1 (12)	Rusty Jones	NWS	6	Apr 11, 1924	19 years, 92 days	Shrine Auditorium, Duluth, Minnesota, U.S.	
24	Win	11–1–1 (11)	Otto Wallace	NWS	10	Mar 24, 1924	19 years, 74 days	Fargo Auditorium, Fargo, North Dakota, U.S.	
23	Win	11–1–1 (10)	Sammy Leonard	NWS	6	Mar 13, 1924	19 years, 63 days	Athletic Club, Minneapolis, Minnesota, U.S.	
22	Win	11–1–1 (9)	Jimmy Moore	TKO	2 (6)	Mar 7, 1924	19 years, 57 days	Shrine Auditorium, Duluth, Minnesota, U.S.	
21	Win	10–1–1 (9)	Irish Kennedy	TKO	4 (?)	Feb 29, 1924	19 years, 50 days	Fargo Auditorium, Fargo, North Dakota, U.S.	
20	Win	9–1–1 (9)	Jack Moochie	NWS	8	Feb 1, 1924	19 years, 22 days	Fargo Auditorium, Fargo, North Dakota, U.S.	
19	Win	9–1–1 (8)	Jimmy Freyler	KO	3 (10)	Jan 22, 1924	19 years, 12 days	Shrine Arena, Helena, Montana, U.S.	
18	Win	8–1–1 (8)	Young Harry Runcorn	KO	1 (?), 0:56	Jan 17, 1924	19 years, 7 days	Moose Jaw, Saskatchewan, Canada	
17	Win	7–1–1 (8)	Sammy Rose	KO	2 (?)	Jan 5, 1924	18 years, 360 days	Havana, North Dakota, U.S.	
16	Win	6–1–1 (8)	Irish Kennedy	NWS	10	Jan 1, 1924	18 years, 356 days	Fargo Auditorium, Fargo, North Dakota, U.S.	
15	Win	6–1–1 (7)	Irish Kennedy	NWS	10	Nov 23, 1923	18 years, 317 days	Jamestown, North Dakota, U.S.	
14	Draw	6–1–1 (6)	Eddie DeBeau	PTS	10	Oct 23, 1923	18 years, 286 days	Sioux Falls, South Dakota, U.S.	
13	Win	6–1 (6)	Eddie DeBeau	NWS	10	Sep 19, 1923	18 years, 252 days	Jamestown, North Dakota, U.S.	
12	Win	6–1 (5)	Doc Snell	PTS	8	Aug 4, 1923	18 years, 206 days	Race Track, Alan, Idaho, U.S.	
11	Draw	5–1 (5)	Jackie Nichols	NWS	10	Jun 27, 1923	18 years, 168 days	Valley City Fairgrounds, Valley City, North Dakota, U.S.	
10	Win	5–1 (4)	Mike Ertle	KO	1 (10), 0:40	May 15, 1923	18 years, 125 days	Company H Armory, Jamestown, North Dakota, U.S.	
9	Draw	4–1 (4)	Jimmy Woodhall	NWS	6	Apr 6, 1923	18 years, 86 days	Fargo Auditorium, Fargo, North Dakota, U.S.	
8	Win	4–1 (3)	Jackie Nichols	NWS	10	Mar 6, 1923	18 years, 55 days	Company H Armory, Jamestown, North Dakota, U.S.	
7	Loss	4–1 (2)	Submarine Smith	NWS	8	Mar 3, 1923	18 years, 52 days	Detroit Lakes, Minnesota, U.S.	
6	Win	4–1 (1)	Lou Boomer	KO	1 (6), 1:56	Mar 1, 1923	18 years, 50 days	Fargo Auditorium, Fargo, North Dakota, U.S.	
5	Win	3–1 (1)	Johnny Gannon	KO	3 (?)	Feb 2, 1923	N/A	United States of America	Exact date and location unknown
4	Win	2–1 (1)	Submarine Smith	NWS	4	Jan 1, 1923	17 years, 356 days	Fargo Auditorium, Fargo, North Dakota, U.S.	
3	Win	2–1	Jackie Rose	KO	2 (6), 1:13	Dec 1, 1922	17 years, 325 days	Fargo Auditorium, Fargo, North Dakota, U.S.	
2	Win	1–1	Kid Fogarty	KO	2 (6)	Oct 27, 1922	17 years, 290 days	Fargo Auditorium, Fargo, North Dakota, U.S.	
1	Loss	0–1	Sammy Dorkins	PTS	4	May 8, 1922	17 years, 118 days	Bolton Hall, Troy, New York, U.S.	

=== Unofficial record ===
164 fights	122 wins	26 losses
By knockout	65	3
By decision	52	23
By disqualification	5	0
Draws	15	
No contests	1	

Record with the inclusion of newspaper decisions in the win/loss/draw column.

No.	Result	Record	Opponent	Type	Round, time	Date	Age	Location	Notes
164	Loss	122–26–15 (1)	Barney Ross	UD	10	Jan 24, 1934	29 years, 14 days	New York Coliseum, New York City, New York, U.S.	
163	Win	122–25–15 (1)	Stanislaus Loayza	TKO	6 (10)	Dec 12, 1933	28 years, 336 days	Ridgewood Grove, New York City, New York, U.S.	
162	Win	121–25–15 (1)	Sammy Fuller	UD	10	Oct 21, 1933	28 years, 284 days	Ridgewood Grove, New York City, New York, U.S.	
161	Draw	120–25–15 (1)	Sammy Fuller	PTS	10	Sep 8, 1933	28 years, 241 days	Boston Garden, Boston, Massachusetts, U.S.	
160	Win	120–25–14 (1)	Bep van Klaveren	RTD	4 (10)	Jul 12, 1933	28 years, 183 days	Polo Grounds, New York City, New York, U.S.	
159	Loss	119–25–14 (1)	Barney Ross	UD	10	Mar 22, 1933	28 years, 71 days	Chicago Stadium, Chicago, Illinois, U.S.	
158	Loss	119–24–14 (1)	Tony Canzoneri	UD	15	Nov 4, 1932	27 years, 299 days	Madison Square Garden, New York City, New York, U.S.	For NYSAC, NBA, and The Ring lightweight titles
157	Win	119–23–14 (1)	Tommy Grogan	UD	10	Jun 15, 1932	27 years, 157 days	Greenlee Field, Pittsburgh, Pennsylvania, U.S.	
156	Win	118–23–14 (1)	Christopher Battalino	UD	10	May 20, 1932	27 years, 131 days	Chicago Stadium, Chicago, Illinois, U.S.	
155	Win	117–23–14 (1)	Christopher Battalino	TKO	12 (12), 1:31	Mar 24, 1932	27 years, 74 days	Madison Square Garden, New York City, New York, U.S.	
154	Win	116–23–14 (1)	Eddie Ran	KO	6 (10)	Jan 22, 1932	27 years, 12 days	Madison Square Garden, New York City, New York, U.S.	
153	Win	115–23–14 (1)	Billy Townsend	KO	7 (10)	Dec 30, 1931	26 years, 354 days	Madison Square Garden, New York City, New York, U.S.	
152	Win	114–23–14 (1)	Iowa Joe Rivers	PTS	4	Nov 18, 1931	26 years, 312 days	Convention Hall, Kansas City, Missouri, U.S.	
151	Loss	113–23–14 (1)	Jimmy McLarnin	UD	10	Aug 20, 1931	26 years, 222 days	Yankee Stadium, New York City, New York, U.S.	
150	Win	113–22–14 (1)	Justo Suárez	KO	9 (10), 1:51	Jun 25, 1931	26 years, 166 days	Madison Square Garden, New York City, New York, U.S.	
149	Loss	112–22–14 (1)	Jimmy McLarnin	UD	10	May 27, 1931	26 years, 137 days	Madison Square Garden, New York City, New York, U.S.	
148	Win	112–21–14 (1)	Lope Tenorio	NWS	10	Apr 10, 1931	26 years, 90 days	Coliseum, Saint Louis, Missouri, U.S.	
147	Win	111–21–14 (1)	King Tut	KO	4 (10)	Feb 27, 1931	26 years, 48 days	Madison Square Garden, New York City, New York, U.S.	
146	Win	110–21–14 (1)	Jackie Moore	KO	1 (10)	Feb 6, 1931	26 years, 27 days	Memorial Coliseum, Cedar Rapids, Iowa, U.S.	
145	Loss	109–21–14 (1)	King Tut	KO	1 (10), 0:34	Feb 2, 1931	26 years, 23 days	Saint Paul, Minnesota, U.S.	
144	Win	109–20–14 (1)	Billy Light	NWS	6	Jan 1, 1931	25 years, 356 days	Fargo, North Dakota, U.S.	
143	Win	108–20–14 (1)	Jimmy McLarnin	UD	10	Nov 21, 1930	25 years, 315 days	Madison Square Garden, New York City, New York, U.S.	
142	Win	107–20–14 (1)	Spug Myers	NWS	6	Nov 7, 1930	25 years, 301 days	Armory, Duluth, Minnesota, U.S.	
141	Loss	106–20–14 (1)	Jack 'Kid' Berg	UD	10	Oct 10, 1930	25 years, 273 days	Madison Square Garden, New York City, New York, U.S.	For NBA and The Ring light welterweight titles
140	Win	106–19–14 (1)	Tony Canzoneri	PTS	10	Sep 11, 1930	25 years, 244 days	Chicago Stadium, Chicago, Illinois, U.S.	
139	Win	105–19–14 (1)	Doty Turner	KO	3 (10)	Sep 1, 1930	25 years, 234 days	Lake Kampeska Arena, Watertown, South Dakota, U.S.	
138	Win	104–19–14 (1)	Frankie LaFay	TKO	3 (12)	Aug 25, 1930	25 years, 227 days	Forest Park, Dayton, Ohio, U.S.	
137	Win	103–19–14 (1)	Paddy Walthier	KO	4 (10)	Aug 12, 1930	25 years, 214 days	Congress Outdoor Stadium, Chicago, Illinois, U.S.	
136	Win	102–19–14 (1)	Johnny Curtin	KO	5 (10)	Jul 28, 1930	25 years, 199 days	Forest Park, Dayton, Ohio, U.S.	
135	Win	101–19–14 (1)	Johnny Melton	PTS	10	Jul 25, 1930	25 years, 196 days	Arena, Schenectady, New York, U.S.	
134	Win	100–19–14 (1)	Izzy Kline	KO	2 (10)	Jul 11, 1930	25 years, 182 days	Calumet, Michigan, U.S.	
133	Win	99–19–14 (1)	Red Fry	TKO	1 (10)	May 29, 1930	25 years, 139 days	Avalon Arena, La Crosse, Wisconsin, U.S.	
132	Win	98–19–14 (1)	Tony Sanders	KO	1 (6)	Apr 26, 1930	25 years, 106 days	Fargo, North Dakota, U.S.	
131	Win	97–19–14 (1)	Joe Azzarella	KO	3 (10)	Apr 1, 1930	25 years, 81 days	Armory, Indianapolis, Indiana, U.S.	
130	Win	96–19–14 (1)	Jackie Kane	KO	9 (10)	Mar 11, 1930	25 years, 60 days	Avalon Arena, La Crosse, Wisconsin, U.S.	
129	Win	95–19–14 (1)	Joey Brooks	KO	3 (10)	Feb 17, 1930	25 years, 38 days	National Theater, Louisville, Kentucky, U.S.	
128	Loss	94–19–14 (1)	Jackie Purvis	NWS	10	Jan 28, 1930	25 years, 18 days	Armory, Indianapolis, Indiana, U.S.	
127	Loss	94–18–14 (1)	King Tut	PTS	10	Sep 12, 1929	24 years, 245 days	Navin Field, Detroit, Michigan, U.S.	
126	Win	94–17–14 (1)	Jimmy Goodrich	NWS	10	Jul 26, 1929	24 years, 197 days	Armory, Duluth, Minnesota, U.S.	
125	Win	93–17–14 (1)	Harry Kahn	DQ	3 (10)	Jul 22, 1929	24 years, 193 days	Janesville, Wisconsin, U.S.	Kahn was hit low and given 5 minutes to recover, but was DQ'd when he refused to continue
124	Win	92–17–14 (1)	Ray Miller	PTS	10	Jun 6, 1929	24 years, 147 days	Olympia Stadium, Detroit, Michigan, U.S.	
123	Loss	91–17–14 (1)	Ray Miller	PTS	10	May 1, 1929	24 years, 111 days	Olympia Stadium, Detroit, Michigan, U.S.	
122	Win	91–16–14 (1)	Norman Brown	TKO	4 (10)	Apr 9, 1929	24 years, 89 days	Sioux Falls, Iowa, U.S.	
121	Win	90–16–14 (1)	Bulldog Gonzalez	KO	2 (10)	Mar 20, 1929	24 years, 69 days	Dance Palace, Huron, South Dakota, U.S.	
120	Win	89–16–14 (1)	Jimmy Borde	NWS	10	Mar 15, 1929	24 years, 64 days	Armory, Duluth, Minnesota, U.S.	
119	Win	88–16–14 (1)	Tony Ross	TKO	4 (10)	Mar 1, 1929	24 years, 50 days	Grand Forks, North Dakota, U.S.	
118	Loss	87–16–14 (1)	King Tut	NWS	10	Oct 16, 1928	23 years, 280 days	Auditorium, Minneapolis, Minnesota, U.S.	
117	Win	87–15–14 (1)	Stanislaus Loayza	TKO	2 (10)	Sep 21, 1928	23 years, 255 days	Olympia Stadium, Detroit, Michigan, U.S.	
116	Win	86–15–14 (1)	Jack 'Kid' Berg	TKO	5 (10)	Aug 24, 1928	23 years, 227 days	Mills Stadium, Chicago, Illinois, U.S.	
115	Win	85–15–14 (1)	Jackie Kane	NWS	10	Aug 17, 1928	23 years, 220 days	Duluth, Minnesota, U.S.	
114	Draw	84–15–14 (1)	Jack 'Kid' Berg	PTS	10	Jul 26, 1928	23 years, 198 days	Mills Stadium, Chicago, Illinois, U.S.	
113	Win	84–15–13 (1)	Billy Engman	KO	3 (10)	Jul 12, 1928	23 years, 184 days	Aberdeen, South Dakota, U.S.	
112	Win	83–15–13 (1)	Al Rammy	KO	2 (?)	Jul 9, 1928	23 years, 181 days	Duluth, Minnesota, U.S.	
111	Draw	82–15–13 (1)	Doc Snell	PTS	6	Jun 29, 1928	23 years, 171 days	Dugdale Park, Seattle, Washington, U.S.	
110	Win	82–15–12 (1)	Bruce Flowers	PTS	10	Jun 21, 1928	23 years, 163 days	Olympia Stadium, Detroit, Michigan, U.S.	
109	Win	81–15–12 (1)	Jackie Kane	NWS	10	Jun 13, 1928	23 years, 155 days	Muehlebach Field, Kansas City, Missouri, U.S.	
108	Win	80–15–12 (1)	Armand Schaekels	KO	3 (10)	Jun 7, 1928	23 years, 149 days	Olympia Stadium, Detroit, Michigan, U.S.	
107	Win	79–15–12 (1)	Eddie Dwyer	KO	4 (10)	May 22, 1928	23 years, 133 days	Lake Kampeska Arena, Watertown, South Dakota, U.S.	
106	Loss	78–15–12 (1)	Tommy Grogan	TKO	7 (10)	Apr 27, 1928	23 years, 108 days	City Auditorium, Omaha, Nebraska, U.S.	
105	Loss	78–14–12 (1)	Bruce Flowers	PTS	10	Mar 16, 1928	23 years, 66 days	Madison Square Garden, New York City, New York, U.S.	
104	Win	78–13–12 (1)	Rusty Jones	KO	4 (10)	Feb 28, 1928	23 years, 49 days	Auditorium, Bismarck, North Dakota, U.S.	
103	Win	77–13–12 (1)	Spug Myers	PTS	10	Feb 24, 1928	23 years, 45 days	Olympia Stadium, Detroit, Michigan, U.S.	
102	Draw	76–13–12 (1)	Russie LeRoy	NWS	10	Feb 10, 1928	23 years, 31 days	Fargo, North Dakota, U.S.	
101	Loss	76–13–11 (1)	Sammy Mandell	NWS	10	Jan 13, 1928	23 years, 3 days	Auditorium, Minneapolis, Minnesota, U.S.	
100	Win	76–12–11 (1)	Cuddy DeMarco	RTD	7 (10)	Jan 2, 1928	22 years, 357 days	Fargo Auditorium, Fargo, North Dakota, U.S.	
99	Win	75–12–11 (1)	Harry Kahn	NWS	10	Dec 2, 1927	22 years, 326 days	Armory, Duluth, Minnesota, U.S.	
98	Loss	74–12–11 (1)	Tommy Herman	TKO	7 (10)	Sep 8, 1927	22 years, 241 days	Baker Bowl, Philadelphia, Pennsylvania, U.S.	
97	Win	74–11–11 (1)	Harry Kahn	NWS	10	Aug 26, 1927	22 years, 228 days	Auditorium, Milwaukee, Wisconsin, U.S.	
96	Win	73–11–11 (1)	Johnny Ceccoli	KO	6 (10)	Aug 19, 1927	22 years, 221 days	American Legion, West Springfield, Massachusetts, U.S.	
95	Win	72–11–11 (1)	King Tut	PTS	10	Aug 15, 1927	22 years, 217 days	New Hippodrome Arena, Saint Paul, Minnesota, U.S.	
94	Win	71–11–11 (1)	King Tut	DQ	4 (10)	Aug 2, 1927	22 years, 204 days	New Hippodrome Arena, Saint Paul, Minnesota, U.S.	Tut landed several low blows in the fourth round and Petrolle was in no shape to continue
93	Win	70–11–11 (1)	Eddie Brady	KO	1 (10), 0:46	Jul 19, 1927	22 years, 190 days	Fargo Auditorium, Fargo, North Dakota, U.S.	
92	Win	69–11–11 (1)	Basil Galiano	PTS	10	Jun 27, 1927	22 years, 168 days	Shibe Park, Philadelphia, Pennsylvania, U.S.	
91	Loss	68–11–11 (1)	Billy Wallace	PTS	10	Jun 15, 1927	22 years, 156 days	Polo Grounds, New York City, New York, U.S.	
90	Win	68–10–11 (1)	Jack Duffy	KO	1 (10), 2:43	May 26, 1927	22 years, 136 days	Armory, Akron, Ohio, U.S.	
89	Win	67–10–11 (1)	Johnny Hayes	TKO	5 (10)	May 2, 1927	22 years, 112 days	Arena, Philadelphia, Pennsylvania, U.S.	
88	NC	66–10–11 (1)	Cuddy DeMarco	NC	4 (10)	Apr 25, 1927	22 years, 105 days	Laurel Garden, Newark, New Jersey, U.S.	The referee stopped the fight believing the fighters to have made an agreement between themselves
87	Draw	66–10–11	Freddie Mueller	PTS	10	Apr 12, 1927	22 years, 92 days	Coliseum, Chicago, Illinois, U.S.	
86	Win	66–10–10	Joe Jawson	KO	7 (10)	Feb 25, 1927	22 years, 46 days	Sioux Falls Coliseum, Sioux Falls, Iowa, U.S.	
85	Win	65–10–10	Willie Ames	KO	3 (10)	Feb 11, 1927	22 years, 32 days	Duluth, Minnesota, U.S.	
84	Win	64–10–10	Frankie Frisco	KO	3 (10)	Feb 7, 1927	22 years, 28 days	Grand Forks, North Dakota, U.S.	
83	Draw	63–10–10	Spug Myers	PTS	10	Jan 20, 1927	22 years, 10 days	Coliseum, Chicago, Illinois, U.S.	
82	Win	63–10–9	Tommy Kid Murphy	KO	3 (10)	Jan 1, 1927	21 years, 356 days	Fargo Auditorium, Fargo, North Dakota, U.S.	
81	Win	62–10–9	Les Murray	TKO	3 (10)	Dec 20, 1926	21 years, 344 days	Auditorium, Milwaukee, Wisconsin, U.S.	
80	Draw	61–10–9	Cuddy DeMarco	PTS	6	Dec 6, 1926	21 years, 330 days	Broadway Arena, New York City, New York, U.S.	
79	Win	61–10–8	Johnny O'Donnell	TKO	2 (10), 0:47	Nov 26, 1926	21 years, 320 days	Auditorium, Saint Paul, Minnesota, U.S.	
78	Win	60–10–8	Billy Pollock	KO	1 (10), 0:47	Nov 8, 1926	21 years, 302 days	Laurel Garden, Newark, New Jersey, U.S.	
77	Win	59–10–8	Hilario Martínez	KO	2 (10), 2:12	Oct 29, 1926	21 years, 292 days	Madison Square Garden, New York City, New York, U.S.	
76	Win	58–10–8	Alf Simmons	NWS	10	Sep 10, 1926	21 years, 243 days	Fargo Auditorium, Fargo, North Dakota, U.S.	
75	Win	57–10–8	Ruby Stein	NWS	10	Aug 23, 1926	21 years, 225 days	Laurel Garden, Newark, New Jersey, U.S.	
74	Win	56–10–8	Johnny Ceccoli	NWS	10	Aug 2, 1926	21 years, 204 days	Newark, New Jersey, U.S.	
73	Win	55–10–8	Johnny Adams	KO	8 (10), 0:27	Jul 24, 1926	21 years, 195 days	Comiskey Park, Chicago, Illinois, U.S.	
72	Win	54–10–8	Johnny Rocco	KO	8 (10)	Jul 13, 1926	21 years, 184 days	Lexington Park, Saint Paul, Minnesota, U.S.	
71	Draw	53–10–8	Ray Miller	PTS	10	Jul 2, 1926	21 years, 173 days	Coney Island Stadium, New York City, New York, U.S.	
70	Win	53–10–7	Frankie Schaeffer	KO	1 (10), 2:10	Jun 21, 1926	21 years, 162 days	East Chicago, Indiana, U.S.	
69	Loss	52–10–7	Sid Terris	UD	10	Jun 11, 1926	21 years, 152 days	Coney Island Stadium, New York City, New York, U.S.	
68	Win	52–9–7	Danny Cooney	DQ	4 (10)	May 21, 1926	21 years, 131 days	Fargo Auditorium, Fargo, North Dakota, U.S.	Cooney landed two accidental low blows
67	Win	51–9–7	Joe Jawson	NWS	10	May 3, 1926	21 years, 113 days	Knights of Columbus Gym, Sioux City, Iowa, U.S.	
66	Loss	50–9–7	Louis 'Kid' Kaplan	PTS	12	Mar 1, 1926	21 years, 50 days	Foot Guard Hall, Hartford, Connecticut, U.S.	
65	Loss	50–8–7	Sammy Vogel	PTS	10	Feb 19, 1926	21 years, 40 days	Madison Square Garden, New York City, New York, U.S.	
64	Win	50–7–7	Eddie Wagner	KO	10 (10)	Feb 5, 1926	21 years, 26 days	Fargo Auditorium, Fargo, North Dakota, U.S.	
63	Loss	49–7–7	Charley Manty	PTS	12	Jan 7, 1926	20 years, 362 days	Foot Guard Hall, Hartford, Connecticut, U.S.	
62	Win	49–6–7	Steve Smith	PTS	12	Dec 17, 1925	20 years, 341 days	Foot Guard Hall, Hartford, Connecticut, U.S.	
61	Win	48–6–7	Joe Azzarella	KO	6 (8)	Dec 7, 1925	20 years, 331 days	Empress Theater, Milwaukee, Wisconsin, U.S.	
60	Win	47–6–7	Ruby Stein	PTS	10	Nov 20, 1925	20 years, 314 days	City Hall, Holyoke, Massachusetts, U.S.	
59	Loss	46–6–7	Johnny Drew	PTS	10	Nov 6, 1925	20 years, 300 days	City Hall, Holyoke, Massachusetts, U.S.	
58	Draw	46–5–7	Joe Jawson	NWS	10	Oct 29, 1925	20 years, 292 days	American Legion Hall, La Crosse, Wisconsin, U.S.	
57	Win	46–5–6	Red Cap Wilson	NWS	10	Oct 16, 1925	20 years, 279 days	Fargo Auditorium, Fargo, North Dakota, U.S.	
56	Win	45–5–6	Nick Lombardi	TKO	7 (?)	Sep 25, 1925	20 years, 258 days	Auditorium, Bismarck, North Dakota, U.S.	
55	Win	44–5–6	Carl Leonard	KO	3 (10), 0:13	Sep 7, 1925	20 years, 240 days	Maier Park, Vernon, California, U.S.	
54	Draw	43–5–6	Jimmy Hackley	PTS	6	Jul 28, 1925	20 years, 199 days	Maier Park, Vernon, California, U.S.	
53	Win	43–5–5	Johnny Lamar	DQ	3 (8)	Jul 7, 1925	20 years, 178 days	Arena, Vernon, California, U.S.	
52	Win	42–5–5	Frankie Fink	PTS	6	Jun 23, 1925	20 years, 164 days	Arena, Vernon, California, U.S.	
51	Win	41–5–5	Johnny Knauf	NWS	10	May 14, 1925	20 years, 124 days	Grand Forks, North Dakota, U.S.	
50	Win	40–5–5	Al Holzman	NWS	10	May 1, 1925	20 years, 111 days	Fargo Auditorium, Fargo, North Dakota, U.S.	
49	Win	39–5–5	Johnny Knauf	DQ	4 (?)	Apr 28, 1925	20 years, 108 days	Grand Forks, North Dakota, U.S.	
48	Win	38–5–5	Andy Tucker	PTS	10	Apr 21, 1925	20 years, 101 days	City Hall, Holyoke, Massachusetts, U.S.	
47	Loss	37–5–5	Bobby Garcia	PTS	10	Mar 23, 1925	20 years, 72 days	Arena, Philadelphia, Pennsylvania, U.S.	
46	Win	37–4–5	Al Shubert	PTS	10	Mar 13, 1925	20 years, 62 days	City Hall, Holyoke, Massachusetts, U.S.	
45	Loss	36–4–5	Babe Ruth	PTS	10	Mar 2, 1925	20 years, 51 days	Arena, Philadelphia, Pennsylvania, U.S.	
44	Win	36–3–5	Sylvio Mireault	KO	1 (10)	Feb 27, 1925	20 years, 48 days	City Hall, Holyoke, Massachusetts, U.S.	
43	Win	35–3–5	Reddy Blanchard	NWS	10	Jan 30, 1925	20 years, 20 days	Fargo Auditorium, Fargo, North Dakota, U.S.	
42	Win	34–3–5	Charley Raymond	NWS	10	Jan 16, 1925	20 years, 6 days	Minot, North Dakota, U.S.	
41	Win	33–3–5	Eddie Root	KO	3 (?)	Jan 1, 1925	19 years, 357 days	Fargo Auditorium, Fargo, North Dakota, U.S.	
40	Win	32–3–5	Gaston Charles	NWS	10	Dec 19, 1924	19 years, 344 days	Auditorium, Sioux City, Iowa, U.S.	
39	Win	31–3–5	Alex Novecky	NWS	10	Nov 28, 1924	19 years, 323 days	Fargo, North Dakota, U.S.	
38	Win	30–3–5	Battling Strayer	TKO	5 (10)	Nov 24, 1924	19 years, 319 days	Auditorium, Sioux City, Iowa, U.S.	
37	Win	29–3–5	Roscoe Hall	NWS	8	Nov 11, 1924	19 years, 306 days	Coliseum, Des Moines, Iowa, U.S.	
36	Draw	28–3–5	Johnny Schauer	NWS	8	Oct 31, 1924	19 years, 295 days	Fargo Auditorium, Fargo, North Dakota, U.S.	
35	Win	28–3–4	Tommy Tibbetts	KO	4 (10)	Oct 24, 1924	19 years, 288 days	Duluth, Minnesota, U.S.	
34	Win	27–3–4	Freddie Burke	KO	3 (?)	Sep 12, 1924	19 years, 246 days	Baker, Minnesota, U.S.	
33	Win	26–3–4	Rusty Jones	NWS	6	Aug 15, 1924	19 years, 218 days	Curling Rink Arena, Duluth, Minnesota, U.S.	
32	Win	25–3–4	Kid Worley	NWS	10	Jul 26, 1924	19 years, 198 days	Cudahy Recreation Hall, Sioux City, Iowa, U.S.	
31	Win	24–3–4	Pete Campi	PTS	8	Jul 23, 1924	19 years, 195 days	Milbank, South Dakota, U.S.	
30	Win	23–3–4	Billy O'Brien	KO	5 (?)	Jul 4, 1924	19 years, 176 days	Carrington, North Dakota, U.S.	
29	Draw	22–3–4	Jimmy Lundy	PTS	10	Jun 25, 1924	19 years, 167 days	Shrine Arena, Helena, Montana, U.S.	
28	Win	22–3–3	Joe McCabe	KO	4 (?)	Jun 6, 1924	19 years, 148 days	Fargo Auditorium, Fargo, North Dakota, U.S.	
27	Win	21–3–3	Len Schwabel	NWS	10	May 5, 1924	19 years, 116 days	Jamestown, North Dakota, U.S.	
26	Win	20–3–3	Rusty Jones	NWS	10	Apr 25, 1924	19 years, 106 days	Fargo, North Dakota, U.S.	
25	Loss	19–3–3	Rusty Jones	NWS	6	Apr 11, 1924	19 years, 92 days	Shrine Auditorium, Duluth, Minnesota, U.S.	
24	Win	19–2–3	Otto Wallace	NWS	10	Mar 24, 1924	19 years, 74 days	Fargo Auditorium, Fargo, North Dakota, U.S.	
23	Win	18–2–3	Sammy Leonard	NWS	6	Mar 13, 1924	19 years, 63 days	Athletic Club, Minneapolis, Minnesota, U.S.	
22	Win	17–2–3	Jimmy Moore	TKO	2 (6)	Mar 7, 1924	19 years, 57 days	Shrine Auditorium, Duluth, Minnesota, U.S.	
21	Win	16–2–3	Irish Kennedy	TKO	4 (?)	Feb 29, 1924	19 years, 50 days	Fargo Auditorium, Fargo, North Dakota, U.S.	
20	Win	15–2–3	Jack Moochie	NWS	8	Feb 1, 1924	19 years, 22 days	Fargo Auditorium, Fargo, North Dakota, U.S.	
19	Win	14–2–3	Jimmy Freyler	KO	3 (10)	Jan 22, 1924	19 years, 12 days	Shrine Arena, Helena, Montana, U.S.	
18	Win	13–2–3	Young Harry Runcorn	KO	1 (?), 0:56	Jan 17, 1924	19 years, 7 days	Moose Jaw, Saskatchewan, Canada	
17	Win	12–2–3	Sammy Rose	KO	2 (?)	Jan 5, 1924	18 years, 360 days	Havana, North Dakota, U.S.	
16	Win	11–2–3	Irish Kennedy	NWS	10	Jan 1, 1924	18 years, 356 days	Fargo Auditorium, Fargo, North Dakota, U.S.	
15	Win	10–2–3	Irish Kennedy	NWS	10	Nov 23, 1923	18 years, 317 days	Jamestown, North Dakota, U.S.	
14	Draw	9–2–3	Eddie DeBeau	PTS	10	Oct 23, 1923	18 years, 286 days	Sioux Falls, South Dakota, U.S.	
13	Win	9–2–2	Eddie DeBeau	NWS	10	Sep 19, 1923	18 years, 252 days	Jamestown, North Dakota, U.S.	
12	Win	8–2–2	Doc Snell	PTS	8	Aug 4, 1923	18 years, 206 days	Race Track, Alan, Idaho, U.S.	
11	Draw	7–2–2	Jackie Nichols	NWS	10	Jun 27, 1923	18 years, 168 days	Valley City Fairgrounds, Valley City, North Dakota, U.S.	
10	Win	7–2–1	Mike Ertle	KO	1 (10), 0:40	May 15, 1923	18 years, 125 days	Company H Armory, Jamestown, North Dakota, U.S.	
9	Draw	6–2–1	Jimmy Woodhall	NWS	6	Apr 6, 1923	18 years, 86 days	Fargo Auditorium, Fargo, North Dakota, U.S.	
8	Win	6–2	Jackie Nichols	NWS	10	Mar 6, 1923	18 years, 55 days	Company H Armory, Jamestown, North Dakota, U.S.	
7	Loss	5–2	Submarine Smith	NWS	8	Mar 3, 1923	18 years, 52 days	Detroit Lakes, Minnesota, U.S.	
6	Win	5–1	Lou Boomer	KO	1 (6), 1:56	Mar 1, 1923	18 years, 50 days	Fargo Auditorium, Fargo, North Dakota, U.S.	
5	Win	4–1	Johnny Gannon	KO	3 (?)	Feb 2, 1923	N/A	United States of America	Exact date and location unknown
4	Win	3–1	Submarine Smith	NWS	4	Jan 1, 1923	17 years, 356 days	Fargo Auditorium, Fargo, North Dakota, U.S.	
3	Win	2–1	Jackie Rose	KO	2 (6), 1:13	Dec 1, 1922	17 years, 325 days	Fargo Auditorium, Fargo, North Dakota, U.S.	
2	Win	1–1	Kid Fogarty	KO	2 (6)	Oct 27, 1922	17 years, 290 days	Fargo Auditorium, Fargo, North Dakota, U.S.	
1	Loss	0–1	Sammy Dorkins	PTS	4	May 8, 922	17 years, 118 days	Bolton Hall, Troy, New York, U.S.	
