= Jimmy McLarnin =

Irish-Canadian boxer (1907–2004)

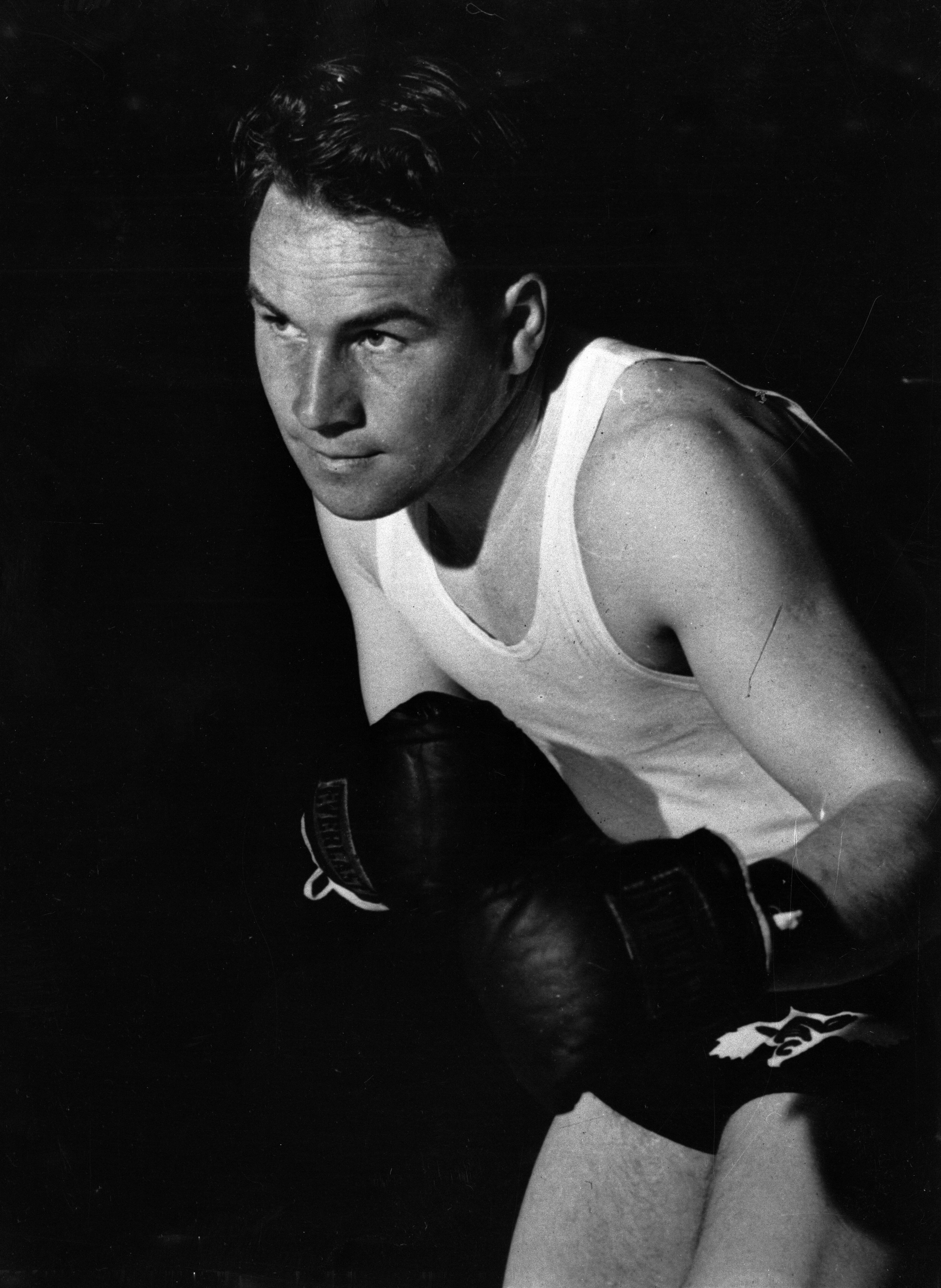

Personal information
- Nicknames: Baby Face; Beltin' Celt; Dublin Dynamiter; Dublin Destroyer; Murderous Mick; The Belfast Spider; The Jew Killer; The Jew Beater; Hebrew Scourge; The Irish Lullaby
- Nationality: Irish (Note: British citizen from 1907 to 1922 and Irish citizen from 1922 to his death. Ireland was part of the United Kingdom until 1922.); Canadian
- Born: James Archibald McLarnin; 19 December 1907 Hillsborough, Ireland, U.K. (nowadays Royal Hillsborough, Northern Ireland, U.K.)
- Died: 28 October 2004 (aged 96) Richland, Washington, U.S.
- Height: 5 ft 6 in (1.68 m)
- Weight: Flyweight; Bantamweight; Lightweight; Welterweight

Boxing career
- Reach: 67 in (170 cm)
- Stance: Orthodox

Boxing record
- Total fights: 69
- Wins: 55
- Win by KO: 21
- Losses: 11
- Draws: 3

James Archibald McLarnin (19 December 1907 – 28 October 2004) was an Irish-Canadian professional boxer who became a two-time Undisputed Welterweight World Champion. He was inducted into The Ring magazine Hall of Fame in 1956, the inaugural World Boxing Hall of Fame in 1980, and the International Boxing Hall of Fame in 1991.

As of 2026, BoxRec ranked McLarnin as the second-greatest pound-for-pound boxer of all time, behind only Sugar Ray Robinson, as well as the greatest Canadian boxer and welterweight of all time.

== Background ==
There was often confusion over McLarnin's exact place of birth and his date of birth. McLarnin himself was unsure as to the exact location and at various times claimed to be born in Inchicore, Dublin, in modern-day Ireland, or the Lisburn Road in Belfast, Ireland, modern day Northern Ireland. Adding to the confusion he went by nicknames the Dublin Destroyer and Belfast Spider. It was Irish boxing historian Patrick Myler who later unearthed McLarnin's birth certificate which showed that McLarnin was born in Hillsborough, County Down, Ireland in 1907.

McLarnin's father, Sam McLarnin, a Methodist from Dublin, was described as 'a typical Dublin Irishman' and traveled throughout Britain and Ireland for work as a butcher. He later married Mary Ferris from Belfast and they settled in County Down before being drawn into Belfast. When McLarnin was two years of age the whole family emigrated to Saskatchewan, Canada via Liverpool. The McLarnins started out as a wheat farmers, but years later, at the age of 10 and following a particularly harsh winter, the family moved to Vancouver where they opened a second-hand clothes store in Vancouver's east end.

McLarnin was a prodigious athlete, his main sports were football, baseball and boxing and was considered a model of propriety by Rev. A.E. Roberts at the Methodist mission in Vancouver. He took up boxing at the age of 10 after getting into a fight defending his newspaper-selling pitch. Former professional boxer Charles "Pop" Foster recognized McLarnin's talent at the age of 13. He constructed a makeshift gym for McLarnin to train in, sure that he would one day be the champion of the world. The two of them would remain close, and when Foster died, he left everything he had to McLarnin.

== Boxing career ==
Following a successful start to his career in Vancouver, McLarnin grew aggrieved at the low pay he was receiving for bouts and decided to move south. "We had to go to the United States to make our money. We owe Vancouver nothing" said McLarnin.

When McLarnin was 16, Foster took him to San Francisco, where his youthful appearance made it difficult to get a fight until he lied about his age. It is for this reason that McLarnin was known as the "Baby-faced Assassin". Despite his youthful appearance, McLarnin had incredible power with both fists, his right being particularly feared. However, like many similar fighters McLarnin suffered several hand injuries throughout his career. Towards the end of his career McLarnin was forced to become more of a scientific boxer to reduce further injuries to his hands.

McLarnin lost his first title shot on 21 May 1928 in New York against world lightweight champion Sammy Mandell. However, he did go on to beat him twice in the following two years. It would be five years before McLarnin would next get a title shot, during which time he knocked out Al Singer, Ruby Goldstein, and Sid Terris.

McLarnin's second title shot came against welterweight champion Young Corbett III. McLarnin won by knockout after only 2 minutes 37 seconds. Following his title success, McLarnin fought an epic three-fight series with Barney Ross. The first fight, on 28 May 1934, was won by Ross, but McLarnin regained his title in their next match four months later. In the deciding fight on 28 May 1935, McLarnin lost his title for the final time in a narrow decision.

McLarnin retired in November 1936 still at the top of his game, having won his last two fights against all-time greats Tony Canzoneri and Lou Ambers. His record was 54 wins, 11 losses, and 3 draws in 68 contests. In 1996 Ring Magazine voted McLarnin the fifth-greatest welterweight of all time.

== Life after boxing ==
McLarnin never returned to the ring despite large incentives for him to do so. Unlike many boxers, McLarnin invested his money wisely and retired a wealthy man. He opened an electrical goods store, and also did some acting, golfing, and lecturing.

In 1937, he appeared with boxers Maxie Rosenbloom, James J. Jeffries, Jack Dempsey, and Jackie Fields, in MGM's Big City, a film involving rough competition between two rival taxi companies.

In 1938, he appeared in a background gymnasium scene for the successful 1938, MGM boxing movie, The Crowd Roars with boxers Abe "The Newsboy" Hollandersky, Joe Glick, Maxie Rosenbloom, Jack Roper, and Tommy Herman.

In 1946, he appeared in Monogram Pictures' boxing movie, Joe Palooka, Champ, with cameos by real boxing greats Joe Louis, Henry Armstrong, Ceferino Garcia, and Manuel Ortiz. Heavyweight Jack Roper appeared as the character Waldo. The simple plot involved young boxer Joe and his girl resisting mob influence while Joe trains to fight the champ.

== Death ==
McLarnin died on 28 October 2004 at the age of 96 in Richland, Washington. He was interred in the Forest Lawn Memorial Park Cemetery in Glendale, California.

== Professional boxing record ==
| 69 fights | 55 wins | 11 losses |
|---|---|---|
| By knockout | 21 | 1 |
| By decision | 34 | 10 |
| Draws | 3 | |

| No. | Result | Record | Opponent | Type | Round | Date | Age | Location | Notes |
|---|---|---|---|---|---|---|---|---|---|
| 69 | Win | 55–11–3 | Lou Ambers | UD | 10 | Nov 20, 1936 | 28 years, 337 days | Madison Square Garden, New York City, New York, U.S. | |
| 68 | Win | 54–11–3 | Tony Canzoneri | UD | 10 | Oct 5, 1936 | 28 years, 291 days | Madison Square Garden, New York City, New York, U.S. | |
| 67 | Loss | 53–11–3 | Tony Canzoneri | UD | 10 | May 8, 1936 | 28 years, 141 days | Madison Square Garden, New York City, New York, U.S. | |
| 66 | Loss | 53–10–3 | Barney Ross | UD | 15 | May 28, 1935 | 27 years, 160 days | Polo Grounds, New York City, New York, U.S. | Lost NYSAC, NBA, and The Ring welterweight title |
| 65 | Win | 53–9–3 | Barney Ross | SD | 15 | Sep 17, 1934 | 26 years, 272 days | Madison Square Garden Bowl, Queens, New York, U.S. | Won NYSAC, NBA, and The Ring welterweight titles |
| 64 | Loss | 52–9–3 | Barney Ross | SD | 15 | May 28, 1934 | 26 years, 160 days | Madison Square Garden Bowl, Queens, New York, U.S. | Lost NYSAC, NBA, and The Ring welterweight titles |
| 63 | Win | 52–8–3 | Young Corbett III | TKO | 1 (10) | May 29, 1933 | 25 years, 161 days | Wrigley Field, Los Angeles, California, U.S. | Won NYSAC, NBA, and The Ring welterweight titles |
| 62 | Win | 51–8–3 | Sammy Fuller | TKO | 8 (10) | Dec 16, 1932 | 24 years, 363 days | Madison Square Garden, New York City, New York, U.S. | |
| 61 | Win | 50–8–3 | Benny Leonard | TKO | 6 (10) | Oct 7, 1932 | 24 years, 293 days | Madison Square Garden, New York City, New York, U.S. | |
| 60 | Loss | 49–8–3 | Lou Brouillard | SD | 10 | Aug 4, 1932 | 24 years, 229 days | Yankee Stadium, Bronx, New York, U.S. | |
| 59 | Win | 49–7–3 | Billy Petrolle | UD | 10 | Aug 20, 1931 | 23 years, 244 days | Yankee Stadium, Bronx, New York, U.S. | |
| 58 | Win | 48–7–3 | Billy Petrolle | UD | 10 | May 27, 1931 | 23 years, 159 days | Madison Square Garden, New York City, New York, U.S. | |
| 57 | Loss | 47–7–3 | Billy Petrolle | UD | 10 | Nov 21, 1930 | 22 years, 337 days | Madison Square Garden, New York City, New York, U.S. | |
| 56 | Win | 47–6–3 | Al Singer | KO | 3 (10) | Sep 11, 1930 | 22 years, 266 days | Yankee Stadium, Bronx, New York, U.S. | |
| 55 | Win | 46–6–3 | Jack Thompson | UD | 10 | Mar 28, 1930 | 22 years, 99 days | Madison Square Garden, New York City, New York, U.S. | |
| 54 | Win | 45–6–3 | Sammy Mandell | UD | 10 | Mar 1, 1930 | 22 years, 72 days | Chicago Stadium, Chicago, Illinois, U.S. | |
| 53 | Win | 44–6–3 | Ruby Goldstein | KO | 2 (10) | Dec 13, 1929 | 21 years, 359 days | Madison Square Garden, New York City, New York, U.S. | |
| 52 | Win | 43–6–3 | Sammy Mandell | UD | 10 | Nov 4, 1929 | 21 years, 320 days | Chicago Stadium, Chicago, Illinois, U.S. | |
| 51 | Win | 42–6–3 | Sergeant Sammy Baker | KO | 1 (10) | Oct 9, 1929 | 21 years, 294 days | New York Coliseum, Bronx, New York, U.S. | |
| 50 | Win | 41–6–3 | Ray Miller | UD | 10 | Mar 22, 1929 | 21 years, 93 days | Madison Square Garden, New York City, New York, U.S. | |
| 49 | Win | 40–6–3 | Joe Glick | KO | 2 (10) | Mar 1, 1929 | 21 years, 72 days | Madison Square Garden, New York City, New York, U.S. | |
| 48 | Win | 39–6–3 | Joe Glick | UD | 10 | Jan 11, 1929 | 21 years, 23 days | Madison Square Garden, New York City, New York, U.S. | |
| 47 | Loss | 38–6–3 | Ray Miller | RTD | 7 (10) | Nov 30, 1928 | 20 years, 347 days | Olympia Stadium, Detroit, Michigan, U.S. | |
| 46 | Win | 38–5–3 | Stanislaus Loayza | KO | 4 (10) | Aug 2, 1928 | 20 years, 227 days | Olympia Stadium, Detroit, Michigan, U.S. | |
| 45 | Win | 37–5–3 | Phil McGraw | TKO | 1 (10) | Jun 21, 1928 | 20 years, 185 days | Madison Square Garden, New York City, New York, U.S. | |
| 44 | Loss | 36–5–3 | Sammy Mandell | UD | 15 | May 21, 1928 | 20 years, 154 days | Polo Grounds, New York City, New York, U.S. | For NYSAC, NBA, and The Ring lightweight titles |
| 43 | Win | 36–4–3 | Sid Terris | KO | 1 (10) | Feb 24, 1928 | 20 years, 67 days | Madison Square Garden, New York City, New York, U.S. | |
| 42 | Win | 35–4–3 | Billy Wallace | PTS | 10 | Nov 23, 1927 | 19 years, 339 days | Olympia Stadium, Detroit, Michigan, U.S. | |
| 41 | Win | 34–4–3 | Louis Kaplan | KO | 8 (10) | Oct 18, 1927 | 19 years, 303 days | Chicago Stadium, Chicago, Illinois, U.S. | |
| 40 | Win | 33–4–3 | Don Long | KO | 3 (10) | Sep 23, 1927 | 19 years, 278 days | San Diego Coliseum, San Diego, California, U.S. | |
| 39 | Win | 32–4–3 | Charlie McBride | KO | 2 (10) | Sep 9, 1927 | 19 years, 264 days | San Diego Coliseum, San Diego, California, U.S. | |
| 38 | Win | 31–4–3 | Lope Tenorio | PTS | 10 | Jun 24, 1927 | 19 years, 187 days | Legion Stadium, Hollywood, California, U.S. | |
| 37 | Win | 30–4–3 | Johnny Lamar | PTS | 10 | May 27, 1927 | 19 years, 159 days | Legion Stadium, Hollywood, California, U.S. | |
| 36 | Win | 29–4–3 | Freeman Black | KO | 2 (10) | May 6, 1927 | 19 years, 138 days | San Diego Coliseum, San Diego, California, U.S. | |
| 35 | Win | 28–4–3 | Tommy Cello | PTS | 10 | Apr 5, 1927 | 19 years, 107 days | Olympic Auditorium, Los Angeles, California, U.S. | |
| 34 | Draw | 27–4–3 | Tommy Cello | PTS | 10 | Feb 22, 1927 | 19 years, 65 days | Recreation Park, San Francisco, California, U.S. | |
| 33 | Loss | 27–4–2 | Doc Snell | PTS | 10 | Oct 15, 1926 | 18 years, 300 days | Legion Stadium, Hollywood, California, U.S. | |
| 32 | Win | 27–3–2 | Joe Glick | PTS | 10 | Sep 7, 1926 | 18 years, 262 days | Vernon Arena, Vernon, California, U.S. | |
| 31 | Loss | 26–3–2 | Johnny Farr | PTS | 10 | Mar 17, 1926 | 18 years, 88 days | Olympic Auditorium, Los Angeles, California, U.S. | |
| 30 | Win | 26–2–2 | Joey Sangor | KO | 3 (10) | Mar 3, 1926 | 18 years, 74 days | Olympic Auditorium, Los Angeles, California, U.S. | |
| 29 | Loss | 25–2–2 | Bud Taylor | PTS | 10 | Jan 12, 1926 | 18 years, 24 days | Vernon Arena, Vernon, California, U.S. | |
| 28 | Win | 25–1–2 | Bud Taylor | DQ | 2 (10) | Dec 8, 1925 | 17 years, 354 days | Vernon Arena, Vernon, California, U.S. | |
| 27 | Win | 24–1–2 | Jackie Fields | KO | 2 (10) | Nov 12, 1925 | 17 years, 328 days | Olympic Auditorium, Los Angeles, California, U.S. | |
| 26 | Win | 23–1–2 | Pancho Villa | PTS | 10 | Jul 4, 1925 | 17 years, 197 days | Oaks Park, Emeryville, California, U.S. | |
| 25 | Loss | 22–1–2 | Bud Taylor | PTS | 10 | Jun 2, 1925 | 17 years, 165 days | Vernon Arena, Vernon, California, U.S. | |
| 24 | Win | 22–0–2 | Eddie Spec Ramies | KO | 6 (6) | Apr 18, 1925 | 17 years, 120 days | Recreation Park, San Francisco, California, U.S. | |
| 23 | Win | 21–0–2 | Young Farrell | PTS | 6 | Apr 11, 1925 | 17 years, 113 days | Lyceum A.C., Los Angeles, California, U.S. | |
| 22 | Win | 20–0–2 | Teddy Silva | PTS | 10 | Mar 24, 1925 | 17 years, 95 days | Vernon Arena, Vernon, California, U.S. | |
| 21 | Win | 19–0–2 | Fidel LaBarba | PTS | 10 | Jan 13, 1925 | 17 years, 25 days | Vernon Arena, Vernon, California, U.S. | Won Pacific Coast flyweight title |
| 20 | Draw | 18–0–2 | Memphis Pal Moore | PTS | 4 | Dec 9, 1924 | 16 years, 356 days | Vernon Arena, Vernon, California, U.S. | |
| 19 | Draw | 18–0–1 | Fidel LaBarba | PTS | 4 | Nov 11, 1924 | 16 years, 328 days | Vernon Arena, Vernon, California, U.S. | |
| 18 | Win | 18–0 | Fidel LaBarba | PTS | 4 | Oct 28, 1924 | 16 years, 314 days | Vernon Arena, Vernon, California, U.S. | |
| 17 | Win | 17–0 | Young Nationalista | PTS | 4 | Oct 14, 1924 | 16 years, 300 days | Vernon Arena, Vernon, California, U.S. | |
| 16 | Win | 16–0 | Frankie Dolan | PTS | 4 | Oct 7, 1924 | 16 years, 293 days | Vernon Arena, Vernon, California, U.S. | |
| 15 | Win | 15–0 | Benny Diaz | PTS | 4 | Sep 30, 1924 | 16 years, 286 days | Vernon Arena, Vernon, California, U.S. | |
| 14 | Win | 14–0 | Mickey Gill | MD | 10 | Aug 15, 1924 | 16 years, 240 days | Arena, Vancouver, British Columbia, Canada | |
| 13 | Win | 13–0 | Abe Gordon | KO | 2 (4) | May 14, 1924 | 16 years, 147 days | Oakland Auditorium Arena, Oakland, California, U.S. | |
| 12 | Win | 12–0 | Jimmy Griffiths | PTS | 4 | May 2, 1924 | 16 years, 135 days | L-st Arena, Sacramento, California, U.S. | |
| 11 | Win | 11–0 | Jockey Joe Dillon | PTS | 4 | Apr 30, 1924 | 16 years, 133 days | Oakland Auditorium Arena, Oakland, California, U.S. | |
| 10 | Win | 10–0 | Johnny Jockey Lightner | PTS | 4 | Apr 24, 1924 | 16 years, 127 days | Oakland Auditorium Arena, Oakland, California, U.S. | |
| 9 | Win | 9–0 | Frankie Grandetta | PTS | 4 | Apr 9, 1924 | 16 years, 112 days | Oakland Auditorium Arena, Oakland, California, U.S. | |
| 8 | Win | 8–0 | Jimmy Griffiths | PTS | 4 | Apr 4, 1924 | 16 years, 107 days | Oakland Auditorium Arena, Oakland, California, U.S. | |
| 7 | Win | 7–0 | Sammy Lee | PTS | 4 | Mar 26, 1924 | 16 years, 98 days | Oakland Auditorium Arena, Oakland, California, U.S. | |
| 6 | Win | 6–0 | Frankie Sands | PTS | 4 | Mar 19, 1924 | 16 years, 91 days | Oakland Auditorium Arena, Oakland, California, U.S. | |
| 5 | Win | 5–0 | Joe Conde | TKO | 3 (4) | Mar 5, 1924 | 16 years, 77 days | Oakland Auditorium Arena, Oakland, California, U.S. | |
| 4 | Win | 4–0 | Eddie Collins | TKO | 3 (4) | Feb 22, 1924 | 16 years, 65 days | Oakland Auditorium Arena, Oakland, California, U.S. | |
| 3 | Win | 3–0 | Frankie Sands | PTS | 4 | Feb 13, 1924 | 16 years, 56 days | Oakland Auditorium Arena, Oakland, California, U.S. | |
| 2 | Win | 2–0 | Mickey Gill | MD | 7 | Dec 28, 1923 | 16 years, 9 days | Hastings Gym, Vancouver, British Columbia | |
| 1 | Win | 1–0 | Young Fry | KO | 1 (6) | Dec 19, 1923 | 16 years, 0 days | Hasting Gym, Vancouver, British Columbia | |

== Titles in boxing ==
=== Major world titles ===
- NYSAC welterweight champion (147 lbs) (2×)
- NBA (WBA) welterweight champion (147 lbs) (2×)

=== The Ring magazine titles ===
- The Ring welterweight champion (147 lbs) (2×)

=== Regional/International titles ===
- Pacific Coast flyweight champion (112 lbs)

=== Undisputed titles ===
- Undisputed welterweight champion (2×)

== See also ==
- List of welterweight boxing champions

== Notes ==
Awards and achievements
| Preceded by Young Corbett III | World Welterweight Champion; 29 May 1933 – 28 May 1934 | Succeeded by Barney Ross |
| Preceded by Young Corbett III | The Ring Welterweight Champion; 29 May 1933 – 28 May 1934 | Succeeded by Barney Ross |
| Preceded by Barney Ross | World Welterweight Champion; 17 September 1934 – 28 May 1935 | Succeeded by Barney Ross |
| Preceded by Barney Ross | The Ring Welterweight Champion; 17 September 1934 – 28 May 1935 | Succeeded by Barney Ross |
