= Sammy Fuller =

American boxer (1906–1979)

Personal information
- Nickname: Boston's Pride of Little Italy
- Born: Sabino Ferullo; June 10, 1906 Boston, Massachusetts, U.S.
- Died: May 30, 1979 (aged 72) Revere, Massachusetts, U.S.
- Height: 5 ft 3 1/2 in (161 cm)
- Weight: Featherweight; Super featherweight Lightweight; Light welterweight

Boxing career
- Reach: 62 in (157 cm)

Boxing record
- Total fights: 76
- Wins: 55
- Win by KO: 22
- Losses: 18
- Draws: 3

Sammy Fuller (June 10, 1906 – May 30, 1979), born Sabino Ferullo, was an American professional boxer who competed from 1924 to 1943. He held the New England featherweight and lightweight titles between 1928 and 1930 and had a claim to the world light welterweight title from 1932 to 1933. As of 2026, BoxRec ranked Fuller as the 29th-greatest lightweight boxer of all time.

== Personal life ==
Fuller was born and resided in Boston, Massachusetts. Both of his parents were Italian. Fuller was married to Jenny Raffaele, with whom he had four children: two sons, Sabino Jr. and Michael, and two daughters, Joan and Geraldine.

== Boxing career ==
Fuller began his professional career in 1924. By 1926, he was ranked the world's No. 11 featherweight by The Ring magazine in its annual ratings, published in the February 1927 issue, and rose to a career-high No. 7 in the division in May 1928. After moving up to super featherweight, Fuller became the magazine's No. 1 contender in April 1930. He later achieved the same distinction at lightweight, earning the No. 1 ranking in March 1931. In May 1932, Fuller claimed The Ring's light welterweight title.

Fuller won his first professional championship on March 26, 1928, defeating Chick Suggs for the New England featherweight title in the third of their four meetings. Fuller had lost their first encounter before winning each of their final three bouts.

On May 26, 1930, Fuller challenged Andy Callahan for the New England lightweight title in the first of their seven meetings. After a closely contested ten rounds, Callahan staged a wild closing rally to earn a narrow decision victory. Fuller avenged the defeat in their rematch on August 25, outpointing Callahan over ten rounds to capture the title. They met for a third time on November 17, with Callahan defeating Fuller to regain the title.

On March 6, 1931, Fuller faced reigning undisputed world lightweight champion and future three-division world champion Tony Canzoneri in a non-title bout, defeating him by unanimous decision over ten rounds.

Fuller challenged Callahan for the New England lightweight title again in their fourth meeting on November 16, 1931, losing by split decision. The pair went on to meet three more times, with Fuller winning two of their final three bouts.

On April 1, 1932, Fuller fought world light welterweight champion Jack Kid Berg to a draw in a non-title bout. The two met again seven weeks later, with Fuller winning by split decision to claim Berg's Ring magazine light welterweight title.

On November 17, 1933, Fuller challenged future three-division world champion Barney Ross for the world light welterweight title, losing by majority decision over ten rounds.

Fuller also faced several other notable world champions during his career, including Jimmy McLarnin, Lou Ambers, Benny Bass, and Johnny Jadick, defeating Jadick by fourth-round TKO. Fuller retired from professional boxing in 1943 with a record of 55–18–3, including 22 victories by knockout.

== Professional boxing record ==
76 fights	55 wins	18 losses
By knockout	22	2
By decision	33	16
Draws	3	

No.	Result	Record	Opponent	Type	Round, time	Date	Location	Notes
76	Loss	55–18–3	Ralph Zannelli	TKO	5 (10)	Apr 16, 1943	Boston Garden, Boston, Massachusetts, U.S.	
75	Win	55–17–3	Bill Speary	KO	1 (10)	Apr 2, 1943	Arena, Boston, Massachusetts, U.S.	
74	Win	54–17–3	Joe De Jesus	UD	10	Feb 4, 1943	Mechanics Building, Boston, Massachusetts, U.S.	
73	Win	53–17–3	Bobby Pacho	MD	10	Dec 17, 1937	Boston Garden, Boston, Massachusetts, U.S.	
72	Win	52–17–3	Andy Callahan	SD	10	May 24, 1937	Fenway Park, Boston, Massachusetts, U.S.	
71	Loss	51–17–3	Andy Callahan	SD	10	Mar 22, 1937	Mechanics Building, Boston, Massachusetts, U.S.	
70	Win	51–16–3	Andy Callahan	KO	1 (10)	Feb 12, 1937	Mechanics Building, Boston, Massachusetts, U.S.	
69	Loss	50–16–3	Lou Ambers	UD	15	Mar 1, 1935	Madison Square Garden, New York City, New York, U.S.	
68	Win	50–15–3	Bobby Pacho	PTS	10	Dec 21, 1934	Boston Garden, Boston, Massachusetts, U.S.	
67	Win	49–15–3	Eddie Cool	PTS	10	Dec 14, 1934	Madison Square Garden, New York City, New York, U.S.	
66	Win	48–15–3	Johnny Jadick	TKO	4 (10)	Nov 30, 1934	Madison Square Garden, New York City, New York, U.S.	
65	Loss	47–15–3	Young Peter Jackson	PTS	10	Nov 16, 1934	Madison Square Garden, New York City, New York, U.S.	
64	Win	47–14–3	Dick Edwards	KO	2 (10)	Aug 14, 1934	Old Orchard Beach, Maine, U.S.	
63	Win	46–14–3	Harry Carlton	PTS	10	Apr 2, 1934	Arena, Philadelphia, Pennsylvania, U.S.	
62	Loss	45–14–3	Barney Ross	MD	10	Nov 17, 1933	Chicago Stadium, Chicago, Illinois, U.S.	For world light welterweight title
61	Loss	45–13–3	Billy Petrolle	UD	10	Oct 21, 1933	Ridgewood Grove, Brooklyn, New York City, New York, U.S.	
60	Draw	45–12–3	Billy Petrolle	PTS	10	Sep 8, 1933	Boston Garden, Boston, Massachusetts, U.S.	
59	Loss	45–12–2	KO Castillo	NWS	10	Jul 10, 1933	Portland, Maine, U.S.	
58	Loss	45–11–2	Jimmy McLarnin	KO	8 (10)	Dec 16, 1932	Madison Square Garden, New York City, New York, U.S.	
57	Win	45–10–2	Billy Wallace	PTS	10	Dec 6, 1932	Public Hall, Cleveland, Ohio, U.S.	
56	Win	44–10–2	Jack Kid Berg	SD	12	May 20, 1932	Madison Square Garden, New York City, New York, U.S.	Claimed world light welterweight title
55	Draw	43–10–2	Jack Kid Berg	PTS	10	Apr 1, 1932	Madison Square Garden, New York City, New York, U.S.	
54	Win	43–10–1	Billy Wallace	KO	7 (10)	Mar 18, 1932	Madison Square Garden, New York City, New York, U.S.	
53	Win	42–10–1	Eddie Holmes	UD	10	Mar 2, 1932	Casino, Fall River, Massachusetts, U.S.	
52	Win	41–10–1	Ray Miller	PTS	10	Feb 26, 1932	Madison Square Garden, New York City, New York, U.S.	
51	Win	40–10–1	Ted Kid Drew	KO	9 (12)	Feb 16, 1932	Exposition Building, Portland, Maine, U.S.	
50	Loss	39–10–1	Andy Callahan	SD	12	Nov 16, 1931	Arena, Boston, Massachusetts, U.S.	For USA New England lightweight title
49	Draw	39–9–1	Ernie Mandell	PTS	10	Nov 9, 1931	Rhode Island Auditorium, Providence, Rhode Island, U.S.	
48	Win	39–9	Mickey Blair	KO	2 (10)	Oct 26, 1931	Convention Hall, Rochester, New York, U.S.	
47	Win	38–9	Babe Herman	KO	1 (10)	Jul 20, 1931	Mark's Stadium, Tiverton, Rhode Island, U.S.	
46	Loss	37–9	Pancho Villa	PTS	10	Jul 13, 1931	Battery Park, New Bedford, Massachusetts, U.S.	
45	Win	37–8	Steve Halaiko	PTS	10	Jun 29, 1931	Braves Field, Boston, Massachusetts, U.S.	
44	Win	36–8	Tony Canzoneri	UD	10	Mar 6, 1931	Boston Garden, Boston, Massachusetts, U.S.	
43	Win	35–8	Bruce Flowers	TKO	6 (6)	Feb 9, 1931	Arena, Boston, Massachusetts, U.S.	
42	Win	34–8	Young Montreal	PTS	10	Jan 23, 1931	Rhode Island Auditorium, Providence, Rhode Island, U.S.	
41	Loss	33–8	Andy Callahan	PTS	10	Nov 17, 1930	Arena, Boston, Massachusetts, U.S.	Lost USA New England lightweight title
40	Win	33–7	Andy Callahan	PTS	10	Aug 25, 1930	Mark's Stadium, Tiverton, Rhode Island, U.S.	Won USA New England lightweight title
39	Win	32–7	Augie Pisano	KO	1 (10)	Jul 28, 1930	Mark's Stadium, Tiverton, Rhode Island, U.S.	
38	Win	31–7	Billy Lynch	PTS	10	Jul 15, 1930	Mark's Stadium, Tiverton, Rhode Island, U.S.	
37	Loss	30–7	Andy Callahan	PTS	10	May 26, 1930	Mechanics Building, Boston, Massachusetts, U.S.	For vacant USA New England lightweight title
36	Win	30–6	Benny Bass	DQ	5 (10)	Feb 7, 1930	Boston Garden, Boston, Massachusetts, U.S.	
35	Win	29–6	Johnny Farr	PTS	10	Nov 29, 1929	Madison Square Garden, New York City, New York, U.S.	
34	Win	28–6	Jake Zeramby	PTS	10	Oct 25, 1929	Boston Garden, Boston, Massachusetts, U.S.	
33	Win	27–6	Midget Kilburn	TKO	1 (10)	Oct 7, 1929	Valley Arena, Holyoke, Massachusetts, U.S.	
32	Loss	26–6	Jake Zeramby	DQ	3 (10)	Jun 20, 1929	Fenway Park, Boston, Massachusetts, U.S.	
31	Win	26–5	Chick Suggs	TKO	8 (10)	May 30, 1929	Mark's Stadium, Tiverton, Rhode Island, U.S.	
30	Win	25–5	Johnny Harko	TKO	2 (10)	Jan 7, 1929	Fall River, Massachusetts, U.S.	
29	Loss	24–5	Dick Finnegan	PTS	10	Jul 2, 1928	Braves Field, Boston, Massachusetts, U.S.	
28	Win	24–4	Chick Suggs	PTS	10	Mar 26, 1928	Arena, Boston, Massachusetts, U.S.	Won USA New England featherweight title
27	Win	23–4	Johnny Sheppard	PTS	10	Aug 29, 1927	Arena, Boston, Massachusetts, U.S.	
26	Win	22–4	Chick Suggs	PTS	10	Apr 22, 1927	Arena, Boston, Massachusetts, U.S.	
25	Win	21–4	Red Chapman	PTS	10	Feb 28, 1927	Arena, Boston, Massachusetts, U.S.	
24	Win	20–4	Tony Thomas	KO	1 (10)	Jan 17, 1927	Casino, Fall River, Massachusetts, U.S.	
23	Win	19–4	Johnny Sheppard	UD	10	Oct 18, 1926	Arena, Boston, Massachusetts, U.S.	
22	Win	18–4	Johnny Brown	TKO	1 (10)	Sep 16, 1926	Braves Field, Boston, Massachusetts, U.S.	Brown is reported as the featherweight champion of New England
21	Win	17–4	Carl Tremaine	PTS	10	Jun 28, 1926	Braves Field, Boston, Massachusetts, U.S.	
20	Loss	16–4	Chick Suggs	PTS	10	May 18, 1926	Mechanics Building, Boston, Massachusetts, U.S.	For USA New England featherweight title
19	Win	16–3	Mickey Blaine	TKO	3 (8)	Apr 1, 1926	Mechanics Building, Boston, Massachusetts, U.S.	
18	Win	15–3	Tony Thomas	KO	6 (10)	Jan 19, 1926	Mechanics Building, Boston, Massachusetts, U.S.	
17	Win	14–3	Matty Cordes	PTS	8	Dec 18, 1925	Mechanics Building, Boston, Massachusetts, U.S.	
16	Win	13–3	Mike Castle	PTS	10	Oct 23, 1925	Winter Garden, Lawrence, Massachusetts, U.S.	
15	Loss	12–3	Mike Castle	PTS	10	Oct 5, 1925	Winter Garden, Lawrence, Massachusetts, U.S.	
14	Win	12–2	Tony Carney	TKO	6 (10)	Sep 11, 1925	Mechanics Building, Boston, Massachusetts, U.S.	
13	Win	11–2	Matty Cordes	PTS	8	Aug 28, 1925	Braves Field, Boston, Massachusetts, U.S.	
12	Win	10–2	Johnny Vacca	PTS	10	May 18, 1925	Mechanics Building, Boston, Massachusetts, U.S.	
11	Win	9–2	Tony Carney	PTS	10	Apr 11, 1925	Mechanics Building, Boston, Massachusetts, U.S.	
10	Win	8–2	Pat Kneeland	KO	4 (10)	Mar 30, 1925	Infantry Hall, Providence, Rhode Island, U.S.	
9	Win	7–2	Joe Clifford	PTS	10	Mar 12, 1925	Providence, Rhode Island, U.S.	
8	Win	6–2	Clovis Durand	KO	1 (10)	Mar 6, 1925	Providence, Rhode Island, U.S.	
7	Loss	5–2	Tony Carney	PTS	10	Feb 3, 1925	Mechanics Building, Boston, Massachusetts, U.S.	
6	Loss	5–1	Johnny Vacca	PTS	8	Jan 20, 1925	Mechanics Building, Boston, Massachusetts, U.S.	
5	Win	5–0	Charlie Baxter	PTS	8	Nov 5, 1924	Mechanics Building, Boston, Massachusetts, U.S.	
4	Win	4–0	Willie Woods	PTS	8	Oct 3, 1924	Mechanics Building, Boston, Massachusetts, U.S.	
3	Win	3–0	Benny Nelson	TKO	4 (?)	Aug 15, 1924	Braves Field, Boston, Massachusetts, U.S.	
2	Win	2–0	Frankie Hebert	PTS	8	Jun 13, 1924	Mechanics Building, Boston, Massachusetts, U.S.	
1	Win	1–0	Jimmy Manning	TKO	4 (4)	May 17, 1924		

== See also ==
- List of male boxers
