= Justo Suárez =

Argentine boxer

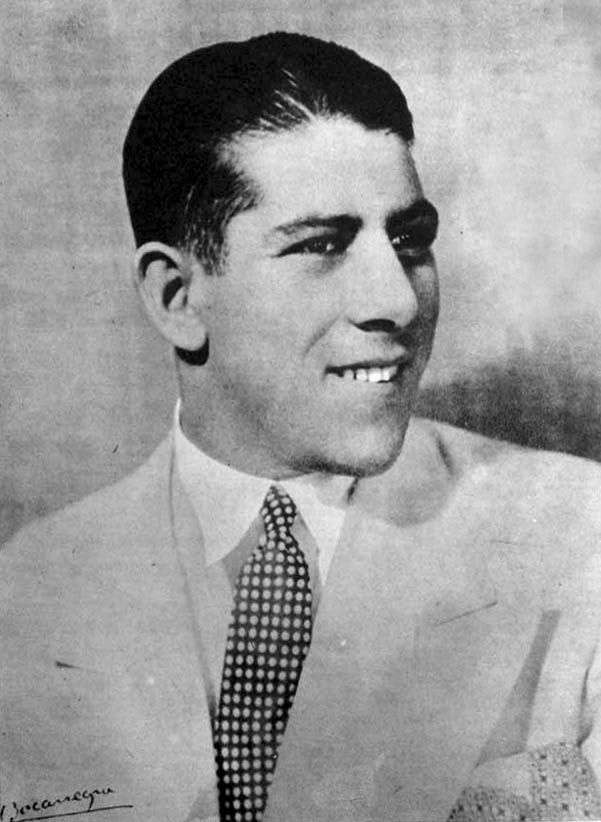
- Portrait of Suárez in 1930

Personal information
- Nickname: "El Torito de Mataderos"
- Nationality: (Argentina) Argentine
- Born: Justo Antonio Suárez; January 5, 1909 Buenos Aires, Argentina
- Died: August 10, 1938 (aged 29) Cosquín, Córdoba, Argentina
- Weight: Light weight

Boxing career

Boxing record
- Wins: 24
- Losses: 2
- Draws: 1
- No contests: 1

Justo Suárez (January 5, 1909 – August 10, 1938), nicknamed "El Torito de Mataderos" ("The Little Bull of Mataderos)", was a popular Argentine light weight boxer. His huge popularity was widely greater than his professional achievements as a fighter.

Suárez is regarded as the first idol (and one of the greatest) in the history of Argentine boxing.

== Biography ==
Justo Suárez was the 15th (of 25 in total) son of a family and grew up in the misery. He had to work as a child to help his family. From the age of 9 Suárez worked in different jobs, one of them in a slaughterhouse (very common in the Mataderos neighborhood). At the same time he started to practise boxing in his house located in Guaminí street in Mataderos.

At 19, Suárez was already a professional boxer which allowed him to earn money for the first time, fighting in festivals in any part of Buenos Aires. During one of those meetings, Suárez was nicknamed the "Torito of Mataderos", which would retain in the collective Argentine memory. He did not have a skilled technique but his fierceness and attitude helped him win many fights, and therefore more people came to see him box.

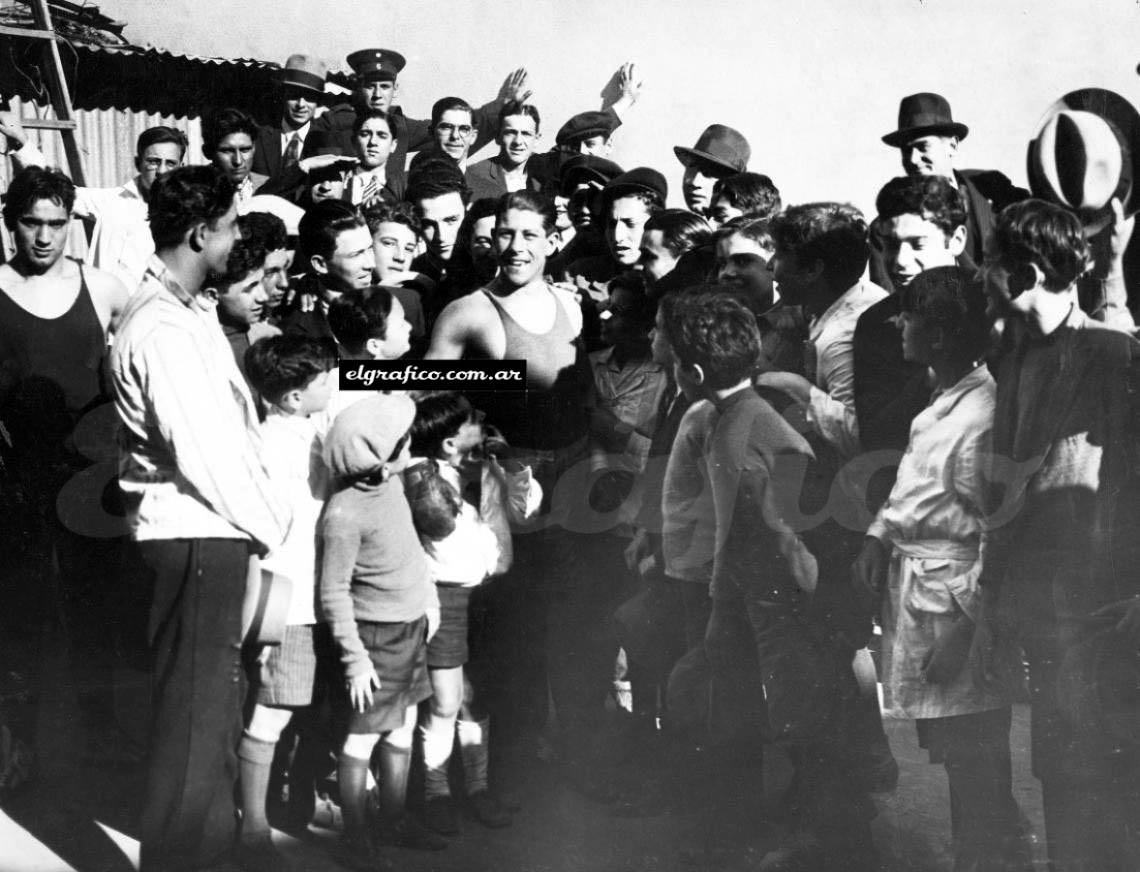
Suárez soon became an idol among the Argentine people

When José Lectoure, a famous fight organizer, met Suárez, he said to him "You fight in the 'criollo' style, so you have to learn the technique of boxing", and began to teach him, adopting him as his ward.

Two years later Suárez was fighting for the Argentine championship and a huge crowd followed him. He fought against Julio Mocoroa in the old River Plate stadium, winning the contest on points average. By then, Suárez' popularity had increased notably. For the first time, the denigrated lower class saw how one of them could escape from poverty to live a comfortable life at the highest level.

Due to his popularity in Argentina, Suárez sailed to the United States to fight there. He fought 5 times in only 4 months, winning all of the fights and gaining a reputation in the USA. He returned to Argentina with much celebrity. He fought against the Chilean Estanislao Loayza at a sold-out Luna Park stadium, winning by points average in what was considered one of his best fights. Amongst the attendance was the President of Argentina, José Félix Uriburu and the Princes of England, Edward of Windsor, later King Edward VIII, and Prince George of Kent, who cheered Suárez from the front seats when the referee raised Suarez's hand proclaiming him the winner.

That wonderful gift of being fierce in the ring and gentle in the rest of the world

— Journalist Félix Frascara remembering Suárez in 1942

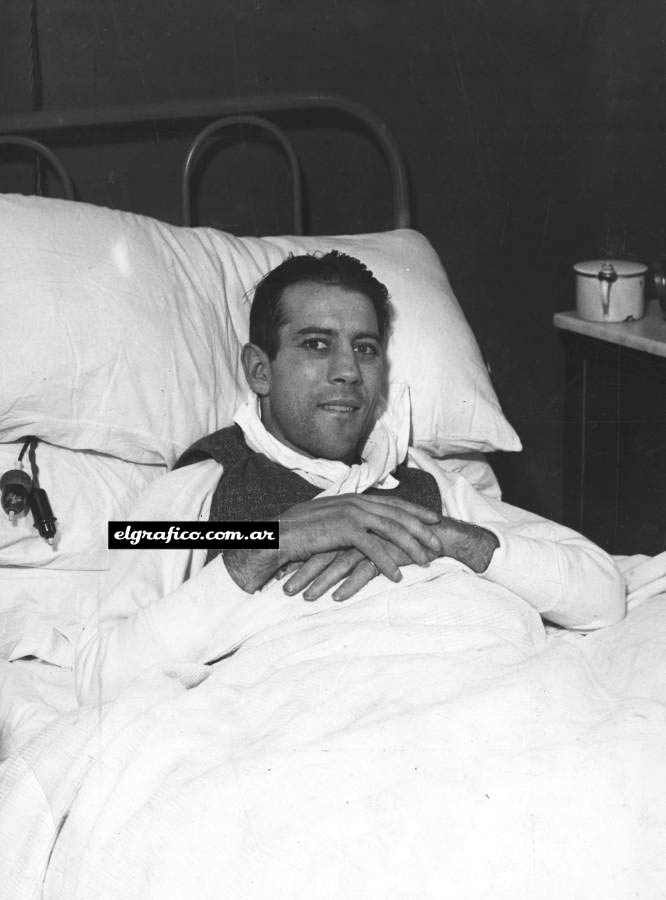
Suárez after catching tuberculosis, which would cause his death in 1938

Suárez returned to New York City to fight for the World Championship, having to fight several rivals on the road to the title. His fight was against a tough boxer, Billy Petrolle, who was not well known, but who defeated Suárez in 9 rounds. This was the first loss in Suárez's professional career. With this defeat, Suárez lost the chance to fight for the world championship.

Sometime before, Suárez had caught tuberculosis and the illness progressed in him. In 1932, he lost his second match, this time at the hands of Víctor Peralta. This broke up his deal with his mentor Lectoure. Now weakened by the sickness, Suárez went to Córdoba with the little money he had. Three years later, he died in misery, far from his glory days.

His body was brought from Cosquín to Buenos Aires, and buried in La Chacarita Cemetery, The funeral was accompanied by a large crowd who took the coffin to Luna Park, the place where Suárez had won his most glorious fights.

== In popular culture ==
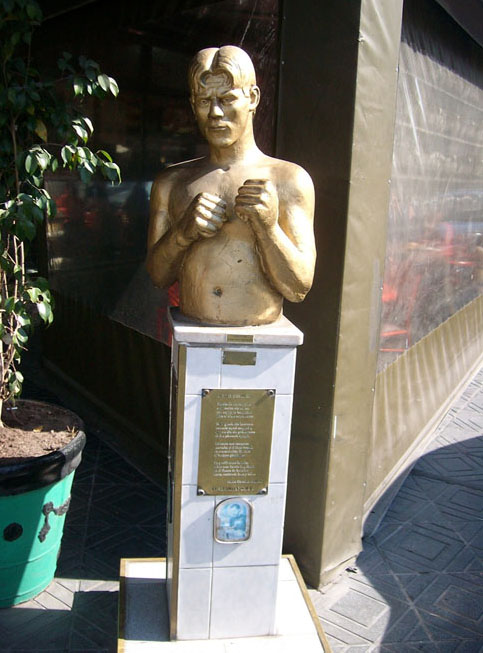
Bust of Suárez in Mataderos

- On July 16, 1930, the popular Tango singer Charlo recorded Muñeco al Suelo, a song dedicated to Suárez.
- One of Julio Cortázar's most famous tales, Torito (from the book Final del Juego, 1956) is about Suárez, whom Cortázar admired.
- Argentine reggae band Los Pericos tributed Suárez with the song Torito, from the album Pampas Reggae (1994)
- In 2002, a movie inspired on Suárez and called I love you... Torito was released in Argentina.
- The street where the Nueva Chicago stadium is located on, was named "Justo Suárez" as a tribute to the boxer. So there is a bust of Suárez on the corner of Alberdi and Murguiondo streets, in the Mataderos neighborhood.

== See also ==
- Oscar Bonavena
- José María Gatica
