= Fighting Blood =

Fighting Blood may refer to:

- Fighting Blood (1911 film), an American short silent Western film
- Fighting Blood (1951 film), a short Australian documentary
