= Kelso =

Kelso may refer to:

== Places ==
=== Australia ===
- Kelso, New South Wales
- Kelso, Tasmania
- Kelso, Queensland

=== Canada ===
- Kelso Conservation Area, Ontario, containing Lake Kelso
  - Kelso, a village in Regional Municipality of Halton, Ontario

=== New Zealand ===
- Kelso, New Zealand

=== South Africa ===
- Kelso, KwaZulu-Natal, a small coastal village south of Durban

=== United Kingdom ===
- Kelso, Scottish Borders, Scotland
  - Kelso railway station

=== United States ===
- Kelso, Arkansas
- Kelso, California
  - Kelso Dunes
  - Kelso Mountains
- Claraville, California formerly Kelso
- Kelso Township, Dearborn County, Indiana
- Kelso Township, Sibley County, Minnesota
- Kelso, Missouri
- Kelso Township, Scott County, Missouri
- Kelso Site in Hooker County, Nebraska, the site of a prehistoric village
- Kelso, Oregon
- Kelso, Tennessee
- Kelso, Texas
- Kelso, Washington

== Sports ==
- Kelso Racecourse, a horse racing venue in Kelso, Scotland
- Kelso (horse), an American thoroughbred racehorse
- Kelso RFC, a rugby club in Kelso, Scotland
- Kelso Stakes, an American horse race in Elmont, New York
- Kelso United F.C., a football club in Kelso, Scotland
- Premier Kelso Hurdle, a national hunt hurdle race in Scotland

== Other uses ==
- Kelso (name), a surname and a given name, including a list of people with the name
- MV Kelso, a fishing vessel, later named MY Titanic
- Kelso & Company, an American private equity firm
- Kelso River, a stream in Minnesota, U.S.
- Michael Kelso, a fictional character in That '70s Show
- Bob Kelso, a fictional character from Scrubs

== See also ==
- Kelsey (disambiguation)
- Kelso High School (disambiguation)
