= Tommy Grogan =

American boxer (1904–1972)

Personal information
- Born: Clarence Thomas Grogan; February 6, 1904 Cascade, Iowa, U.S.
- Died: April 3, 1972 (aged 68) Omaha, Nebraska, U.S.
- Height: 5 ft 6 1/2 in (169 cm)
- Weight: Featherweight; Super featherweight Lightweight; Light welterweight

Boxing career

Boxing record
- Total fights: 120
- Wins: 73
- Win by KO: 36
- Losses: 37
- Draws: 10

Tommy Grogan (born Clarence Thomas Grogan; February 6, 1904 – April 3, 1972) was an American professional boxer who competed from 1924 to 1950. Between April 1928 and May 1932, he was ranked among The Ring magazine's top ten contenders at super featherweight, lightweight, and light welterweight, reaching a career-high ranking of No. 2 in the world at light welterweight in January 1931.

== Boxing career ==
Fighting out of Omaha, Nebraska, Grogan began his professional career in 1924, compiling a 9–1–2 record over his first 12 bouts.

On October 3, 1925, Grogan faced Frank Larrabee in a rematch, having outpointed him over ten rounds in their first meeting. With the Nebraska State featherweight championship at stake, Larrabee reversed the result, outpointing Grogan to win the title. Two fights later, on January 29, 1926, Grogan faced Joey Clein for the Nebraska Athletic Commission featherweight title, losing by decision. On March 2, Grogan faced Jimmy Josephs, stopping him by technical knockout in the ninth round.

On March 26, 1927, Grogan knocked out Billy Kennedy in the third round of a scheduled six round bout. After being outpointed by Joey Medill over six rounds on May 31, 1927, Grogan was scheduled to face him in a rematch on June 24. However, Medill was unable to pass the pre-fight medical examination due to an infected tooth and was replaced by Don Davis, whom Grogan outpointed over six rounds.

On April 27, 1928, Grogan faced Billy Petrolle, winning by technical knockout after the seventh round when an eye injury prevented Petrolle from answering the bell for the eighth. On August 6, it was reported that Grogan had signed to challenge Tod Morgan for the world super featherweight championship, though the bout ultimately never took place.

Grogan was scheduled to face Carl Duane, whom he had defeated in their first meeting, at Queensboro Stadium in Long Island City, Queens, on September 18, 1928. After Duane withdrew due to a cold, Al Bryant stepped in as his replacement. Grogan floored Bryant three times for nine-counts in the third round and dominated the ensuing rounds, battering him around the ring from the fourth through the eighth. The punishment continued into the ninth until the referee stopped the bout one minute and 38 seconds into the round, giving Grogan a technical knockout victory. On October 5, 1928, Grogan faced Joe Glick at Madison Square Garden. Glick floored Grogan near the end of the sixth round and again with five seconds remaining in the seventh. Grogan was further weakened by Glick's sustained body attack in the eighth and ninth rounds before going on to lose a decisive decision.

In late December 1928, it was reported that either Grogan or Ray Miller was expected to next challenge Sammy Mandell for the world lightweight championship. The two contenders instead agreed to face each other, meeting at Olympia Stadium on January 11, 1929, in the first of two bouts between the pair in quick succession, with Mandell watching from ringside. Grogan floored Miller six times over the first three rounds, but was knocked out in the fourth after momentarily dropping his right hand and leaving himself open to a counter. The United Press described the bout as one of the most spectacular ever staged at Olympia Stadium. In a rematch three weeks later, Grogan adopted a more cautious approach, but lost a ten-round decision to Miller. Neither fighter was able to replicate the excitement of their thrilling first encounter, and the crowd booed the decision.

On June 18, 1929, Grogan faced future world light welterweight champion Johnny Jadick, earning a ten-round decision victory. On December 6, Grogan faced Glick in a rematch in San Francisco, flooring him in the ninth round en route to a decision victory.

Grogan faced Billy McMahon on January 20, 1930, outpointing him over ten rounds. On May 9, Grogan faced reigning world lightweight champion Sammy Mandell in a non-title bout, earning a draw by repeatedly forcing the action into close quarters, where his effective infighting and clean punches kept him on even terms with the champion. On June 24, Grogan faced former world featherweight champion and future three-division world champion Tony Canzoneri at Queensboro Stadium. Grogan floored Canzoneri for a nine-count in the second round and dealt out considerable punishment in the early rounds, but gradually surrendered his advantage as the aggressive Canzoneri took control of the bout. Canzoneri dropped Grogan briefly in the eighth, and although Grogan rallied strongly in the tenth and final round, he was unable to overcome Canzoneri's lead and lost by decision. On November 17, Grogan faced Jadick in a rematch, with Jadick avenging his earlier defeat by outpointing Grogan over ten rounds.

On March 23, 1931, Grogan faced reigning world lightweight champion Canzoneri in a non-title rematch in Philadelphia, Pennsylvania, losing by decision over ten rounds. Two fights later on April 24, Grogan knocked out Iowa Joe Rivers in the sixth round.

Grogan suffered consecutive defeats in May and June 1932, first losing by first-round knockout to Goldie Hess before dropping a unanimous decision to Billy Petrolle in their second meeting. Grogan rebounded on August 1, when he faced Hess in a rematch and avenged his earlier defeat by outpointing him over ten rounds.

On February 22, 1933, Grogan faced lightweight title contender and future three-division world champion Barney Ross. He was knocked down three times during the bout and ultimately lost on points. On April 17, Grogan faced reigning world light welterweight champion Battling Shaw in a non-title bout, losing by a one-sided decision.

Grogan retired from boxing in 1935, but returned nearly 15 years later to face Benny Smith in a four-round bout on January 17, 1950, in Memphis, Tennessee. Grogan was knocked out in the third round and retired permanently afterward, finishing his professional career with a record of 73–37–10, including 36 victories by knockout.

== Later life ==
During the 1940s, Grogan owned and operated a bar on West Farnam Street in his hometown of Omaha, Nebraska. In 1947, he relocated the establishment to 3702 North 16th Street and renamed it the Ringside Bar. The bar was ordered closed the following year after Grogan was found to have sold alcohol to an underage patron.

== Personal life ==
Grogan is of Irish descent.

== Professional boxing record ==
120 fights	73 wins	37 losses
By knockout	36	4
By decision	37	33
Draws	10	

No.	Result	Record	Opponent	Type	Round, time	Date	Location	Notes
120	Loss	73-37-10	Benny Smith	TKO	3 (4)	Jan 17, 1950	Memphis, Tennessee, U.S.	
119	Win	73-36-10	Frankie Cinque	DQ	2 (8)	Mar 16, 1935	Ridgewood Grove, Brooklyn, New York, U.S.	
118	Loss	72-36-10	Battling Shaw	PTS	10 (10)	Apr 17, 1933	Coliseum Arena, New Orleans, Louisiana, U.S.	
117	Win	72-35-10	Buddy Jackson	SD	10 (10)	Mar 28, 1933	Olympic Auditorium, Denver, Colorado, U.S.	
116	Loss	71-35-10	Barney Ross	PTS	10 (10)	Feb 22, 1933	Washington Blvd. Auditorium, Chicago, Illinois, U.S.	
115	Win	71-34-10	Cowboy Eddie Anderson	PTS	10 (10)	Feb 13, 1933	Auditorium, St. Joseph, Missouri, U.S.	
114	Loss	70-34-10	Curtis Brown	PTS	10 (10)	Nov 15, 1932	Auditorium, Milwaukee, Wisconsin, U.S.	
113	Win	70-33-10	John Smogye	KO	3 (10)	Oct 31, 1932	City Auditorium, Omaha, Nebraska, U.S.	
112	Loss	69-33-10	Wesley Ramey	PTS	10 (10)	Oct 26, 1932	Grand Rapids, Michigan, U.S.	
111	Win	69-32-10	KO Larson	KO	7 (10)	Sep 28, 1932	Lincoln, Nebraska, U.S.	
110	Win	68-32-10	Goldie Hess	PTS	10 (10)	Aug 1, 1932	League Park, Omaha, Nebraska, U.S.	
109	Loss	67-32-10	Billy Petrolle	UD	10 (10)	Jun 15, 1932	Greenlee Field, Pittsburgh, Pennsylvania, U.S.	
108	Loss	67-31-10	Goldie Hess	KO	1 (10)	May 23, 1932	Civic Auditorium, San Francisco, California, U.S.	
107	Win	67-30-10	Lloyd Smith	RTD	6 (10)	May 13, 1932	Legion Stadium, Hollywood, Los Angeles, California, U.S.	
106	Win	66-30-10	Johnny Lamar	PTS	10 (10)	Apr 29, 1932	Legion Stadium, Hollywood, Los Angeles, California, U.S.	
105	Loss	65-30-10	Harry Dublinsky	NWS	10 (10)	Mar 17, 1932	Auditorium, St. Paul, Minnesota, U.S.	
104	Win	65-29-10	Billy Vaughn	PTS	10 (10)	Mar 11, 1932	City Auditorium, Omaha, Nebraska, U.S.	
103	Win	64-29-10	Cowboy Eddie Anderson	PTS	10 (10)	Feb 22, 1932	City Auditorium, Omaha, Nebraska, U.S.	
102	Win	63-29-10	Millio Millitti	PTS	10 (10)	Jan 29, 1932	City Auditorium, Omaha, Nebraska, U.S.	
101	Win	62-29-10	Iowa Joe Rivers	KO	6 (8)	Dec 28, 1931	City Auditorium, Omaha, Nebraska, U.S.	
100	Win	61-29-10	Slick Jesnick	NWS	10 (10)	Nov 2, 1931	Cedar Rapids, Iowa, U.S.	
99	Win	60-29-10	Billy Hoon	NWS	10 (10)	Oct 19, 1931	Memorial Coliseum, Cedar Rapids, Iowa, U.S.	
98	Win	59-29-10	Billy Hoon	NWS	10 (10)	May 15, 1931	Clinton, Iowa, U.S.	
97	Loss	58-29-10	Harry Dublinsky	PTS	8 (8)	May 8, 1931	Chicago Stadium, Chicago, Illinois, U.S.	
96	Win	58-28-10	Herman Perlick	KO	2 (10)	Apr 30, 1931	Kalamazoo, Michigan, U.S.	
95	Win	57-28-10	Iowa Joe Rivers	KO	6 (10)	Apr 24, 1931	Cedar Rapids, Iowa, U.S.	
94	Loss	56-28-10	Joey Goodman	PTS	10 (10)	Apr 14, 1931	Public Hall, Cleveland, Ohio, U.S.	
93	Loss	56-27-10	Tony Canzoneri	PTS	10 (10)	Mar 23, 1931	Arena, Philadelphia, Pennsylvania, U.S.	
92	Win	56-26-10	Herman Perlick	PTS	10 (10)	Feb 20, 1931	Madison Square Garden, New York City, New York, U.S.	
91	Loss	55-26-10	Mickey Cohen	NWS	10 (10)	Feb 10, 1931	Kansas City, Missouri, U.S.	
90	Win	55-25-10	Harry Dublinsky	PTS	10 (10)	Jan 26, 1931	Olympia Stadium, Detroit, Michigan, U.S.	
89	Win	54-25-10	Young Joe Firpo	PTS	10 (10)	Jan 5, 1931	Arena, Philadelphia, Pennsylvania, U.S.	
88	Win	53-25-10	Eddie Ran	NWS	8 (8)	Jan 2, 1931	Arena, St. Louis, Missouri, U.S.	
87	Win	52-25-10	Millio Millitti	PTS	10 (10)	Dec 5, 1930	City Auditorium, Omaha, Nebraska, U.S.	
86	Win	51-25-10	Billy Wallace	NWS	10 (10)	Nov 24, 1930	Des Moines, Iowa, U.S.	
85	Loss	50-25-10	Johnny Jadick	PTS	10 (10)	Nov 17, 1930	Arena, Philadelphia, Pennsylvania, U.S.	
84	Win	50-24-10	Urban Liberty	KO	2 (10)	Nov 7, 1930	Auditorium, Sioux City, Iowa, U.S.	
83	Loss	49-24-10	Mickey Cohen	NWS	10 (10)	Sep 25, 1930	Kansas City, Missouri, U.S.	
82	Loss	49-23-10	Eddie Elkins	PTS	10 (10)	Sep 19, 1930	City Auditorium, Omaha, Nebraska, U.S.	
81	Loss	49-22-10	Bruce Flowers	KO	1	Aug 5, 1930	Queensboro Stadium, Long Island City, Queens, New York, U.S.	
80	Loss	49-21-10	Tony Canzoneri	PTS	10 (10)	Jun 24, 1930	Queensboro Stadium, Long Island City, Queens, New York, U.S.	
79	Draw	49-20-10	Sammy Mandell	PTS	10 (10)	May 9, 1930	Ak-Sar-Ben Coliseum, Omaha, Nebraska, U.S.	
78	Loss	49-20-9	Cowboy Eddie Anderson	NWS	10 (10)	Apr 14, 1930	Coliseum, Des Moines, Iowa, U.S.	
77	Loss	49-19-9	Tony Herrera	PTS	10 (10)	Mar 24, 1930	Ak-Sar-Ben Coliseum, Omaha, Nebraska, U.S.	
76	Loss	49-18-9	Cowboy Eddie Anderson	NWS	10 (10)	Mar 3, 1930	Coliseum, Des Moines, Iowa, U.S.	
75	Loss	49-17-9	Tony Herrera	PTS	10 (10)	Feb 17, 1930	Flint, Michigan, U.S.	
74	Win	49-16-9	Lope Tenorio	PTS	10 (10)	Feb 10, 1930	City Auditorium, Omaha, Nebraska, U.S.	
73	Win	48-16-9	Tony Ligouri	KO	2 (10)	Feb 3, 1930	Coliseum, Des Moines, Iowa, U.S.	
72	Win	47-16-9	Billy McMahon	PTS	10 (10)	Jan 20, 1930	St. Nicholas Arena, New York City, New York, U.S.	
71	Win	46-16-9	Joey Kaufman	TKO	4 (10)	Jan 10, 1930	North Omaha Athletic Club, Omaha, Nebraska, U.S.	
70	Win	45-16-9	Joe Glick	PTS	10 (10)	Dec 6, 1929	Dreamland Auditorium, San Francisco, California, U.S.	
69	Draw	44-16-9	Joe Guerrero	PTS	10 (10)	Nov 15, 1929	Dreamland Auditorium, San Francisco, California, U.S.	
68	Win	44-16-8	Lope Tenorio	PTS	10 (10)	Oct 25, 1929	City Auditorium, Omaha, Nebraska, U.S.	
67	Loss	43-16-8	Charlie Greenberg	DQ	7 (10)	Oct 10, 1929	Auditorium, Milwaukee, Wisconsin, U.S.	
66	Loss	43-15-8	Billy Wallace	PTS	10 (10)	Aug 14, 1929	Taylor Bowl, Newburgh Heights, Ohio, U.S.	
65	Loss	43-14-8	Billy Wallace	PTS	10 (10)	Jul 10, 1929	Taylor Bowl, Newburgh Heights, Ohio, U.S.	
64	Win	43-13-8	Johnny Jadick	PTS	10 (10)	Jun 18, 1929	Fair Grounds Arena, Allentown, Pennsylvania, U.S.	
63	Loss	42-13-8	Luis Vicentini	DQ	6 (10)	Jun 10, 1929	Chicago Stadium, Chicago, Illinois, U.S.	
62	Win	42-12-8	Johnny Mellow	TKO	7 (10)	May 24, 1929	City Auditorium, Omaha, Nebraska, U.S.	
61	Loss	41-12-8	Johnny Mellow	DQ	2	Apr 19, 1929	Olympia Stadium, Detroit, Michigan, U.S.	
60	Loss	41-11-8	Billy Wallace	PTS	10 (10)	Apr 11, 1929	Olympia Stadium, Detroit, Michigan, U.S.	
59	Win	41-10-8	Russie LeRoy	KO	7 (10)	Mar 22, 1929	City Auditorium, Omaha, Nebraska, U.S.	
58	Win	40-10-8	Nat Kawler	KO	7 (10)	Feb 15, 1929	Ak-Sar-Ben Coliseum, Omaha, Nebraska, U.S.	
57	Loss	39-10-8	Ray Miller	PTS	10 (10)	Feb 1, 1929	Olympia Stadium, Detroit, Michigan, U.S.	
56	Loss	39-9-8	Ray Miller	KO	4 (10)	Jan 11, 1929	Olympia Stadium, Detroit, Michigan, U.S.	
55	Win	39-8-8	Lew Kirsch	PTS	10 (10)	Dec 14, 1928	Madison Square Garden, New York City, New York, U.S.	
54	Win	38-8-8	Bobby Burns	PTS	10 (10)	Nov 26, 1928	Broadway Arena, Brooklyn, New York, U.S.	
53	Win	37-8-8	Bobby Garcia	TKO	2 (10)	Nov 12, 1928	Auditorium, Omaha, Nebraska, U.S.	
52	Loss	36-8-8	Cowboy Eddie Anderson	PTS	10 (10)	Nov 1, 1928	Omaha, Nebraska, U.S.	
51	Loss	36-7-8	Joe Glick	PTS	10 (10)	Oct 5, 1928	Madison Square Garden, New York City, New York, U.S.	
50	Win	36-6-8	Sammy White	PTS	10 (10)	Sep 24, 1928	Dexter Park Arena, Woodhaven, Queens, New York, U.S.	
49	Win	35-6-8	Al Bryant	TKO	9 (10)	Sep 18, 1928	Queensboro Stadium, Long Island City, Queens, New York, U.S.	
48	Win	34-6-8	Jack Duffy	KO	6 (10)	Sep 7, 1928	Olympia Stadium, Detroit, Michigan, U.S.	
47	Win	33-6-8	Ruby Stein	TKO	4 (8)	Aug 21, 1928	Queensboro Stadium, Long Island City, Queens, New York, U.S.	
46	Win	32-6-8	Fernando Fiorillo	KO	1 (8)	Aug 15, 1928	Ebbets Field, Brooklyn, New York, U.S.	
45	Win	31-6-8	Sid Barbarian	TKO	4 (10)	Jul 25, 1928	Ebbets Field, Brooklyn, New York, U.S.	
44	Win	30-6-8	Augie Pisano	KO	1 (10)	Jun 1, 1928	Omaha, Nebraska, U.S.	
43	Win	29-6-8	Billy Petrolle	TKO	7 (10)	Apr 27, 1928	City Auditorium, Omaha, Nebraska, U.S.	
42	Win	28-6-8	Cowboy Eddie Anderson	PTS	10 (10)	Apr 16, 1928	City Auditorium, Omaha, Nebraska, U.S.	
41	Draw	27-6-8	Cowboy Eddie Anderson	PTS	10 (10)	Mar 30, 1928	Athletic Club, Omaha, Nebraska, U.S.	
40	Loss	27-6-7	Joey Medill	PTS	10 (10)	Mar 9, 1928	City Auditorium, Omaha, Nebraska, U.S.	
39	Win	27-5-7	Lou Paluso	PTS	10 (10)	Feb 27, 1928	Athletic Club, Omaha, Nebraska, U.S.	
38	Win	26-5-7	Babe Ruth	KO	1 (10)	Feb 10, 1928	City Auditorium, Omaha, Nebraska, U.S.	
37	Win	25-5-7	Mike Ballerino	TKO	4 (10)	Jan 20, 1928	Omaha, Nebraska, U.S.	
36	Win	24-5-7	Eddie Sylvester	KO	2 (10)	Jan 6, 1928	City Auditorium, Omaha, Nebraska, U.S.	
35	Win	23-5-7	Ray Schaeffer	TKO	7 (10)	Dec 20, 1927	City Auditorium, Omaha, Nebraska, U.S.	
34	Draw	22-5-7	Buster Brown	PTS	10 (10)	Dec 7, 1927	Kansas City, Missouri, U.S.	
33	Win	22-5-6	Eddie DeBeau	KO	9 (10)	Dec 2, 1927	Auditorium, Omaha, Nebraska, U.S.	
32	Win	21-5-6	Lou Avery	KO	7 (10)	Nov 18, 1927	Armour Arena, St. Joseph, Missouri, U.S.	
31	Win	20-5-6	Bobby Duffy	KO	4 (10)	Oct 22, 1927	Cudahy Recreation Hall, Sioux City, Iowa, U.S.	
30	Win	19-5-6	Bobby Duffy	KO	3 (10)	Sep 16, 1927	Cudahy A.C., Omaha, Nebraska, U.S.	
29	Draw	18-5-6	Jackie Kane	PTS	10 (10)	Sep 6, 1927	Olympic Auditorium, Denver, Colorado, U.S.	
28	Win	18-5-5	Don Davis	PTS	6 (6)	Jun 24, 1927	Wrigley Field, Chicago, Illinois, U.S.	
27	Loss	17-5-5	Joey Medill	PTS	6 (6)	May 31, 1927	Wrigley Field, Chicago, Illinois, U.S.	
26	Win	17-4-5	Carl Duane	PTS	10 (10)	May 3, 1927	Coliseum, Chicago, Illinois, U.S.	
25	Win	16-4-5	Billy Kennedy	TKO	3 (8)	Mar 26, 1927	Coliseum, Chicago, Illinois, U.S.	
24	Draw	15-4-5	Merle Alte	NWS	6 (6)	Mar 15, 1927	Terre Haute, Indiana, U.S.	
23	Win	15-4-4	Don Davis	PTS	10 (10)	Mar 8, 1927	Eagles Hall, Chicago, Illinois, U.S.	
22	Win	14-4-4	Johnny Murphy	TKO	4 (8)	Feb 15, 1927	Tomlinson Hall, Indianapolis, Indiana, U.S.	
21	Draw	13-4-4	Armando Santiago	PTS	8 (8)	Jan 20, 1927	Coliseum, Chicago, Illinois, U.S.	
20	Draw	13-4-3	Buster Brown	NWS	10 (10)	Nov 12, 1926	Armour Arena, St. Joseph, Missouri, U.S.	
19	Win	13-4-2	Babe Ridley	TKO	7 (10)	Oct 29, 1926	Cudahy A.C., Omaha, Nebraska, U.S.	
18	Win	12-4-2	Battling Clemons	RTD	3 (10)	Sep 17, 1926	Armour Arena, St. Joseph, Missouri, U.S.	
17	Loss	11-4-2	Buster Brown	PTS	10 (10)	Jul 2, 1926	League Park, Omaha, Nebraska, U.S.	
16	Win	11-3-2	Jimmy Josephs	TKO	9 (10)	Mar 12, 1926	Cudahy A.C., Omaha, Nebraska, U.S.	
15	Loss	10-3-2	Joey Clein	PTS	10 (10)	Jan 29, 1926	Grand Island, Nebraska, U.S.	For Nebraska Athletic Commission featherweight title
14	Win	10-2-2	Frank Conley	PTS	10 (10)	Nov 13, 1925	Omaha, Nebraska, U.S.	
13	Loss	9-2-2	Frank Larrabee	PTS	6 (6)	Oct 3, 1925	Omaha, Nebraska, U.S.	For Nebraska State featherweight title
12	Win	9-1-2	Jimmy O'Neill	KO	4 (10)	Sep 16, 1925	Cascade, Iowa, U.S.	
11	Draw	8-1-2	Matt Smith	PTS	10 (10)	Sep 4, 1925	Omaha, Nebraska, U.S.	
10	Draw	8-1-1	Eddie Nemo	NWS	10 (10)	May 16, 1925	Cudahy Recreation Hall, Sioux City, Iowa, U.S.	
9	Win	8-1-0	Frank Larrabee	PTS	10 (10)	May 8, 1925	Cudahy Club Gym, Omaha, Nebraska, U.S.	
8	Win	7-1-0	Frankie Rand	KO	2 (6)	Apr 6, 1925	Elks Building Auditorium, Omaha, Nebraska, U.S.	
7	Win	6-1-0	Young Kid Bruno	PTS	4 (4)	Mar 20, 1925	Auditorium, Omaha, Nebraska, U.S.	
6	Loss	5-1-0	Sammy Cross	PTS	4 (4)	Feb 7, 1925	Elks Building Auditorium, Omaha, Nebraska, U.S.	
5	Win	5-0-0	Young Kid Bruno	PTS	4 (4)	Jan 30, 1925	City Auditorium, Omaha, Nebraska, U.S.	
4	Win	4-0-0	Leo Krupski	PTS	4 (4)	Nov 21, 1924	Auditorium, Omaha, Nebraska, U.S.	
3	Win	3-0-0	Kid Fredericks	TKO	2 (4)	Nov 7, 1924	Auditorium, Omaha, Nebraska, U.S.	
2	Win	2-0-0	Jimmy Whalen	DQ	1 (4)	Oct 17, 1924	Omaha, Nebraska, U.S.	
1	Win	1-0-0	Jimmy Mardi	PTS	4 (4)	Sep 19, 1924	Auditorium, Omaha, Nebraska, U.S.	

== See also ==
- List of male boxers
