= James Kelso =

James Kelso may refer to:

- James Kelso (footballer) (1869–1900), Scottish footballer
- Jim Kelso, also known as James Kelso (1910–1987), Scottish footballer
- Jimmy Kelso (1910–?), Australian professional feather/light/welterweight boxer

== See also ==
- Jamie Kelso (born 1948), American white supremacist and member of the Sea Org
