= Kelso (name) =

Kelso is a surname and a given name. It is of British origin with Scottish and English roots. Earlier form Calchow, from Middle Welsh Calchvynyð (modern Welsh Calchfynydd), "lime mountain".

== People with the surname ==
- Ben Kelso (born 1949), American basketball player and coach
- Beverley Kelso (born 1948), Jamaican singer
- Bill Kelso (1940-2009), Major League Baseball pitcher
- Bob Kelso (footballer) (1865-1942), Scottish football player
- Frank B. Kelso II (1933–2013), United States Navy admiral
- Iris Kelso (1926-2003), American journalist and television commentator
- J. A. Scott Kelso (born 1947), Northern Irish-born American neuroscientist
- J. J. Kelso (1864-1935), creator of the Children's Aid Society in Canada
- Jack W. Kelso (1934-1952), Medal of Honor recipient
- Jackie Kelso (1922-2012), American jazz saxophonist, flautist, and clarinetist
- James Kelso (footballer) (1869-1900), footballer
- JC Kelso Scottish musician and Writer. Aka: Joe Cowan. Singer-Songwriter with EMI and Chrysalis Records back in the 1980s and 1990s. Still active as a solo artist as of 2026
- Jim Kelso (1910-1987), Scottish football player
- Jimmy Kelso (1910-?), Australian boxer of the 1920s and '30s
- John R. Kelso (1831-1891), politician and author
- Iain Kelso (born 1975), Canadian film score composer
- Louis O. Kelso (1913-1991), political economist
- Mark Kelso (born 1963), former Buffalo Bills defensive back
- Mayme Kelso (1867-1946), American actress
- Megan Kelso (born 1968), comic book artist
- Phil Kelso (1871-1935), Scottish football player
- Sylvia Kelso, Australian author
- Tommy Kelso (1882-1974), Scottish footballer
- Thomas Kelso (1784-1878), philanthropist
- William Kelso (born 1941), archeologist

== People with the given name ==
- Kelso Roberts, Canadian politician
- Kelso Cochrane (~1936-1959), Antiguan immigrant to Britain whose murder sparked tensions in London

== People with the stage name ==
- Kelso, bass player with Camp Cope released an album under this moniker.

== Fictional characters ==
- Bob Kelso, Chief of Medicine from Scrubs
- Michael Kelso, character on That '70s Show
  - Michael's children, Jay and Betsy Kelso from That '90s Show
- Casey Kelso, That '70s Show character
- Wyoming Bill Kelso, character in The Party
- Jack Kelso, character in L.A. Noire
- Capt. Wild Bill Kelso in 1941
- Zeke Kelso, FBI Agent in That Darn Cat! and That Darn Cat (1997 film)

== See also ==
- Kelso (disambiguation)
