= Kelso High School =

Kelso High School may refer to:

- Kelso High School, Scotland
- Kelso High School (Washington), United States
- Kelso High Campus (formerly Kelso High School), New South Wales, Australia

== See also ==
- Kelso (disambiguation)
