= Vic Patrick =

Australian boxer

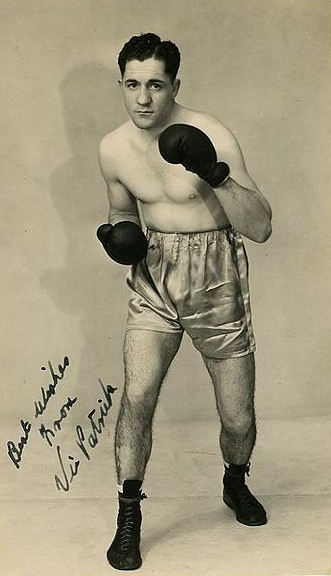
- Vic Patrick c. 1948

Personal information
- Nationality: Australian
- Born: 2 June 1920 Sydney, Australia
- Died: 11 August 2006 (aged 86) Sydney, Australia
- Height: 1.70 m (5 ft 7 in)
- Weight: Lightweight

Boxing career
- Reach: 1.73 m (5 ft 8 in)
- Stance: Southpaw

Boxing record
- Total fights: 57
- Wins: 52
- Win by KO: 45
- Losses: 4
- Draws: 1

Victor Patrick Lucca (2 June 1920 – 11 August 2006) was an Australian professional boxer and referee.

Patrick was born to an oyster farmer and took up boxing in 1940 to earn money. He first fought under the name Alf Edwards, so that his mother would not know he was boxing. He won his first 18 bouts, 17 of them by knockout. He then lost to Tod Morgan via an unintentional foul, but won their next bout, along with the national lightweight title. He defended it two months later, again against Morgan, and in 1942 captured the Australian welterweight title. He kept the lightweight title until retirement in 1948, but relinquished the welterweight title in 1946.

After retiring Patrick had a long career as a referee. He also played himself in a boxing documentary Fighting Blood (1951 film). In 1986 he was inducted into the Sport Australia Hall of Fame as an athlete, and in 1996 upgraded to "Legend of Australian Sport". In 1987 he was awarded the Medal of the Order of Australia, and in 2003 inducted into the Australian National Boxing Hall of Fame.
