= Kelso Site =

- U.S. National Register of Historic Places
- Nearest city: Mullen, Nebraska
- Area: 4 acres (1.6 ha)
- NRHP reference No.: 74001123
- Added to NRHP: January 21, 1974

The Kelso Site, near Mullen in Hooker County, Nebraska, United States, was listed on the National Register of Historic Places in 1974.

It was the site of a prehistoric village. The archeological site is designated by Smithsonian trinomial of 25 HO 23.

According to Nebraska History: "Kelso is located on a sand dune overlooking the Middle Loup River near the town of Mullen. It is important as a rare example of a little known Woodland culture of the Sand Hills, Panhandle, and eastern Colorado dating A.D. 500-1100."

The archeological site was partially excavated in 1947, when the proposed Mullen Reservoir project was planned. This was "the only major excavation of a Woodland site in the Sand Hills proper. Approximately one-quarter of the Kelso site was excavated. Two hearths were uncovered, but storage pits or architectural ruins were not located. Artifacts included pottery, stone tools, animal remains, and a bone awl. The animal bone sample reflected an emphasis on smaller game. The site is somewhere between 950 and 1,350 years old."

== See also ==
- Humphrey Archeological Site
