= Goldie Hess =

American boxer (1909–1994)

Personal information
- Nickname: Paulino of Ocean Park
- Born: Golden "Goldie" William Hess; September 14, 1909 Illinois, U.S.
- Died: November 7, 1994 (aged 85) Redondo Beach, California, U.S.
- Height: 5 ft 6 in (168 cm)
- Weight: Featherweight; Super featherweight Lightweight; Light welterweight

Boxing career

Boxing record
- Total fights: 77
- Wins: 47
- Win by KO: 15
- Losses: 22
- Draws: 8

Goldie Hess (born Golden William Hess; September 14, 1909 – November 7, 1994) was an American professional boxer who competed from 1926 to 1934. He held the Pacific Coast lightweight title in 1930. Hess also challenged Jack Kid Berg for the NBA light welterweight title in 1931.

== Boxing career ==
Fighting out of Ocean Park, Santa Monica, Hess compiled a 34–3–3 record over his first 40 professional bouts, all of which took place in California, including victories over Al Carreon and George Savage.

In April 1929, Hess debuted in The Ring magazine's divisional rankings as the world's No. 4-ranked featherweight contender. After outpointing Santiago Zorrilla over ten rounds, Hess was scheduled to face former NBA bantamweight champion Bud Taylor on June 4, 1929. However, a hand injury suffered by Taylor forced the bout to be postponed until June 11, when the two fought to a ten-round draw. That same month, Hess made his first appearance in The Ring's super featherweight rankings at No. 8.

On July 9, 1929, Hess faced reigning world super featherweight champion Tod Morgan in a non-title bout, earning a ten-round decision victory. Morgan suffered bruised ribs during the fight that left him sore for several weeks afterward. Following the victory, Hess rose to a career-high No. 1 ranking among the world's super featherweight contenders.

Hess was scheduled to face former world featherweight champion and future three-division world champion Tony Canzoneri in a ten-round bout on February 7, 1930. However, Canzoneri was forced to withdraw due to cuts above his eyes sustained in his recent bout with Jack Kid Berg. On July 1, 1930, Hess faced Johnny Lamar, who had recently been presented with the Pacific Coast lightweight championship belt by the Hollywood Legion. Hess dropped Lamar with a right to the jaw in the seventh round and floored him again in the eighth en route to a decision victory, wresting the title from Lamar. Three fights later on August 26, Hess finally met Canzoneri in a ten-round bout at Queensboro Stadium in Long Island City, Queens. Aside from a cut over Canzoneri's right eye caused by an accidental clash of heads in the sixth round, Hess was thoroughly outclassed throughout the bout. Despite absorbing a sustained barrage of punches, Hess managed to remain on his feet for the full ten rounds before losing by decision.

On January 23, 1931, Hess entered as a 3-to-1 underdog when he challenged Jack Kid Berg for the NBA light welterweight title in a ten-round bout at Chicago Stadium. The two engaged in a fiercely contested battle, but Berg ultimately prevailed by decision to retain his title. Hess was scheduled to face Tony Canzoneri in a rematch on February 4, but the bout was canceled after Hess contracted influenza. Hess next fought Tod Morgan in a rematch for the California State Athletic Commission lightweight title. Entering as a slight underdog, Hess lost by decision over ten rounds. Hess next fought Bobby Pacho to a draw on May 8 before losing their rematch three weeks later. On July 1, he faced Tod Morgan in a rubber match at the Civic Ice Arena in Seattle, Washington, where he was outpointed over eight rounds. On July 13, Hess faced Pacho for the third and final time at Wrigley Field in Los Angeles, losing by decision over ten rounds.

On February 25, 1932, Hess faced Young Peter Jackson for the California State Athletic Commission lightweight title, losing by decision over ten rounds. On April 5, Hess defeated Roy Ockley in a close decision. On May 23, Hess faced Tommy Grogan at the Civic Auditorium in San Francisco, knocking him out just 17 seconds into the first round with a right hook followed by a left jab to the jaw. However, Grogan avenged the loss ten weeks later, outpointing Hess over ten rounds in a rematch. On November 11, Hess faced lightweight title contender and future three-division world champion Barney Ross at Chicago Stadium. Ross dominated the bout, landing punches at will with machine-gun-like speed and repeatedly staggering Hess, who managed to remain on his feet despite appearing close to being knocked down several times. Hess ultimately lost by unanimous decision, having been outpointed in every round.

After a layoff of more than two years, Hess returned to the ring on December 14, 1934, challenging Hubert Kid Dennis for the Montana State lightweight title. Having previously boasted that he had never been knocked off his feet, Hess was knocked out in the second round, suffering the only knockout loss of his career in what proved to be his final professional fight.

Hess retired with a professional record of 47–22–8, including 15 wins by knockout. From April 1929 through March 1930, he spent nine months ranked among the top eight contenders in his division by The Ring.

== Later life ==
Hess resided in Redondo Beach, California. Following his retirement from boxing, he remained involved in the sport as a manager, working with fighters such as Georgie Crouch.

== Personal life ==
Hess was Jewish. His brother Charlie was also a professional boxer. Hess was married to his wife, Helen, with whom he had a daughter, Diane, born in 1935.

== Professional boxing record ==
77 fights	47 wins	22 losses
By knockout	15	1
By decision	32	21
Draws	8	

No.	Result	Record	Opponent	Type	Round	Date	Location	Notes
77	Loss	47-22-8	Hubert Kid Dennis	KO	2 (10)	Dec 14, 1934	Fox Theater, Butte, Montana, U.S.	For Montana State lightweight title
76	Loss	47-21-8	Barney Ross	UD	10	Nov 11, 1932	Chicago Stadium, Chicago, Illinois, U.S.	
75	Loss	47-20-8	Mike Stankovich	PTS	10	Sep 7, 1932	Wilmington Bowl, Wilmington, California, U.S.	
74	Draw	47-19-8	Eddie Mack	PTS	10	Aug 8, 1932	Hopewell Field Arena, Albuquerque, New Mexico, U.S.	
73	Loss	47-19-7	Tommy Grogan	PTS	10	Aug 1, 1932	League Park, Omaha, Nebraska, U.S.	
72	Win	47-18-7	Tommy Grogan	KO	1 (10)	May 23, 1932	Civic Auditorium, San Francisco, California, U.S.	
71	Loss	46-18-7	Ah Wing Lee	PTS	6	May 3, 1932	Auditorium, Portland, Oregon, U.S.	
70	Loss	46-17-7	Don Fraser	PTS	6	Apr 14, 1932	Auditorium Theater, Spokane, Washington, U.S.	
69	Win	46-16-7	Roy Ockley	PTS	6	Apr 5, 1932	Auditorium, Portland, Oregon, U.S.	
68	Win	45-16-7	Jesse Maxey	KO	3 (10)	Mar 28, 1932	Culver City Stadium, Culver City, California, U.S.	
67	Loss	44-16-7	Young Peter Jackson	PTS	10	Feb 25, 1932	Memorial Auditorium, Sacramento, California, U.S.	For California State Athletic Commission lightweight title
66	Loss	44-15-7	Charlie Miller	PTS	10	Jan 14, 1932	Memorial Auditorium, Sacramento, California, U.S.	
65	Win	44-14-7	Victor Kid Ponce	PTS	10	Dec 18, 1931	Imperial Valley A.C., El Centro, California, U.S.	
64	Loss	43-14-7	Bobby Pacho	PTS	10	Jul 13, 1931	Wrigley Field, Los Angeles, California, U.S.	
63	Loss	43-13-7	Tod Morgan	PTS	8	Jul 1, 1931	Civic Ice Arena, Seattle, Washington, U.S.	
62	Loss	43-12-7	Bobby Pacho	PTS	10	May 29, 1931	Legion Stadium, Hollywood, California, U.S.	
61	Draw	43-11-7	Bobby Pacho	PTS	10	May 8, 1931	Legion Stadium, Hollywood, California, U.S.	
60	Loss	43-11-6	Tod Morgan	PTS	10	Mar 24, 1931	Olympic Auditorium, Los Angeles, California, U.S.	For California State Athletic Commission lightweight title
59	Loss	43-10-6	Jack Kid Berg	UD	10	Jan 23, 1931	Chicago Stadium, Chicago, Illinois, U.S.	For NBA light welterweight title
58	Draw	43-9-6	Johnny Gonzales	PTS	10	Jan 14, 1931	Wilmington Bowl, Wilmington, California, U.S.	
57	Loss	43-9-5	Maurice Holtzer	PTS	10	Oct 14, 1930	Olympic Auditorium, Los Angeles, California, U.S.	
56	Loss	43-8-5	Hector McDonald	PTS	10	Sep 12, 1930	Legion Stadium, Hollywood, California, U.S.	
55	Loss	43-7-5	Tony Canzoneri	PTS	10	Aug 26, 1930	Queensboro Stadium, Long Island City, Queens, New York, U.S.	
54	Win	43-6-5	Ritchie King	PTS	10	Jul 18, 1930	Legion Stadium, Hollywood, California, U.S.	
53	Win	42-6-5	Jimmy Fox	PTS	10	Jul 10, 1930	Culver City Stadium, Culver City, California, U.S.	
52	Win	41-6-5	Johnny Lamar	PTS	10	Jul 1, 1930	Olympic Auditorium, Los Angeles, California, U.S.	Won Pacific Coast lightweight title
51	Win	40-6-5	Eddie Thomas	PTS	10	Mar 25, 1930	Olympic Auditorium, Los Angeles, California, U.S.	
50	Loss	39-6-5	Eddie Mack	PTS	10	Mar 11, 1930	Olympic Auditorium, Los Angeles, California, U.S.	
49	Draw	39-5-5	Cecil Payne	PTS	10	Jan 7, 1930	Olympic Auditorium, Los Angeles, California, U.S.	
48	Win	39-5-4	Baby Sal Sorio	PTS	10	Dec 23, 1929	Olympic Auditorium, Los Angeles, California, U.S.	
47	Loss	38-5-4	Cecil Payne	PTS	10	Dec 10, 1929	Olympic Auditorium, Los Angeles, California, U.S.	
46	Win	38-4-4	Gaston Charles	PTS	10	Nov 12, 1929	Olympic Auditorium, Los Angeles, California, U.S.	
45	Loss	37-4-4	Eddie Mack	PTS	10	Sep 17, 1929	Olympic Auditorium, Los Angeles, California, U.S.	
44	Win	37-3-4	Leslie Wildcat Carter	TKO	10 (10)	Sep 3, 1929	Olympic Auditorium, Los Angeles, California, U.S.	
43	Win	36-3-4	Tod Morgan	PTS	10	Jul 9, 1929	Olympic Auditorium, Los Angeles, California, U.S.	
42	Draw	35-3-4	Bud Taylor	PTS	10	Jun 11, 1929	Olympic Auditorium, Los Angeles, California, U.S.	
41	Win	35-3-3	Santiago Zorrilla	PTS	10	Apr 30, 1929	Olympic Auditorium, Los Angeles, California, U.S.	
40	Win	34-3-3	Clark Anderson	PTS	8	Apr 3, 1929	Ocean Park Arena, Santa Monica, California, U.S.	
39	Win	33-3-3	Bobby Fernandez	PTS	6	Mar 23, 1929	Main Street Athletic Club, Los Angeles, California, U.S.	
38	Loss	32-3-3	Jimmy Watts	PTS	10	Feb 26, 1929	Olympic Auditorium, Los Angeles, California, U.S.	
37	Win	32-2-3	George Savage	PTS	6	Feb 13, 1929	Ocean Park Arena, Santa Monica, California, U.S.	
36	Win	31-2-3	Charley Lupica	PTS	6	Jan 22, 1929	Olympic Auditorium, Los Angeles, California, U.S.	
35	Win	30-2-3	Bobby Fernandez	PTS	8	Jan 16, 1929	Ocean Park Arena, Santa Monica, California, U.S.	
34	Win	29-2-3	George Savage	TKO	1 (6)	Dec 12, 1928	Ocean Park Arena, Santa Monica, California, U.S.	
33	Win	28-2-3	Joe Pimentel	PTS	8	Nov 7, 1928	Ocean Park Arena, Santa Monica, California, U.S.	
32	Win	27-2-3	Benny Golden	PTS	6	Oct 16, 1928	Olympic Auditorium, Los Angeles, California, U.S.	
31	Win	26-2-3	Jimmy Black	PTS	8	Oct 3, 1928	Ocean Park Arena, Santa Monica, California, U.S.	
30	Win	25-2-3	Billy Hart	PTS	6	Sep 18, 1928	Olympic Auditorium, Los Angeles, California, U.S.	
29	Win	24-2-3	Billy Hart	PTS	8	May 25, 1928	El Centro Arena, El Centro, California, U.S.	
28	Win	23-2-3	Mike Cordova	PTS	8	Apr 18, 1928	Ocean Park Arena, Santa Monica, California, U.S.	
27	Win	22-2-3	Pat Sweeney	PTS	8	Apr 4, 1928	Ocean Park Arena, Santa Monica, California, U.S.	
26	Win	21-2-3	Wendell Red Humphries	PTS	8	Feb 22, 1928	Ocean Park Arena, Santa Monica, California, U.S.	
25	Win	20-2-3	Vernon Jackson	PTS	6	Feb 1, 1928	Wilmington Bowl, Wilmington, California, U.S.	
24	Win	19-2-3	Alejandro Carreon	PTS	8	Jan 4, 1928	Ocean Park Arena, Santa Monica, California, U.S.	
23	Loss	18-2-3	Jimmy Piela	PTS	6	Sep 30, 1927	Legion Stadium, Hollywood, California, U.S.	
22	Draw	18-1-3	Frankie Aragon	PTS	10	Sep 23, 1927	Imperial Valley A.C., El Centro, California, U.S.	
21	Win	18-1-2	Ralph Lincoln	PTS	6	Sep 7, 1927	Ocean Park Arena, Santa Monica, California, U.S.	
20	Win	17-1-2	Pat Duncan	TKO	9 (10)	Aug 26, 1927	Imperial Valley A.C., El Centro, California, U.S.	
19	Win	16-1-2	Rocky Rosales	KO	2 (4)	Aug 12, 1927	Legion Stadium, Hollywood, California, U.S.	
18	Win	15-1-2	Art Craig	PTS	6	Aug 3, 1927	Ocean Park Arena, Santa Monica, California, U.S.	
17	Win	14-1-2	Joe Rickey	PTS	6	Jun 15, 1927	Ocean Park Arena, Santa Monica, California, U.S.	
16	Win	13-1-2	Tommy Cleary	KO	2 (6)	May 25, 1927	Ocean Park Arena, Santa Monica, California, U.S.	
15	Draw	12-1-2	Freddie Albin	PTS	6	May 11, 1927	Wilmington Bowl, Wilmington, California, U.S.	
14	Win	12-1-1	Georgie Lopez	KO	4 (6)	May 4, 1927	Wilmington Bowl, Wilmington, California, U.S.	
13	Win	11-1-1	Johnny Alvarez	KO	1 (4)	Apr 27, 1927	Ocean Park Arena, Santa Monica, California, U.S.	
12	Win	10-1-1	Mike Marujo	KO	3 (4)	Apr 13, 1927	Ocean Park Arena, Santa Monica, California, U.S.	
11	Win	9-1-1	Ray Molina	KO	1 (4)	Mar 30, 1927	Ocean Park Arena, Santa Monica, California, U.S.	
10	Win	8-1-1	Charley Wall	TKO	1 (4)	Mar 10, 1927	Culver City Stadium, Culver City, California, U.S.	
9	Loss	7-1-1	Patsy McGrath	PTS	4	Feb 25, 1927	Legion Stadium, Hollywood, California, U.S.	
8	Win	7-0-1	Emanuel Thomas	PTS	4	Feb 10, 1927	Culver City Stadium, Culver City, California, U.S.	
7	Win	6-0-1	Herb Turchi	PTS	4	Feb 4, 1927	Legion Stadium, Hollywood, California, U.S.	
6	Draw	5-0-1	Herb Turchi	PTS	4	Jan 20, 1927	Culver City, California, U.S.	
5	Win	5-0-0	Louie Contreras	KO	1 (?)	Dec 9, 1926	Culver City, California, U.S.	
4	Win	4-0-0	Joe Clifton	KO	? (4)	Nov 18, 1926	Culver City, California, U.S.	
3	Win	3-0-0	Lou Bozant	PTS	4	Nov 4, 1926	Culver City, California, U.S.	
2	Win	2-0-0	Marcel Huhat	PTS	4	Oct 21, 1926	Culver City, California, U.S.	
1	Win	1-0-0	Bobby Payne	KO	1 (4)	Oct 14, 1926	Culver City, California, U.S.	

== See also ==
- List of male boxers
