= Tod Morgan =

American boxer (1902–1953)

Personal information
- Born: Albert Morgan Pilkington; December 25, 1902 Dungeness, Washington, U.S.
- Died: August 3, 1953 (aged 50) Seattle, Washington, U.S.
- Height: 5 ft 7.5 in (1.71 m)
- Weight: Junior Lightweight

Boxing career
- Reach: 71 in (180 cm)
- Stance: Orthodox

Boxing record
- Total fights: 218
- Wins: 138
- Win by KO: 29
- Losses: 45
- Draws: 33
- No contests: 2

Albert Morgan Pilkington (December 25, 1902 – August 3, 1953), better known as Tod Morgan, was an American boxer who took the Undisputed World Super Featherweight Championship in 1925 in Los Angeles and held it for an impressive four years. His managers were his stepfather Frank Morgan, and later Frank Churchill, who also trained Mike Ballerino, a former Jr. Lightweight champion. His trainer was "Spider" Roach.

== Early life and career ==
Morgan was born in the small town of Dungeness, Washington, near Sequim, on December 25, 1902.

Tod's stepfather, Fred, put Tod in boxing as a means of getting some strength into his body. His first professional fights were in 1920, in Concrete, and Anacortes, Washington, against Johnny Bitoni, and Pete Moe, who knocked him out. After these two bouts, his stepfather Fred moved him to California. After arriving in Eureka where he fought two bouts with George Green, his stepfather began training him in the backroom of the Hoffman House in Vallejo, California, a soft-drink parlor and lunch room. Tod's first fight in Valejo was around October 1920.

On May 24, 1922, Morgan defeated California boxer Ad Rubidoux at the Oakland Arena in Oakland, California in a ten-round points decision. The bout was fiercely fought and considered the most interesting of the bouts fought that night.

== Taking the Pacific Coast Featherweight Title, August 1923 ==
Morgan first took the Pacific Coast Title on August 22, 1923, against Bud Ridley in a six-round decision in Seattle. In a decisive win, he outpointed Ridley in every round but the opening of the sixth. As in previous fights, Morgan used his left to keep his opponent at a distance. Ridley's crouching style was ineffective against the left of Morgan.

In another six round points decision, Morgan defended his Pacific Coast Title on September 5, 1923, against Ridley in a rematch in Seattle. Most ringside critics felt that Morgan had defeated Ridley even more decisively than in their first match. Morgan outboxed, outslugged, and effectively out maneuvered his opponent. Morgan landed far more punches than Ridley, who showed gameness, but was clearly outmatched.

On January 22, 1924, Morgan knocked out accomplished boxer Frankie Britt in the third round at Crystal Pool in Seattle, Washington, retaining the Pacific Coast Featherweight Title.

=== Wins over Joe Gorman ===
Morgan's first meeting with Joe Gorman on February 26, 1924, ended in a six-round draw. As the bout was non-title due to Gorman's weight of 130, the bout was tame, and Morgan landed blows easily, though not with great steam. Some ringside felt Morgan had the edge in the bout.

On December 30, 1924, Morgan defeated Doc Snell at the Crystal Pool in Seattle, Washington in a six-round points decision. He had drawn with Snell two weeks earlier in Tacoma. In their Tacoma bout, several critics ringside felt Morgan had the edge, but the boxing was fast and probably close. Snell would take the Pacific Coast Featherweight Title in January 1927, and would later take the Pacific Coast Jr. Lightweight Title. He had formerly held the North Central Washington Featherweight Title.

On June 28, 1927, Morgan would lose to Snell in an unusual six round outdoor bout in Seattle. In the first two rounds, Morgan used his left jab cautiously to control Snell and defend against him, although Snell seemed to have an advantage in the third. Morgan floored Snell twice in the fourth round, once for a count of five. Snell recovered and decked Morgan in the fourth with a strong blow behind the ear. He dropped Morgan again briefly in that round and then continued in the fifth and sixth with a decided advantage as Morgan still appeared groggy. Snell may have come close to a knockout at several points in the final two rounds.

Morgan would meet Gorman again on October 21 of that year for a fairly easy decision in six rounds in Seattle. On June 10, 1925, Morgan would defeat Gorman again in Oakland in an easy ten round points decision. Gorman was knocked to the mat in the first, and was not a major threat in the following rounds.

== Taking the World Jr. Lightweight Title from Mike Ballerino, December 1925 ==
Morgan took the World Jr. Lightweight Title on December 2, 1925, in a ten-round technical knockout against Mike Ballerino at Olympic Auditorium in Los, Angeles. Though putting up a typically aggressive and tireless display, the Lincoln Star wrote that Ballerino only won the first round decisively. He was down for a nine count in the third round, outpunched badly against the ropes in the sixth, and had the crowd shouting to end the bout by the ninth and tenth rounds. The Associated Press wrote that Ballerino's seconds had his manager Frank Churchill throw in the towel, though they already knew Morgan had clinched the bout on points.

=== Defeating former World Junior Lightweight Champion Steve Sullivan, June 1926 ===
On June 3, 1926, Morgan fought Steve "Kid" Sullivan, a former World Junior Lightweight Champion, at the Brooklyn National League Baseball Park in front of 40,000 enthralled boxing fans. Morgan convincingly beat Sullivan in a sixth round Technical Knockout. The Oakland Tribune wrote Morgan dealt Sullivan "one of the worst beatings a battler ever received in an Eastern Ring" The Wilkes-Barre Evening News, wrote "Tod Morgan... was not in the slightest danger of losing the world's junior lightweight championship while fighting Steve Kid Sullivan at Ebbets Field last night". Sullivan was down for the count of nine in both the first and second rounds. In the sixth round, Sullivan's handlers tossed in the towel. Sullivan's most apparent injuries were cuts to his nose.

=== Defense of the Jr. Lightweight Title, Joe Glick, September 1926 ===
On September 30, 1926, Morgan defeated Jewish boxer Joe Glick in a fifteen-round Jr. Lightweight Championship bout at Madison Square Garden. The Associated Press gave Morgan eleven rounds, with three even, and only one to Glick. The A. P. wrote that Morgan put on "one of the nicest exhibitions of boxing put on at the Garden in some time."

=== Defense of the Jr. Lightweight Title, Johnny Dundee, October 1926 ===
On October 19, 1926, Morgan defeated Johnny Dundee before 14,0000 spectators in a World Jr. Lightweight Title match in a ten-round points decision at Recreation Park in San Francisco. Morgan was considered to have taken six of the ten rounds against the veteran Dundee. Dundee, eleven years older than Morgan, may have injured his hand in the third round, and by the eighth was in a decided disadvantage.

=== Defense of the Jr. Lightweight Title, Carl Duane, November 1926 ===
On November 19, 1926, Morgan defeated Carl Duane in a close match at Madison Square Garden in New York that drew 14,260 fans. The referees and judges scored a fifteen-round unanimous decision for Morgan, but the bout had its close rounds. Morgan said referring to Duane, that "he gave me the hardest fight I've had since I won the title." Morgan was bruised notably after the bout. Morgan was injured by hooks to his face most notably in the thirteenth and fourteenth rounds, but Morgan scored frequently with blows to the head of Duane throughout the bout, and his defense seemed somewhat more effective. Duane took considerable punishment in the final round but managed to fight the bout without once being knocked to the mat. Morgan fought at 127 1/2 pounds.

=== Defense of the Jr. Lightweight Title, Vic Foley, May 1927 ===
On May 28, 1927, Morgan defended his Jr. Lightweight Title again against Vic Foley in a twelve-round points decision in Vancouver, Canada. Morgan had taken six months off from active boxing prior to the bout, but was well matched with Foley, who gave him no major trouble in the bout. Morgan twice dropped Foley with two-fisted attacks. The majority of ringside critics gave eight rounds to Morgan with two even, and two to Foley. Foley was down for a count of eight in the second and more briefly in the fifth. Foley made his best stand in the fourth when he sent Morgan to the ropes.

==== Frank Churchill becomes sole boxing manager ====
After Fred Morgan, Tod's acting manager died in a boating accident around August 1927, Tod adopted Billie, his stepfather's four-year-old son, on February 15, 1929. Frank Churchill, who had managed Mike Ballerino, a Jr. Lightweight Champion, and Filipino Flyweight Champion Pancho Villa became Morgan's sole manager.

=== Difficult defense of the Jr. Lightweight Title, Joe Glick, December 1927 ===
In a Super Featherweight title fight that was recognized by both the NBA and the New York State Athletic Commission (NYSAC), Morgan defeated New York Jewish boxer Joe Glick in a fourteenth round disqualification before 10,000 spectators at New York's Madison Square Garden on December 16, 1927. Glick, who was a solid opponent, dropped Morgan for nine counts once in the second and twice in the fifth, and may have won the bout had he not been disqualified for a low left to the groin in the fourteenth by referee Eddie Forbes. Morgan was hurt by loops to the head, often to the jaw, and digs to the body at several points in the bout. Glick began the first with a strong and effective attack against Morgan. Glick was first warned of a low blow in the third round, and had lost previous fights to low blows. Frank Getty of the Arizona Republic believed Glick may have hit below the belt on six occasions, but this was far from the opinion of the writer for the Brooklyn Daily Eagle, who believed Glick had actually hit below the belt on only a few occasions. Getty of the Republic also wrote Glick may have head-butted once or twice in the bout, another clear foul.

=== Two World Jr. Lightweight Title Defenses with Eddie Martin, May, July 1928 ===
In May and July 1928, Morgan defeated talented "Cannonball" Eddie Martin, former World Bantamweight Champion, in two World Jr. Lightweight Title Defenses at Madison Square Garden and Ebbets Field in Brooklyn. Morgan won both bouts in two fifteen round points decisions, but the fighting was fierce, particularly in their second bout.

In their brutal July bout, the Associated Press gave Morgan eight of the fifteen rounds, and Martin only four, with three even. The fighting was close throughout the contest. Morgan received a gash from a head butt in the first round, while Morgan cut Martin's right cheek in the third. In the tenth, Martin's right eyebrow was cut deeply. Morgan also had a large knot above his right eye, a bloodly nose, and a cut behind his right ear.

=== Two World Jr. Lightweight Title Defenses with Santiago Zorilla, December 1928, April 1929 ===
Morgan fought a ten-round draw with Panamanian Santiago Zorrilla on December 3, 1928, before 15,000, at the State Armory in San Francisco. Morgan scored frequently with rights to the face of his opponent, and in the tenth briefly sent Zorrilla to the mat, but he received a badly swollen eye in the ninth. Zorrilla may not have been of the caliber of many of Morgan's previous title opponents. Morgan was able to defend adequately against the more frequent blows of Zorilla.

On April 4, 1929, in another World Jr. Lightweight Title Match, Morgan won a ten-round points decision against Zorrilla before a capacity crowd at the Olympic Auditorium in Los Angeles. The bout had no knockdowns, and was fast, without either boxer taking a decided edge for long, though both boxers received and dealt a number of effective blows. The bout was refereed by navy Lieutenant Jack Kennedy, a common referee of Naval bouts and a close associate of both "Abe the Newsboy" Hollandersky and Jack Dempsey. Kennedy announced the winner of each round, giving four to Morgan, only one to Zorilla, with five tied. Zorrilla had a decided disadvantage in both reach and height, having a six-inch height disadvantage over the 5' 7 1/2" Morgan. His shorter reach may have accounted for Zorrilla's difficulty in landing many telling blows against the defense of Morgan. Morgan fought Zorrilla twice more in 1930, receiving a win and another draw.

On May 12, 1931, Morgan lost to Cecil Payne at the Olympic Auditorium in Los Angeles. Payne injured Morgan's right eye in the first which affected Morgan's vision throughout the bout, and the eye was nearly closed by the third round. Morgan was down briefly for a count of one in the seventh from a staggering left to the chin, but the boxing was close in some respects through the bout. Morgan may have been affected by a wrenched shoulder he had suffered around mid-April which had forced him to delay this bout with Payne. Payne took six of the ten rounds.

=== Last defense of the Jr. Lightweight Title, Sal Sorio, May 1929 ===
In his final World Jr. Lightweight Title match, on May 20, 1929, Morgan defeated "Baby" Sal Sorio at Wrigley Field in Los Angeles in a ten-round points decision. Though Sorio had been a highly effective knockout boxer, Morgan staged an effective defense taking eight of the ten rounds for a decision. As he had in other bouts, Morgan's long left made it frequently to the head and body of Sorio, holding off his attack. Sol had the champion in distress, however in both the third and eighth rounds. Morgan was down briefly in the third, and in the eighth punished Morgan with three of his signature short right jabs. Morgan, however used his superior ring experience and longer reach to gain the victory. On June 14, 1932, Morgan decisively defeated Carter in a seventh-round technical knockout at the Arcade Auditorium in Vancouver, Canada. It was a brutal defeat for Carter, and he was unable to continue in the seventh.

On July 9, 1928, Goldie Hess defeated Morgan, at the Olympic Auditorium in Los Angeles in a convincing ten round non-title points decision, though the scoring was only six rounds for Hess.

Fighting as a lightweight at 136 1/2 pounds on August 14, 1930, Morgan defeated black boxer Leslie "Wildcat" Carter at the Civic Auditorium in Seattle, Washington in a six-round points decision. After the first round, Morgan opened up with his characteristic left jab, and right crosses, hitting Carter repeatedly in the last five rounds. At 134 pounds, he had drawn with Carter on September 3, 1928, at the Arena in Vancouver, British Columbia.

At 136 1/4, on July 1, 1931, Morgan again defeated Goldie Hess at the Civic Ice Arena in Seattle in an 8-round points decision. In the feature non-title bout, Morgan characteristically used his highly effective left against Hess, often with blows to Hess's face. Morgan won the bout on points by a comfortable margin.

On August 19, 1931, Morgan defeated Frankie Stetson at the Auditorium in Oakland, California in a ten-round points decision. Stetson was down for a count of nine in the first from a left swing by Morgan. By the seventh, Stetson was cut by a shot to the right eye from Morgan. The referee gave eight of the ten rounds to Morgan with only two to Stetson.

On September 3, 1931, Morgan defeated Cecil Payne in a ten-round points decision in Sacramento, California. Morgan appeared to be the aggressor through all but three rounds, though Payne was effective in the third round.

Fighting at 137 3/4 on September 22, 1931, Morgan defeated Eddie Thomas at the Armory in Portland, Oregon, in a ten-round points decision. In the fourth round, Thomas was down for a count of eight from a left hook to the chin from Morgan.

==== Other bouts with Sal Sorio, 1932 ====
Morgan fought Sorio on two other occasions, on February 17, 1932, winning in a ten-round points decision in Sorio's home turf of San Bernardino and on August 19, 1932, at Legion Stadium in Hollywood, winning in an eighth round disqualification. In their February 17 bout, before a crowd of 900, Morgan piled up a commanding lead in points in each of the ten rounds. In the fourth and seventh Sorio attempted to rally, but his blows did not connect effectively against the defense of Morgan. Morgan effectively countered the left hook of Sorio to the body, which was an important blow in Sorio's offensive strategy.

In their August 19 bout, Sorio seemed to have been losing the bout, having been dropped twice to the mat in the sixth round, once for a count of nine. In the eighth, Sorio landed a particularly "offensive punch" below the belt to Morgan and the referee ended the bout, though he had been warned about low blows in the previous round.

== Losing the World Jr. Lightweight Title to Benny Bass, December 1929 ==
Morgan lost the belt on December 20, 1929, when he was KO'd by Benny Bass in the second of fifteen rounds at Madison Square Garden. By this time the division was usually referenced as the Super Featherweight Title, though the weight range was nearly identical to Jr. Lightweight. Bass was the former 1927 NBA World Featherweight Champion, and an important opponent. The first round of their December bout appeared to be clearly taken by Morgan. The reigning champion connected with two blows to the chin of Bass that seemed to stagger him. Unexpectedly, in the opening of the second, Bass became the aggressor with their first close flurry of blows causing Morgan to drop to the canvas for a count of nine after a strong right to the jaw. Morgan was up only to have Bass follow him around the ring aggressively and land two more strong rights to the jaw which landed Morgan on the mat again. Morgan attempted, but was unable to rise fully before sinking again to the mat. Both of Morgan's drops to the mat occurred in less than a minute into the second round. The bout was exceptional for such a sudden and abrupt turn of events. An investigation was held after the bout on suspicion of a fixed bout, as some believed the betting was 4 to 1 for Bass before the fight, but the ruling held. Davis J. Walsh of the Times Herald, felt strongly that the fight was not fixed.

On July 23, 1930, Morgan defeated Don Fraser at Natatorium Park before a crowd of 6,000 in a six-round points decision in Spokane, Washington. Jack Dempsey, a California resident at the time, refereed the bout.

=== Bouts with Eddie Mack ===
On August 28, 1930, Morgan defeated Eddie Mack for the only time in Seattle in a six-round unanimous decision. In a previous match on November 26, 1929, shortly before losing the World Jr. Lightweight Title, Morgan had lost to Mack in a ten-round points decision. On April 23, 1927, in a split decision, the referees called their ten-round bout at Civic Auditorium in Denver a draw. Mack was a tall lightweight from Denver, and Morgan may not have matched up well with a boxer an inch and a half taller who had boxed primarily as a lightweight.

== Taking the USA California Lightweight Championship, March 1931 ==
On March 24, 1931, Morgan defeated Goldie Hess at the Olympic Auditorium in Los Angeles, in a ten-round points decision taking the USA California State Lightweight Championship. In a convincing victory, Morgan was given seven of the ten rounds with two to Hess and one even. Morgan was the aggressor, scoring points in every round effectively utilizing both rights and lefts. Morgan's greatest advantage was in the seventh when he scored with blows to the head of Hess. He was awarded the State Championship belt by actress Joan Blondell.

=== Win over former World Lightweight Champion Sammy Mandell, July 1932 ===
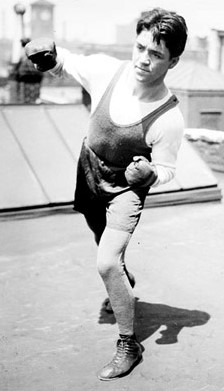
Joe Glick

On July 8, 1932, Morgan defeated 1926 World Lightweight Champion Sammy Mandell at Legion Stadium in Hollywood California. Mandell was making a comeback and Morgan reportedly won the decision without trouble, though the bout was slow and deliberate. Morgan had the best of the match in the second and seventh, and concentrated on Mandell's body.

== Move to Australia, 1933, and service in WWII ==
In 1933, Morgan moved to Australia, where he lived and boxed until his retirement from boxing in 1942.

=== Boxing in Honolulu, Hawaii, December 1935 ===
On December 10, 1935, Morgan fought Kid Moro in Honolulu in a bout that was billed as the Welterweight Championship of Hawaii. He won the bout in a ten-round points decision. The Oakland Tribune put the date for this fight as November 15, however, and reported that Moro had accumulated enough points to take the bout.

== Taking the Australian Lightweight Title, March 1938 ==
On March 12, 1938, Morgan first took the Australian Lightweight Title in a fourth-round knockout against Jimmy Dundee at Newcastle Stadium in Sydney, Australia. He impressively held the title until July 3, 1941, losing in a fifteen-round points decision against Vic Patrick that was quite unpopular with the crowd. He would lose twice more to Patrick in Sydney shortly before his retirement from boxing.

Morgan's last bout was on July 18, 1942, when he defeated Llew Edwards in a ten-round points decision in Melbourne, Australia.

By May 1943, Morgan was serving in the Australian Army where he reached the rank of Sergeant. He worked as a boxing instructor at American Army camps in Australia.

== Return to America after WWII ==
On his return from Australia in the 1940s, Morgan worked as a bellboy and boxing referee in Seattle.

After a lengthy illness, he died in Seattle, Washington, on August 3, 1953, at the age of 50. He was survived by his wife, Grace, her son, Bill, whom he had adopted, and his mother.

== Professional boxing record ==
All information in this section is derived from BoxRec, unless otherwise stated.

=== Official record ===
218 fights	133 wins	42 losses
By knockout	29	4
By decision	97	37
By disqualification	7	1
Draws	33	
No contests	2	
Newspaper decisions/draws	8	

All newspaper decisions are officially regarded as “no decision” bouts and are not counted in the win/loss/draw column.

No.	Result	Record	Opponent	Type	Round, time	Date	Location	Notes
218	Win	133–42–33 (10)	Young Llew Edwards	PTS	12	Jul 18, 1942	West Melbourne Stadium, Melbourne, Australia	
217	Loss	132–42–33 (10)	Vic Patrick	TKO	11 (12), 1:40	Mar 9, 1942	Sydney Stadium, Sydney, Australia	Police intervened
216	Loss	132–41–33 (10)	Vic Patrick	PTS	15	Sep 11, 1941	Sydney Stadium, Sydney, Australia	
215	Loss	132–40–33 (10)	Vic Patrick	PTS	15	Jul 3, 1941	Sydney Stadium, Sydney, Australia	Lost Australian lightweight title
214	Win	132–39–33 (10)	Vic Patrick	DQ	5 (12)	Jun 5, 1941	Sydney Stadium, Sydney, Australia	
213	Win	131–39–33 (10)	Ron McLaughlin	PTS	12	Mar 15, 1941	West Melbourne Stadium, Melbourne, Australia	
212	Loss	130–39–33 (10)	Alan Westbury	PTS	15	Feb 8, 1941	Greater Newcastle Stadium, Newcastle, Australia	
211	Win	130–38–33 (10)	Alan Westbury	PTS	12	Feb 1, 1941	Greater Newcastle Stadium, Newcastle, Australia	
210	Draw	129–38–33 (10)	Ron McLaughlin	PTS	12	Jan 18, 1941	Greater Newcastle Stadium, Newcastle, Australia	
209	Win	129–38–32 (10)	Joe Hall	DQ	11 (15)	Dec 26, 1940	North Sydney Oval, Sydney, Australia	Retained Australian lightweight title
208	Win	128–38–32 (10)	Tiger Charley Parks	DQ	3 (12)	Dec 14, 1940	Broken Hill Stadium, Broken Hill, Australia	
207	Win	127–38–32 (10)	Len Fay	PTS	12	Nov 25, 1940	Grenfell Street Stadium, Adelaide, Australia	
206	Win	126–38–32 (10)	Tiger Charley Parks	TKO	4 (15)	Oct 29, 1940	Town Hall, Kalgoorlie, Australia	
205	Win	125–38–32 (10)	Johnny Hutchinson	PTS	12	Apr 24, 1940	West Melbourne Stadium, Melbourne, Australia	
204	Loss	124–38–32 (10)	Clever Henry	PTS	12	Apr 13, 1940	West Melbourne Stadium, Melbourne, Australia	
203	Win	124–37–32 (10)	Fighting Carlos	TKO	12 (12)	Mar 26, 1940	Sydney Stadium, Sydney, Australia	
202	Win	123–37–32 (10)	Herb Bishop	PTS	12	Feb 23, 1940	W.A.C.A. Grounds, Perth, Australia	
201	Win	122–37–32 (10)	Claude Varner	TKO	7 (12)	Feb 15, 1940	W.A.C.A. Grounds, Perth, Australia	Retained Australian lightweight title
200	Win	121–37–32 (10)	Claude Varner	PTS	12	Jan 26, 1940	W.A.C.A. Grounds, Perth, Australia	
199	Win	120–37–32 (10)	Paddy Boxall	RTD	3 (15)	Dec 26, 1939	Hollywood Stadium, Perth, Australia	Won Australian lightweight title
198	Win	119–37–32 (10)	Danny LaVerne	PTS	12	Nov 10, 1939	Hollywood Stadium, Perth, Australia	
197	Loss	118–37–32 (10)	Danny LaVerne	PTS	12	Oct 6, 1939	Hollywood Stadium, Perth, Australia	
196	Loss	118–36–32 (10)	Paddy Boxall	PTS	15	Jun 30, 1939	Hollywood Stadium, Perth, Australia	Lost Australian lightweight title
195	Draw	118–35–32 (10)	Johnny Hutchinson	PTS	12	May 12, 1939	Brisbane Stadium, Brisbane, Australia	
194	Win	118–35–31 (10)	Graham Evans	RTD	10 (15)	Feb 24, 1939	Unity Theatre, Perth, Australia	
193	Win	117–35–31 (10)	Herb Bishop	PTS	15	Dec 26, 1938	Hollywood Theatre, Perth, Australia	
192	Win	116–35–31 (10)	Bob King	KO	6 (15)	Dec 9, 1938	Hollywood Theatre, Perth, Australia	
191	Loss	115–35–31 (10)	Herb Bishop	PTS	12	Sep 12, 1938	Town Hall, Kalgoorlie, Australia	
190	Win	115–34–31 (10)	Mickey Leonard	TKO	8 (12)	Jul 22, 1938	Unity Stadium, Perth, Australia	
189	Win	114–34–31 (10)	Herb Bishop	PTS	12	Jul 7, 1938	Town Hall, Kalgoorlie, Australia	
188	Win	113–34–31 (10)	Ron McLaughlin	KO	10 (12)	May 11, 1938	Leichhardt Stadium, Sydney, Australia	
187	Win	112–34–31 (10)	Jimmy Dundee	RTD	6 (12)	Apr 29, 1938	Lithgow Stadium, Lithgow, Australia	
186	Win	111–34–31 (10)	Jimmy Dundee	KO	6 (15)	Mar 12, 1938	Newcastle Stadium, Newcastle, Australia	Won Australian lightweight title
185	Win	110–34–31 (10)	Manuel Cuzzulini	TKO	4 (12)	Mar 5, 1938	Newcastle Stadium, Newcastle, Australia	
184	Win	109–34–31 (10)	Herb Bishop	PTS	12	Oct 5, 1937	Leichhardt Stadium, Sydney, Australia	
183	Win	108–34–31 (10)	Jimmy Dundee	KO	4 (12)	Sep 21, 1937	Leichhardt Stadium, Sydney, Australia	
182	Win	107–34–31 (10)	Clever Henry	PTS	15	Jun 30, 1937	Leichhardt Stadium, Sydney, Australia	
181	Win	106–34–31 (10)	Bert Osborne	PTS	15	Jun 9, 1937	Leichhardt Stadium, Sydney, Australia	
180	Win	105–34–31 (10)	Herb Bishop	PTS	15	May 19, 1937	Leichhardt Stadium, Sydney, Australia	
179	Win	104–34–31 (10)	Sid Clarke	KO	5 (15)	Apr 23, 1937	Agricultural Hall, Wollongong, Australia	
178	Win	103–34–31 (10)	Mickey Leonard	KO	2 (15)	Mar 20, 1937	Broken Hill Stadium, Broken Hill, Australia	
177	Loss	102–34–31 (10)	Saverio Turiello	PTS	15	Feb 3, 1936	Sydney Stadium, Sydney, Australia	
176	Loss	102–33–31 (10)	Kid Moro	PTS	10	Nov 15, 1935	Civic Auditorium, Honolulu, Hawaii	
175	Loss	102–32–31 (10)	Gordon Wallace	PTS	10	May 8, 1935	Denman Auditorium, Vancouver, British Columbia, Canada	
174	Loss	102–31–31 (10)	Willard Brown	PTS	15	Feb 4, 1935	Sydney Stadium, Sydney, Australia	
173	Win	102–30–31 (10)	Reg Hickey	KO	8 (15)	Dec 10, 1934	Sydney Stadium, Sydney, Australia	
172	Loss	101–30–31 (10)	Jack Portney	PTS	15	Dec 3, 1934	Sydney Stadium, Sydney, Australia	
171	Draw	101–29–31 (10)	Jack Portney	PTS	15	Nov 12, 1934	Sydney Stadium, Sydney, Australia	
170	Loss	101–29–30 (10)	Herb Bishop	PTS	10	Nov 5, 1934	Sydney Stadium, Sydney, Australia	
169	NC	101–28–30 (10)	Herb Bishop	NC	5 (15)	Oct 15, 1934	Sydney Stadium, Sydney, Australia	non contest as both boxers were "unusually cautious"
168	Loss	101–28–30 (9)	Jack Carroll	PTS	15	Aug 27, 1934	Sydney Stadium, Sydney, Australia	
167	Draw	101–27–30 (9)	Reg Hickey	PTS	15	Aug 8, 1934	Brisbane Stadium, Brisbane, Australia	
166	Win	101–27–29 (9)	Herb Bishop	PTS	15	Jul 30, 1934	Sydney Stadium, Sydney, Australia	
165	Win	100–27–29 (9)	Tommy Johns	KO	1 (15), 2:30	Jul 16, 1934	Sydney Stadium, Sydney, Australia	
164	Win	99–27–29 (9)	Jimmy Kelso	KO	8 (15), 2:20	Jul 2, 1934	Sydney Stadium, Sydney, Australia	
163	Loss	98–27–29 (9)	Joe Ghnouly	PTS	15	Apr 30, 1934	Sydney Stadium, Sydney, Australia	
162	Draw	98–26–29 (9)	Jimmy Kelso	PTS	15	Nov 20, 1933	Sydney Stadium, Sydney, Australia	
161	Win	98–26–28 (9)	Jimmy Kelso	PTS	15	Nov 11, 1933	West Melbourne Stadium, Melbourne, Australia	
160	Loss	97–26–28 (9)	Jimmy Kelso	PTS	15	Oct 30, 1933	Sydney Stadium, Sydney, Australia	
159	Loss	97–25–28 (9)	Jack Carroll	PTS	15	Oct 9, 1933	Sydney Stadium, Sydney, Australia	
158	Draw	97–24–28 (9)	Nel Tarleton	PTS	15	Sep 25, 1933	Sydney Stadium, Sydney, Australia	
157	Win	97–24–27 (9)	Bobby Blay	PTS	15	Sep 4, 1933	Sydney Stadium, Sydney, Australia	Not to be confused with Bobby Flay
156	Win	96–24–27 (9)	Leo Dardeen	KO	6 (10)	Jul 13, 1933	Arena, White Center, Washington, US	
155	Win	95–24–27 (9)	Victor Kid Ponce	KO	2 (15)	May 30, 1933	Arcade Auditorium, Vancouver, British Columbia, Canada	
154	Win	94–24–27 (9)	Pastor Calope	PTS	6	May 15, 1933	Auditorium, Wenatchee, Washington, US	
153	Win	93–24–27 (9)	Eddie Santry	PTS	6	May 5, 1933	Elks Club, Bremerton, Washington, US	
152	Win	92–24–27 (9)	Pastor Calope	PTS	6	May 3, 1933	Eagles Hall, Yakima, Washington, US	
151	Win	91–24–27 (9)	Albie Davies	PTS	8	Apr 25, 1933	Arcade Auditorium, Vancouver, British Columbia, Canada	
150	Win	90–24–27 (9)	Pastor Calope	PTS	6	Apr 7, 1933	Elks Club, Bremerton, Washington, US	
149	Win	89–24–27 (9)	Pastor Calope	PTS	6	Mar 29, 1933	Labor Temple, Everett, Washington, US	
148	Draw	88–24–27 (9)	Albie Davies	MD	15	Mar 4, 1933	Pacific Stadium, Victoria, British Columbia, Canada	
147	Loss	88–24–26 (9)	Alvin Lewis	PTS	6	Dec 20, 1932	Crystal Pool, Seattle, Washington, US	
146	Draw	88–23–26 (9)	Henry Woods	MD	6	Dec 6, 1932	Crystal Pool, Seattle, Washington, US	
145	Win	88–23–25 (9)	Albie Davies	PTS	10	Dec 1, 1932	Pacific Stadium, Victoria, British Columbia, Canada	
144	Draw	87–23–25 (9)	Albie Davies	PTS	6	Nov 8, 1932	Arcade Auditorium, Vancouver, British Columbia, Canada	
143	Loss	87–23–24 (9)	Kenny LaSalle	PTS	10	Sep 9, 1932	Legion Stadium, Hollywood, California, US	
142	Win	87–22–24 (9)	Baby Sal Sorio	DQ	8 (10)	Aug 19, 1932	Legion Stadium, Hollywood, California, US	
141	Win	86–22–24 (9)	Sammy Mandell	PTS	10	Jul 8, 1932	Legion Stadium, Hollywood, California, US	
140	Loss	85–22–24 (9)	Don Fraser	SD	6	Jun 23, 1932	Arena, Dishman, Washington, US	
139	Win	85–21–24 (9)	Leslie 'Wildcat' Carter	TKO	7 (8)	Jun 14, 1932	Arcade Auditorium, Vancouver, British Columbia, Canada	
138	Loss	84–21–24 (9)	Mushy Callahan	PTS	10	May 6, 1932	Legion Stadium, Hollywood, California, US	
137	Win	84–20–24 (9)	Johnny Albin	TKO	8 (10)	Mar 3, 1932	Orange Belt A.C., San Bernardino, California, US	
136	Win	83–20–24 (9)	Baby Sal Sorio	PTS	10	Feb 17, 1932	Orange Belt A.C., San Bernardino, California, US	
135	Loss	82–20–24 (9)	Don Fraser	PTS	6	Jan 21, 1932	Greenwich Coliseum, Tacoma, Washington, US	
134	Win	82–19–24 (9)	Eddie Volk	PTS	6	Jan 1, 1932	Auditorium, Portland, Oregon, US	
133	Loss	81–19–24 (9)	Bobby Pacho	TKO	7 (10), 1:47	Nov 10, 1931	Olympic Auditorium, Los Angeles, California, US	
132	Win	81–18–24 (9)	Sammy Santos	UD	8	Oct 14, 1931	Civic Ice Arena, Seattle, Washington, US	
131	ND	80–18–24 (9)	Paddy Sullivan	ND	4	Oct 8, 1931	Port Angeles, Washington, US	
130	Win	80–18–24 (8)	Sammy Santos	PTS	10	Sep 30, 1931	Civic Ice Arena, Seattle, Washington, US	
129	Win	79–18–24 (8)	Eddie Thomas	PTS	10	Sep 22, 1931	Armory, Portland, Oregon, US	
128	Win	78–18–24 (8)	Cecil Payne	PTS	10	Sep 3, 1931	Memorial Auditorium, Sacramento, California, US	
127	Win	77–18–24 (8)	Frankie Stetson	PTS	10	Aug 19, 1931	Auditorium, Oakland, California, US	
126	Loss	76–18–24 (8)	Bobby Pacho	PTS	10	Aug 11, 1931	Olympic Auditorium, Los Angeles, California, US	Lost USA California State lightweight title
125	Win	76–17–24 (8)	Goldie Hess	PTS	8	Jul 1, 1931	Civic Ice Arena, Seattle, Washington, US	
124	Loss	75–17–24 (8)	Cecil Payne	PTS	10	May 12, 1931	Olympic Auditorium, Los Angeles, California, US	
123	Win	75–16–24 (8)	Ramon Ortega	KO	2 (4)	Apr 10, 1931	Dreamland Auditorium, San Francisco, California, US	
122	Win	74–16–24 (8)	Goldie Hess	PTS	10	Mar 24, 1931	Olympic Auditorium, Los Angeles, California, US	Won USA California State lightweight title
121	Loss	73–16–24 (8)	Billy Townsend	PTS	10	Feb 17, 1931	Olympic Auditorium, Los Angeles, California, US	
120	Win	73–15–24 (8)	Battling Siki	PTS	10	Jan 16, 1931	Phoenix, Arizona, US	
119	Win	72–15–24 (8)	Hector McDonald	PTS	10	Oct 21, 1930	Olympic Auditorium, Los Angeles, California, US	
118	Win	71–15–24 (8)	Santiago Zorrilla	PTS	8	Sep 23, 1930	Civic Ice Arena, Seattle, Washington, US	
117	Win	70–15–24 (8)	Eddie Mack	PTS	6	Aug 28, 1930	Civic Ice Arena, Seattle, Washington, US	
116	Win	69–15–24 (8)	Leslie 'Wildcat' Carter	PTS	6	Aug 14, 1930	Civic Auditorium, Seattle, Washington, US	
115	Win	68–15–24 (8)	Joey Coffman	PTS	6	Jul 25, 1930	Greenwich Coliseum, Tacoma, Washington, US	
114	Win	67–15–24 (8)	Don Fraser	PTS	6	Jul 23, 1930	Natatorium Park, Spokane, Washington, US	
113	Draw	66–15–24 (8)	Santiago Zorrilla	SD	15	Jun 6, 1930	Arena, Vancouver, British Columbia, Canada	
112	Loss	66–15–23 (8)	Benny Bass	KO	2 (15), 0:51	Dec 20, 1929	Madison Square Garden, New York City, New York, US	Lost NYSAC, NBA, and The Ring super featherweight titles
111	Loss	66–14–23 (8)	Eddie Mack	PTS	10	Nov 26, 1929	Olympic Auditorium, Los Angeles, California, US	
110	Draw	66–13–23 (8)	Billy Townsend	PTS	10	Nov 1, 1929	Arena, Vancouver, British Columbia, Canada	
109	Loss	66–13–22 (8)	Goldie Hess	PTS	10	Jul 9, 1929	Olympic Auditorium, Los Angeles, California, US	
108	Win	66–12–22 (8)	Baby Sal Sorio	PTS	10	May 20, 1929	Wrigley Field, Los Angeles, California, US	Retained NYSAC, NBA, and The Ring super featherweight titles
107	Draw	65–12–22 (8)	Eddie Mack	SD	10	Apr 23, 1929	City Auditorium, Denver, Colorado, US	
106	Win	65–12–21 (8)	Santiago Zorrilla	UD	10	Apr 4, 1929	Olympic Auditorium, Los Angeles, California, US	Retained NYSAC, NBA, and The Ring super featherweight titles
105	Loss	64–12–21 (8)	Eddie Mack	UD	10	Jan 8, 1929	City Auditorium, Denver, Colorado, US	
104	Loss	64–11–21 (8)	Joey Sangor	NWS	10	Jan 1, 1929	State Armory, San Francisco, California, US	NYSAC, NBA, and The Ring super featherweight titles at stake; (via KO only)
103	Draw	64–11–21 (7)	Santiago Zorrilla	PTS	10	Dec 3, 1928	State Armory, San Francisco, California, US	Retained NYSAC, NBA, and The Ring super featherweight titles
102	Loss	64–11–20 (7)	King Tut	NWS	10	Oct 2, 1928	Auditorium, Minneapolis, Minnesota, US	
101	Draw	64–11–20 (6)	Leslie 'Wildcat' Carter	PTS	10	Sep 3, 1928	Arena, Vancouver, British Columbia, Canada	
100	Win	64–11–19 (6)	Eddie Martin	PTS	15	Jul 18, 1928	Ebbets Field, New York City, New York, US	Retained NYSAC, NBA, and The Ring super featherweight titles
99	Win	63–11–19 (6)	Eddie Martin	PTS	15	May 24, 1928	Madison Square Garden, New York City, New York, US	Retained NYSAC, NBA, and The Ring super featherweight titles
98	Loss	62–11–19 (6)	Jack Duffy	NWS	10	Apr 3, 1928	Armory, Toledo, Ohio, US	
97	Win	62–11–19 (5)	Ritchie King	PTS	10	Feb 24, 1928	Arena, Vancouver, British Columbia, Canada	
96	Win	61–11–19 (5)	Joe Glick	DQ	14 (15), 2:09	Dec 16, 1927	Madison Square Garden, New York City, New York, US	Retained NYSAC, NBA, and The Ring super featherweight titles; Glick was DQ'd for a low blow which knocked Morgan down
95	Loss	60–11–19 (5)	Dick Finnegan	PTS	10	Dec 2, 1927	Mechanics Building, Boston, Massachusetts, US	
94	Loss	60–10–19 (5)	Stanislaus Loayza	DQ	9 (10)	Sep 20, 1927	Coliseum, Chicago, Illinois, US	
93	Loss	60–9–19 (5)	Doc Snell	PTS	6	Jun 28, 1927	Dugdale Park, Seattle, Washington, US	
92	Win	60–8–19 (5)	Vic Foley	PTS	12	May 28, 1927	Arena, Vancouver, British Columbia, Canada	Retained NYSAC and The Ring super featherweight titles
91	Loss	59–8–19 (5)	Phil McGraw	MD	10	Jan 7, 1927	Madison Square Garden, New York City, New York, US	
90	Win	59–7–19 (5)	Carl Duane	UD	15	Nov 19, 1926	Madison Square Garden, New York City, New York, US	Retained NYSAC and The Ring super featherweight titles
89	Win	58–7–19 (5)	Johnny Dundee	PTS	10	Oct 19, 1926	Recreation Park, San Francisco, California, US	Retained NYSAC and The Ring super featherweight titles
88	Win	57–7–19 (5)	Joe Glick	PTS	15	Sep 30, 1926	Madison Square Garden, New York City, New York, US	Retained NYSAC and The Ring super featherweight titles
87	Loss	56–7–19 (5)	Tommy O'Brien	PTS	10	Aug 4, 1926	Olympic Auditorium, Los Angeles, California, US	
86	Win	56–6–19 (5)	Johnny Kochansky	NWS	10	Jul 9, 1926	Boyle's Thirty Acres, Jersey City, New Jersey, US	
85	Win	56–6–19 (4)	Ted Blatt	NWS	10	Jul 5, 1926	Olympic Arena, New York City, New York, US	
84	Loss	56–6–19 (3)	Babe Herman	UD	10	Jun 24, 1926	Cycle Track, Revere, Massachusetts, US	
83	Win	56–5–19 (3)	Steve Sullivan	TKO	6 (15)	Jun 3, 1926	Ebbets Field, New York City, New York, US	Retained NYSAC and The Ring super featherweight titles
82	Win	55–5–19 (3)	Eddie Brady	NWS	12	Mar 29, 1926	Rayen-Wood Auditorium, Youngstown, Ohio, US	
81	Draw	55–5–19 (2)	Charlie O'Connell	PTS	12	Mar 17, 1926	Public Hall, Cleveland, Ohio, US	
80	Win	55–5–18 (2)	Don Davis	NWS	10	Feb 26, 1926	East Chicago, Indiana, US	
79	Win	55–5–18 (1)	Jimmy Goodrich	NWS	10	Feb 22, 1926	Auditorium, Milwaukee, Wisconsin, US	
78	Win	55–5–18	Stewart McLean	PTS	10	Jan 13, 1926	Auditorium, Oakland, California, US	
77	Win	54–5–18	Sammy Compagno	TKO	7 (10)	Jan 7, 1926	Armory, Portland, Oregon, US	
76	Win	53–5–18	Mike Ballerino	TKO	10 (10)	Dec 2, 1925	Olympic Auditorium, Los Angeles, California, US	Won NYSAC and The Ring super featherweight titles
75	Win	52–5–18	Harry Wallach	PTS	10	Sep 9, 1925	Olympic Auditorium, Los Angeles, California, US	Retained Pacific Coast featherweight title
74	Win	51–5–18	Stewart McLean	PTS	10	Jun 19, 1925	Legion Stadium, Hollywood, California, US	
73	Win	50–5–18	Joe Gorman	PTS	10	Jun 10, 1925	Auditorium, Oakland, California, US	
72	Draw	49–5–18	Stewart McLean	PTS	10	Apr 22, 1925	Auditorium, Oakland, California, US	
71	Win	49–5–17	Gene Delmont	PTS	10	Mar 13, 1925	Legion Stadium, Hollywood, California, US	
70	Win	48–5–17	Doc Snell	PTS	6	Dec 30, 1924	Crystal Pool, Seattle, Washington, US	
69	Draw	47–5–17	Doc Snell	PTS	6	Dec 18, 1924	Glide Rink, Tacoma, Washington, US	
68	Win	47–5–16	Ad Mackie	UD	6	Nov 25, 1924	Legion Auditorium, Olympia, Washington, US	
67	Win	46–5–16	George Spencer	DQ	6 (6)	Nov 11, 1924	Crystal Pool, Seattle, Washington, US	
66	Win	45–5–16	Joe Gorman	PTS	6	Oct 21, 1924	Crystal Pool, Seattle, Washington, US	
65	Win	44–5–16	Danny Edwards	TKO	5 (6)	Oct 2, 1924	Legion Auditorium, Olympia, Washington, US	
64	Win	43–5–16	Stewart McLean	PTS	4	Apr 22, 1924	Arena, Vernon, California, US	
63	Win	42–5–16	John Bedent	PTS	4	Apr 10, 1924	Location unknown	Exact date unknown
62	Draw	41–5–16	Joe Gorman	PTS	6	Feb 26, 1924	Crystal Pool, Seattle, Washington, US	Retained Pacific Coast featherweight title
61	Win	41–5–15	Frankie Britt	KO	3 (6)	Jan 22, 1924	Crystal Pool, Seattle, Washington, US	Retained Pacific Coast featherweight title
60	Win	40–5–15	Danny Nunes	UD	6	Jan 8, 1924	Crystal Pool, Seattle, Washington, US	Retained Pacific Coast featherweight title
59	Draw	39–5–15	Frankie Britt	PTS	6	Jan 3, 1924	Tacoma, Washington, US	
58	Win	39–5–14	Fighting George Sollis	PTS	6	Dec 27, 1923	Glide Rink, Tacoma, Washington, US	
57	Win	38–5–14	Dandy Danny Dillon	DQ	4 (6)	Sep 26, 1923	Arena, Seattle, Washington, US	
56	Draw	37–5–14	Dandy Danny Dillon	PTS	6	Sep 12, 1923	Arena, Seattle, Washington, US	
55	Win	37–5–13	Bud Ridley	PTS	6	Sep 5, 1923	Arena, Seattle, Washington, US	Retained Pacific Coast featherweight title
54	Win	36–5–13	Bud Ridley	PTS	6	Aug 22, 1923	Arena, Seattle, Washington, US	Won Pacific Coast featherweight title
53	Loss	35–5–13	Eddie Spec Ramies	PTS	4	Jun 5, 1923	Arena, Vernon, California, US	
52	Win	35–4–13	Frankie McCann	PTS	4	May 25, 1923	Legion Stadium, Hollywood, California, US	
51	Win	34–4–13	Wildcat Willie O'Brien	PTS	4	May 18, 1923	Legion Stadium, Hollywood, California, US	
50	Win	33–4–13	Frankie McCann	PTS	4	May 4, 1923	Legion Stadium, Hollywood, California, US	
49	Win	32–4–13	Joe 'Petie' Coffey	PTS	4	Apr 25, 1923	Auditorium, Oakland, California, US	
48	Win	31–4–13	Jimmy Hackley	PTS	4	Feb 2, 1923	Legion Stadium, Hollywood, California, US	
47	Win	30–4–13	Dandy Danny Dillon	PTS	4	Jan 23, 1923	Arena, Vernon, California, US	
46	Win	29–4–13	California Joe Lynch	PTS	4	Jan 1, 1923	Auditorium, Oakland, California, US	
45	Win	28–4–13	Jimmy Mendo	PTS	4	Dec 13, 1922	Auditorium, Oakland, California, US	
44	Draw	27–4–13	Jimmy Mendo	PTS	4	Dec 6, 1922	Auditorium, Oakland, California, US	
43	Win	27–4–12	Vic Moran	PTS	4	Aug 22, 1922	Arcadia Pavilion, San Francisco, California, US	
42	Loss	26–4–12	Eddie Macy	PTS	4	Aug 9, 1922	Auditorium, Oakland, California, US	
41	Win	26–3–12	Eddie Spec Ramies	PTS	4	Aug 4, 1922	Dreamland Rink, San Francisco, California, US	
40	Win	25–3–12	Johnny McManus	PTS	4	Jul 12, 1922	Auditorium, Oakland, California, US	
39	Win	24–3–12	Dynamite Joe Murphy	PTS	4	Jul 7, 1922	Dreamland Rink, San Francisco, California, US	
38	Win	23–3–12	Trench King	PTS	4	Jun 30, 1922	Dreamland Rink, San Francisco, California, US	
37	Win	22–3–12	Sailor Frank Victola	KO	2 (4)	Jun 23, 1922	Dreamland Rink, San Francisco, California, US	
36	Loss	21–3–12	California Joe Lynch	PTS	4	May 31, 1922	Auditorium, Oakland, California, US	
35	Win	21–2–12	Ad Rubidoux	PTS	4	May 24, 1922	Auditorium, Oakland, California, US	
34	Draw	20–2–12	Young Farrell	PTS	4	May 3, 1922	Auditorium, Oakland, California, US	
33	Win	20–2–11	Dynamite Joe Murphy	PTS	4	Apr 12, 1922	Auditorium, Oakland, California, US	
32	Win	19–2–11	Fighting George Sollis	PTS	4	Apr 5, 1922	Auditorium, Oakland, California, US	
31	Win	18–2–11	California Joe Lynch	PTS	4	Mar 1, 1922	Auditorium, Oakland, California, US	
30	Draw	17–2–11	California Joe Lynch	PTS	4	Feb 22, 1922	Auditorium, Oakland, California, US	
29	Win	17–2–10	Johnny McManus	PTS	4	Jan 31, 1922	Arena, Vernon, California, US	
28	Win	16–2–10	Russ Pierce	PTS	4	Jan 25, 1922	Dreamland Arena, San Diego, California, US	
27	Loss	15–2–10	George Thompson	PTS	4	Jan 9, 1922	Coliseum, San Diego, California, US	
26	Draw	15–1–10	George Thompson	PTS	4	Jan 2, 1922	Coliseum, San Diego, California, US	
25	Draw	15–1–9	Willie Shyrock	PTS	4	Dec 12, 1921	Coliseum, San Diego, California, US	
24	Win	15–1–8	Bud Miller	KO	2 (4)	Dec 5, 1921	Coliseum, San Diego, California, US	
23	Win	14–1–8	Willie Shyrock	PTS	4	Nov 15, 1921	Arena, Vernon, California, US	
22	Win	13–1–8	Jimmy Hackley	PTS	4	Nov 8, 1921	Arena, Vernon, California, US	
21	Win	12–1–8	Willie Shyrock	PTS	4	Nov 1, 1921	Arena, Vernon, California, US	
20	Draw	11–1–8	Ad Remy	PTS	4	Oct 7, 1921	L. Street Arena, Sacramento, California, US	
19	Win	11–1–7	Young Georges Carpentier	PTS	4	Sep 16, 1921	L. Street Arena, Sacramento, California, US	
18	Win	10–1–7	Willie Shyrock	PTS	4	Sep 10, 1921	Location unknown	Exact date unknown
17	Win	9–1–7	Young Georges Carpentier	PTS	4	Sep 2, 1921	Hoffman A.C., Sacramento, California, US	
16	Draw	8–1–7	Alex McDonald	PTS	4	Aug 8, 1921	Vallejo, California, US	
15	Win	8–1–6	Trench King	PTS	4	Jul 8, 1921	Pastime A.C., Sacramento, California, US	
14	Draw	7–1–6	Alex McDonald	PTS	4	Jun 15, 1921	Location unknown	Exact date unknown
13	Draw	7–1–5	Trench King	PTS	4	May 20, 1921	L. Street Arena, Sacramento, California, US	
12	Win	7–1–4	Alex McDonald	PTS	4	May 10, 1921	Vallejo, California, US	
11	Win	6–1–4	Frankie Novey	PTS	4	May 6, 1921	L. Street Arena, Sacramento, California, US	
10	Draw	5–1–4	Trench King	PTS	4	Apr 15, 1921	Location unknown	Date unknown
9	Win	5–1–3	Alex McDonald	PTS	4	Apr 10, 1921	Location unknown	Date unknown
8	Win	4–1–3	Young Mike Gibbons	PTS	4	Apr 6, 1921	Benicia, California, US	
7	Win	3–1–3	Sammy Girsch	PTS	4	Feb 10, 1921	Location unknown	Date unknown
6	Win	2–1–3	Joe Bell	PTS	4	Jan 10, 1921	Location unknown	Date unknown
5	Win	1–1–3	Young Mike Gibbons	PTS	4	Nov 23, 1920	Vallejo, Washington, US	
4	Draw	0–1–3	George Young Green	PTS	4	Oct 23, 1920	Vallejo, Washington, US	
3	Draw	0–1–2	Young Porter	PTS	3	May 14, 1920	Concrete Theatre, Concrete, Washington, US	
2	Loss	0–1–1	Pete Moe	KO	? (?)	Mar 26, 1920	Anacortes, Washington, US	
1	Draw	0–0–1	Johnny Bitoni	PTS	4	Mar 12, 1920	Concrete Theatre, Concrete, Washington, US	

=== Unofficial record ===
218 fights	138 wins	45 losses
By knockout	29	4
By decision	102	40
By disqualification	7	1
Draws	33	
No contests	2	

Record with the inclusion of newspaper decisions in the win/loss/draw column.

No.	Result	Record	Opponent	Type	Round, time	Date	Location	Notes
218	Win	138–45–33 (2)	Young Llew Edwards	PTS	12	Jul 18, 1942	West Melbourne Stadium, Melbourne, Australia	
217	Loss	137–45–33 (2)	Vic Patrick	TKO	11 (12), 1:40	Mar 9, 1942	Sydney Stadium, Sydney, Australia	Police intervened
216	Loss	137–44–33 (2)	Vic Patrick	PTS	15	Sep 11, 1941	Sydney Stadium, Sydney, Australia	
215	Loss	137–43–33 (2)	Vic Patrick	PTS	15	Jul 3, 1941	Sydney Stadium, Sydney, Australia	Lost Australian lightweight title
214	Win	137–42–33 (2)	Vic Patrick	DQ	5 (12)	Jun 5, 1941	Sydney Stadium, Sydney, Australia	
213	Win	136–42–33 (2)	Ron McLaughlin	PTS	12	Mar 15, 1941	West Melbourne Stadium, Melbourne, Australia	
212	Loss	135–42–33 (2)	Alan Westbury	PTS	15	Feb 8, 1941	Greater Newcastle Stadium, Newcastle, Australia	
211	Win	135–41–33 (2)	Alan Westbury	PTS	12	Feb 1, 1941	Greater Newcastle Stadium, Newcastle, Australia	
210	Draw	134–41–33 (2)	Ron McLaughlin	PTS	12	Jan 18, 1941	Greater Newcastle Stadium, Newcastle, Australia	
209	Win	134–41–32 (2)	Joe Hall	DQ	11 (15)	Dec 26, 1940	North Sydney Oval, Sydney, Australia	Retained Australian lightweight title
208	Win	133–41–32 (2)	Tiger Charley Parks	DQ	3 (12)	Dec 14, 1940	Broken Hill Stadium, Broken Hill, Australia	
207	Win	132–41–32 (2)	Len Fay	PTS	12	Nov 25, 1940	Grenfell Street Stadium, Adelaide, Australia	
206	Win	131–41–32 (2)	Tiger Charley Parks	TKO	4 (15)	Oct 29, 1940	Town Hall, Kalgoorlie, Australia	
205	Win	130–41–32 (2)	Johnny Hutchinson	PTS	12	Apr 24, 1940	West Melbourne Stadium, Melbourne, Australia	
204	Loss	129–41–32 (2)	Clever Henry	PTS	12	Apr 13, 1940	West Melbourne Stadium, Melbourne, Australia	
203	Win	129–40–32 (2)	Fighting Carlos	TKO	12 (12)	Mar 26, 1940	Sydney Stadium, Sydney, Australia	
202	Win	128–40–32 (2)	Herb Bishop	PTS	12	Feb 23, 1940	W.A.C.A. Grounds, Perth, Australia	
201	Win	127–40–32 (2)	Claude Varner	TKO	7 (12)	Feb 15, 1940	W.A.C.A. Grounds, Perth, Australia	Retained Australian lightweight title
200	Win	126–40–32 (2)	Claude Varner	PTS	12	Jan 26, 1940	W.A.C.A. Grounds, Perth, Australia	
199	Win	125–40–32 (2)	Paddy Boxall	RTD	3 (15)	Dec 26, 1939	Hollywood Stadium, Perth, Australia	Won Australian lightweight title
198	Win	124–40–32 (2)	Danny LaVerne	PTS	12	Nov 10, 1939	Hollywood Stadium, Perth, Australia	
197	Loss	123–40–32 (2)	Danny LaVerne	PTS	12	Oct 6, 1939	Hollywood Stadium, Perth, Australia	
196	Loss	123–39–32 (2)	Paddy Boxall	PTS	15	Jun 30, 1939	Hollywood Stadium, Perth, Australia	Lost Australian lightweight title
195	Draw	123–38–32 (2)	Johnny Hutchinson	PTS	12	May 12, 1939	Brisbane Stadium, Brisbane, Australia	
194	Win	123–38–31 (2)	Graham Evans	RTD	10 (15)	Feb 24, 1939	Unity Theatre, Perth, Australia	
193	Win	122–38–31 (2)	Herb Bishop	PTS	15	Dec 26, 1938	Hollywood Theatre, Perth, Australia	
192	Win	121–38–31 (2)	Bob King	KO	6 (15)	Dec 9, 1938	Hollywood Theatre, Perth, Australia	
191	Loss	120–38–31 (2)	Herb Bishop	PTS	12	Sep 12, 1938	Town Hall, Kalgoorlie, Australia	
190	Win	120–37–31 (2)	Mickey Leonard	TKO	8 (12)	Jul 22, 1938	Unity Stadium, Perth, Australia	
189	Win	119–37–31 (2)	Herb Bishop	PTS	12	Jul 7, 1938	Town Hall, Kalgoorlie, Australia	
188	Win	118–37–31 (2)	Ron McLaughlin	KO	10 (12)	May 11, 1938	Leichhardt Stadium, Sydney, Australia	
187	Win	117–37–31 (2)	Jimmy Dundee	RTD	6 (12)	Apr 29, 1938	Lithgow Stadium, Lithgow, Australia	
186	Win	116–37–31 (2)	Jimmy Dundee	KO	6 (15)	Mar 12, 1938	Newcastle Stadium, Newcastle, Australia	Won Australian lightweight title
185	Win	115–37–31 (2)	Manuel Cuzzulini	TKO	4 (12)	Mar 5, 1938	Newcastle Stadium, Newcastle, Australia	
184	Win	114–37–31 (2)	Herb Bishop	PTS	12	Oct 5, 1937	Leichhardt Stadium, Sydney, Australia	
183	Win	113–37–31 (2)	Jimmy Dundee	KO	4 (12)	Sep 21, 1937	Leichhardt Stadium, Sydney, Australia	
182	Win	112–37–31 (2)	Clever Henry	PTS	15	Jun 30, 1937	Leichhardt Stadium, Sydney, Australia	
181	Win	111–37–31 (2)	Bert Osborne	PTS	15	Jun 9, 1937	Leichhardt Stadium, Sydney, Australia	
180	Win	110–37–31 (2)	Herb Bishop	PTS	15	May 19, 1937	Leichhardt Stadium, Sydney, Australia	
179	Win	109–37–31 (2)	Sid Clarke	KO	5 (15)	Apr 23, 1937	Agricultural Hall, Wollongong, Australia	
178	Win	108–37–31 (2)	Mickey Leonard	KO	2 (15)	Mar 20, 1937	Broken Hill Stadium, Broken Hill, Australia	
177	Loss	107–37–31 (2)	Saverio Turiello	PTS	15	Feb 3, 1936	Sydney Stadium, Sydney, Australia	
176	Loss	107–36–31 (2)	Kid Moro	PTS	10	Nov 15, 1935	Civic Auditorium, Honolulu, Hawaii	
175	Loss	107–35–31 (2)	Gordon Wallace	PTS	10	May 8, 1935	Denman Auditorium, Vancouver, British Columbia, Canada	
174	Loss	107–34–31 (2)	Willard Brown	PTS	15	Feb 4, 1935	Sydney Stadium, Sydney, Australia	
173	Win	107–33–31 (2)	Reg Hickey	KO	8 (15)	Dec 10, 1934	Sydney Stadium, Sydney, Australia	
172	Loss	106–33–31 (2)	Jack Portney	PTS	15	Dec 3, 1934	Sydney Stadium, Sydney, Australia	
171	Draw	106–32–31 (2)	Jack Portney	PTS	15	Nov 12, 1934	Sydney Stadium, Sydney, Australia	
170	Loss	106–32–30 (2)	Herb Bishop	PTS	10	Nov 5, 1934	Sydney Stadium, Sydney, Australia	
169	NC	106–31–30 (2)	Herb Bishop	NC	5 (15)	Oct 15, 1934	Sydney Stadium, Sydney, Australia	non contest as both boxers were "unusually cautious"
168	Loss	106–31–30 (1)	Jack Carroll	PTS	15	Aug 27, 1934	Sydney Stadium, Sydney, Australia	
167	Draw	106–30–30 (1)	Reg Hickey	PTS	15	Aug 8, 1934	Brisbane Stadium, Brisbane, Australia	
166	Win	106–30–29 (1)	Herb Bishop	PTS	15	Jul 30, 1934	Sydney Stadium, Sydney, Australia	
165	Win	105–30–29 (1)	Tommy Johns	KO	1 (15), 2:30	Jul 16, 1934	Sydney Stadium, Sydney, Australia	
164	Win	104–30–29 (1)	Jimmy Kelso	KO	8 (15), 2:20	Jul 2, 1934	Sydney Stadium, Sydney, Australia	
163	Loss	103–30–29 (1)	Joe Ghnouly	PTS	15	Apr 30, 1934	Sydney Stadium, Sydney, Australia	
162	Draw	103–29–29 (1)	Jimmy Kelso	PTS	15	Nov 20, 1933	Sydney Stadium, Sydney, Australia	
161	Win	103–29–28 (1)	Jimmy Kelso	PTS	15	Nov 11, 1933	West Melbourne Stadium, Melbourne, Australia	
160	Loss	102–29–28 (1)	Jimmy Kelso	PTS	15	Oct 30, 1933	Sydney Stadium, Sydney, Australia	
159	Loss	102–28–28 (1)	Jack Carroll	PTS	15	Oct 9, 1933	Sydney Stadium, Sydney, Australia	
158	Draw	102–27–28 (1)	Nel Tarleton	PTS	15	Sep 25, 1933	Sydney Stadium, Sydney, Australia	
157	Win	102–27–27 (1)	Bobby Blay	PTS	15	Sep 4, 1933	Sydney Stadium, Sydney, Australia	Not to be confused with Bobby Flay
156	Win	101–27–27 (1)	Leo Dardeen	KO	6 (10)	Jul 13, 1933	Arena, White Center, Washington, US	
155	Win	100–27–27 (1)	Victor Kid Ponce	KO	2 (15)	May 30, 1933	Arcade Auditorium, Vancouver, British Columbia, Canada	
154	Win	99–27–27 (1)	Pastor Calope	PTS	6	May 15, 1933	Auditorium, Wenatchee, Washington, US	
153	Win	98–27–27 (1)	Eddie Santry	PTS	6	May 5, 1933	Elks Club, Bremerton, Washington, US	
152	Win	97–27–27 (1)	Pastor Calope	PTS	6	May 3, 1933	Eagles Hall, Yakima, Washington, US	
151	Win	96–27–27 (1)	Albie Davies	PTS	8	Apr 25, 1933	Arcade Auditorium, Vancouver, British Columbia, Canada	
150	Win	95–27–27 (1)	Pastor Calope	PTS	6	Apr 7, 1933	Elks Club, Bremerton, Washington, US	
149	Win	94–27–27 (1)	Pastor Calope	PTS	6	Mar 29, 1933	Labor Temple, Everett, Washington, US	
148	Draw	93–27–27 (1)	Albie Davies	MD	15	Mar 4, 1933	Pacific Stadium, Victoria, British Columbia, Canada	
147	Loss	93–27–26 (1)	Alvin Lewis	PTS	6	Dec 20, 1932	Crystal Pool, Seattle, Washington, US	
146	Draw	93–26–26 (1)	Henry Woods	MD	6	Dec 6, 1932	Crystal Pool, Seattle, Washington, US	
145	Win	93–26–25 (1)	Albie Davies	PTS	10	Dec 1, 1932	Pacific Stadium, Victoria, British Columbia, Canada	
144	Draw	92–26–25 (1)	Albie Davies	PTS	6	Nov 8, 1932	Arcade Auditorium, Vancouver, British Columbia, Canada	
143	Loss	92–26–24 (1)	Kenny LaSalle	PTS	10	Sep 9, 1932	Legion Stadium, Hollywood, California, US	
142	Win	92–25–24 (1)	Baby Sal Sorio	DQ	8 (10)	Aug 19, 1932	Legion Stadium, Hollywood, California, US	
141	Win	91–25–24 (1)	Sammy Mandell	PTS	10	Jul 8, 1932	Legion Stadium, Hollywood, California, US	
140	Loss	90–25–24 (1)	Don Fraser	SD	6	Jun 23, 1932	Arena, Dishman, Washington, US	
139	Win	90–24–24 (1)	Leslie 'Wildcat' Carter	TKO	7 (8)	Jun 14, 1932	Arcade Auditorium, Vancouver, British Columbia, Canada	
138	Loss	89–24–24 (1)	Mushy Callahan	PTS	10	May 6, 1932	Legion Stadium, Hollywood, California, US	
137	Win	89–23–24 (1)	Johnny Albin	TKO	8 (10)	Mar 3, 1932	Orange Belt A.C., San Bernardino, California, US	
136	Win	88–23–24 (1)	Baby Sal Sorio	PTS	10	Feb 17, 1932	Orange Belt A.C., San Bernardino, California, US	
135	Loss	87–23–24 (1)	Don Fraser	PTS	6	Jan 21, 1932	Greenwich Coliseum, Tacoma, Washington, US	
134	Win	87–22–24 (1)	Eddie Volk	PTS	6	Jan 1, 1932	Auditorium, Portland, Oregon, US	
133	Loss	86–22–24 (1)	Bobby Pacho	TKO	7 (10), 1:47	Nov 10, 1931	Olympic Auditorium, Los Angeles, California, US	
132	Win	86–21–24 (1)	Sammy Santos	UD	8	Oct 14, 1931	Civic Ice Arena, Seattle, Washington, US	
131	ND	85–21–24 (1)	Paddy Sullivan	ND	4	Oct 8, 1931	Port Angeles, Washington, US	
130	Win	85–21–24	Sammy Santos	PTS	10	Sep 30, 1931	Civic Ice Arena, Seattle, Washington, US	
129	Win	84–21–24	Eddie Thomas	PTS	10	Sep 22, 1931	Armory, Portland, Oregon, US	
128	Win	83–21–24	Cecil Payne	PTS	10	Sep 3, 1931	Memorial Auditorium, Sacramento, California, US	
127	Win	82–21–24	Frankie Stetson	PTS	10	Aug 19, 1931	Auditorium, Oakland, California, US	
126	Loss	81–21–24	Bobby Pacho	PTS	10	Aug 11, 1931	Olympic Auditorium, Los Angeles, California, US	Lost USA California State lightweight title
125	Win	81–20–24	Goldie Hess	PTS	8	Jul 1, 1931	Civic Ice Arena, Seattle, Washington, US	
124	Loss	80–20–24	Cecil Payne	PTS	10	May 12, 1931	Olympic Auditorium, Los Angeles, California, US	
123	Win	80–19–24	Ramon Ortega	KO	2 (4)	Apr 10, 1931	Dreamland Auditorium, San Francisco, California, US	
122	Win	79–19–24	Goldie Hess	PTS	10	Mar 24, 1931	Olympic Auditorium, Los Angeles, California, US	Won USA California State lightweight title
121	Loss	78–19–24	Billy Townsend	PTS	10	Feb 17, 1931	Olympic Auditorium, Los Angeles, California, US	
120	Win	78–18–24	Battling Siki	PTS	10	Jan 16, 1931	Phoenix, Arizona, US	
119	Win	77–18–24	Hector McDonald	PTS	10	Oct 21, 1930	Olympic Auditorium, Los Angeles, California, US	
118	Win	76–18–24	Santiago Zorrilla	PTS	8	Sep 23, 1930	Civic Ice Arena, Seattle, Washington, US	
117	Win	75–18–24	Eddie Mack	PTS	6	Aug 28, 1930	Civic Ice Arena, Seattle, Washington, US	
116	Win	74–18–24	Leslie 'Wildcat' Carter	PTS	6	Aug 14, 1930	Civic Auditorium, Seattle, Washington, US	
115	Win	73–18–24	Joey Coffman	PTS	6	Jul 25, 1930	Greenwich Coliseum, Tacoma, Washington, US	
114	Win	72–18–24	Don Fraser	PTS	6	Jul 23, 1930	Natatorium Park, Spokane, Washington, US	
113	Draw	71–18–24	Santiago Zorrilla	SD	15	Jun 6, 1930	Arena, Vancouver, British Columbia, Canada	
112	Loss	71–18–23	Benny Bass	KO	2 (15), 0:51	Dec 20, 1929	Madison Square Garden, New York City, New York, US	Lost NYSAC, NBA, and The Ring super featherweight titles
111	Loss	71–17–23	Eddie Mack	PTS	10	Nov 26, 1929	Olympic Auditorium, Los Angeles, California, US	
110	Draw	71–16–23	Billy Townsend	PTS	10	Nov 1, 1929	Arena, Vancouver, British Columbia, Canada	
109	Loss	71–16–22	Goldie Hess	PTS	10	Jul 9, 1929	Olympic Auditorium, Los Angeles, California, US	
108	Win	71–15–22	Baby Sal Sorio	PTS	10	May 20, 1929	Wrigley Field, Los Angeles, California, US	Retained NYSAC, NBA, and The Ring super featherweight titles
107	Draw	70–15–22	Eddie Mack	SD	10	Apr 23, 1929	City Auditorium, Denver, Colorado, US	
106	Win	70–15–21	Santiago Zorrilla	UD	10	Apr 4, 1929	Olympic Auditorium, Los Angeles, California, US	Retained NYSAC, NBA, and The Ring super featherweight titles
105	Loss	69–15–21	Eddie Mack	UD	10	Jan 8, 1929	City Auditorium, Denver, Colorado, US	
104	Loss	69–14–21	Joey Sangor	NWS	10	Jan 1, 1929	State Armory, San Francisco, California, US	NYSAC, NBA, and The Ring super featherweight titles at stake; (via KO only)
103	Draw	69–13–21	Santiago Zorrilla	PTS	10	Dec 3, 1928	State Armory, San Francisco, California, US	Retained NYSAC, NBA, and The Ring super featherweight titles
102	Loss	69–13–20	King Tut	NWS	10	Oct 2, 1928	Auditorium, Minneapolis, Minnesota, US	
101	Draw	69–12–20	Leslie 'Wildcat' Carter	PTS	10	Sep 3, 1928	Arena, Vancouver, British Columbia, Canada	
100	Win	69–12–19	Eddie Martin	PTS	15	Jul 18, 1928	Ebbets Field, New York City, New York, US	Retained NYSAC, NBA, and The Ring super featherweight titles
99	Win	68–12–19	Eddie Martin	PTS	15	May 24, 1928	Madison Square Garden, New York City, New York, US	Retained NYSAC, NBA, and The Ring super featherweight titles
98	Loss	67–12–19	Jack Duffy	NWS	10	Apr 3, 1928	Armory, Toledo, Ohio, US	
97	Win	67–11–19	Ritchie King	PTS	10	Feb 24, 1928	Arena, Vancouver, British Columbia, Canada	
96	Win	66–11–19	Joe Glick	DQ	14 (15), 2:09	Dec 16, 1927	Madison Square Garden, New York City, New York, US	Retained NYSAC, NBA, and The Ring super featherweight titles; Glick was DQ'd for a low blow which knocked Morgan down
95	Loss	65–11–19	Dick Finnegan	PTS	10	Dec 2, 1927	Mechanics Building, Boston, Massachusetts, US	
94	Loss	65–10–19	Stanislaus Loayza	DQ	9 (10)	Sep 20, 1927	Coliseum, Chicago, Illinois, US	
93	Loss	65–9–19	Doc Snell	PTS	6	Jun 28, 1927	Dugdale Park, Seattle, Washington, US	
92	Win	65–8–19	Vic Foley	PTS	12	May 28, 1927	Arena, Vancouver, British Columbia, Canada	Retained NYSAC and The Ring super featherweight titles
91	Loss	64–8–19	Phil McGraw	MD	10	Jan 7, 1927	Madison Square Garden, New York City, New York, US	
90	Win	64–7–19	Carl Duane	UD	15	Nov 19, 1926	Madison Square Garden, New York City, New York, US	Retained NYSAC and The Ring super featherweight titles
89	Win	63–7–19	Johnny Dundee	PTS	10	Oct 19, 1926	Recreation Park, San Francisco, California, US	Retained NYSAC and The Ring super featherweight titles
88	Win	62–7–19	Joe Glick	PTS	15	Sep 30, 1926	Madison Square Garden, New York City, New York, US	Retained NYSAC and The Ring super featherweight titles
87	Loss	61–7–19	Tommy O'Brien	PTS	10	Aug 4, 1926	Olympic Auditorium, Los Angeles, California, US	
86	Win	61–6–19	Johnny Kochansky	NWS	10	Jul 9, 1926	Boyle's Thirty Acres, Jersey City, New Jersey, US	
85	Win	60–6–19	Ted Blatt	NWS	10	Jul 5, 1926	Olympic Arena, New York City, New York, US	
84	Loss	59–6–19	Babe Herman	UD	10	Jun 24, 1926	Cycle Track, Revere, Massachusetts, US	
83	Win	59–5–19	Steve Sullivan	TKO	6 (15)	Jun 3, 1926	Ebbets Field, New York City, New York, US	Retained NYSAC and The Ring super featherweight titles
82	Win	58–5–19	Eddie Brady	NWS	12	Mar 29, 1926	Rayen-Wood Auditorium, Youngstown, Ohio, US	
81	Draw	57–5–19	Charlie O'Connell	PTS	12	Mar 17, 1926	Public Hall, Cleveland, Ohio, US	
80	Win	57–5–18	Don Davis	NWS	10	Feb 26, 1926	East Chicago, Indiana, US	
79	Win	56–5–18	Jimmy Goodrich	NWS	10	Feb 22, 1926	Auditorium, Milwaukee, Wisconsin, US	
78	Win	55–5–18	Stewart McLean	PTS	10	Jan 13, 1926	Auditorium, Oakland, California, US	
77	Win	54–5–18	Sammy Compagno	TKO	7 (10)	Jan 7, 1926	Armory, Portland, Oregon, US	
76	Win	53–5–18	Mike Ballerino	TKO	10 (10)	Dec 2, 1925	Olympic Auditorium, Los Angeles, California, US	Won NYSAC and The Ring super featherweight titles
75	Win	52–5–18	Harry Wallach	PTS	10	Sep 9, 1925	Olympic Auditorium, Los Angeles, California, US	Retained Pacific Coast featherweight title
74	Win	51–5–18	Stewart McLean	PTS	10	Jun 19, 1925	Legion Stadium, Hollywood, California, US	
73	Win	50–5–18	Joe Gorman	PTS	10	Jun 10, 1925	Auditorium, Oakland, California, US	
72	Draw	49–5–18	Stewart McLean	PTS	10	Apr 22, 1925	Auditorium, Oakland, California, US	
71	Win	49–5–17	Gene Delmont	PTS	10	Mar 13, 1925	Legion Stadium, Hollywood, California, US	
70	Win	48–5–17	Doc Snell	PTS	6	Dec 30, 1924	Crystal Pool, Seattle, Washington, US	
69	Draw	47–5–17	Doc Snell	PTS	6	Dec 18, 1924	Glide Rink, Tacoma, Washington, US	
68	Win	47–5–16	Ad Mackie	UD	6	Nov 25, 1924	Legion Auditorium, Olympia, Washington, US	
67	Win	46–5–16	George Spencer	DQ	6 (6)	Nov 11, 1924	Crystal Pool, Seattle, Washington, US	
66	Win	45–5–16	Joe Gorman	PTS	6	Oct 21, 1924	Crystal Pool, Seattle, Washington, US	
65	Win	44–5–16	Danny Edwards	TKO	5 (6)	Oct 2, 1924	Legion Auditorium, Olympia, Washington, US	
64	Win	43–5–16	Stewart McLean	PTS	4	Apr 22, 1924	Arena, Vernon, California, US	
63	Win	42–5–16	John Bedent	PTS	4	Apr 10, 1924	Location unknown	Exact date unknown
62	Draw	41–5–16	Joe Gorman	PTS	6	Feb 26, 1924	Crystal Pool, Seattle, Washington, US	Retained Pacific Coast featherweight title
61	Win	41–5–15	Frankie Britt	KO	3 (6)	Jan 22, 1924	Crystal Pool, Seattle, Washington, US	Retained Pacific Coast featherweight title
60	Win	40–5–15	Danny Nunes	UD	6	Jan 8, 1924	Crystal Pool, Seattle, Washington, US	Retained Pacific Coast featherweight title
59	Draw	39–5–15	Frankie Britt	PTS	6	Jan 3, 1924	Tacoma, Washington, US	
58	Win	39–5–14	Fighting George Sollis	PTS	6	Dec 27, 1923	Glide Rink, Tacoma, Washington, US	
57	Win	38–5–14	Dandy Danny Dillon	DQ	4 (6)	Sep 26, 1923	Arena, Seattle, Washington, US	
56	Draw	37–5–14	Dandy Danny Dillon	PTS	6	Sep 12, 1923	Arena, Seattle, Washington, US	
55	Win	37–5–13	Bud Ridley	PTS	6	Sep 5, 1923	Arena, Seattle, Washington, US	Retained Pacific Coast featherweight title
54	Win	36–5–13	Bud Ridley	PTS	6	Aug 22, 1923	Arena, Seattle, Washington, US	Won Pacific Coast featherweight title
53	Loss	35–5–13	Eddie Spec Ramies	PTS	4	Jun 5, 1923	Arena, Vernon, California, US	
52	Win	35–4–13	Frankie McCann	PTS	4	May 25, 1923	Legion Stadium, Hollywood, California, US	
51	Win	34–4–13	Wildcat Willie O'Brien	PTS	4	May 18, 1923	Legion Stadium, Hollywood, California, US	
50	Win	33–4–13	Frankie McCann	PTS	4	May 4, 1923	Legion Stadium, Hollywood, California, US	
49	Win	32–4–13	Joe 'Petie' Coffey	PTS	4	Apr 25, 1923	Auditorium, Oakland, California, US	
48	Win	31–4–13	Jimmy Hackley	PTS	4	Feb 2, 1923	Legion Stadium, Hollywood, California, US	
47	Win	30–4–13	Dandy Danny Dillon	PTS	4	Jan 23, 1923	Arena, Vernon, California, US	
46	Win	29–4–13	California Joe Lynch	PTS	4	Jan 1, 1923	Auditorium, Oakland, California, US	
45	Win	28–4–13	Jimmy Mendo	PTS	4	Dec 13, 1922	Auditorium, Oakland, California, US	
44	Draw	27–4–13	Jimmy Mendo	PTS	4	Dec 6, 1922	Auditorium, Oakland, California, US	
43	Win	27–4–12	Vic Moran	PTS	4	Aug 22, 1922	Arcadia Pavilion, San Francisco, California, US	
42	Loss	26–4–12	Eddie Macy	PTS	4	Aug 9, 1922	Auditorium, Oakland, California, US	
41	Win	26–3–12	Eddie Spec Ramies	PTS	4	Aug 4, 1922	Dreamland Rink, San Francisco, California, US	
40	Win	25–3–12	Johnny McManus	PTS	4	Jul 12, 1922	Auditorium, Oakland, California, US	
39	Win	24–3–12	Dynamite Joe Murphy	PTS	4	Jul 7, 1922	Dreamland Rink, San Francisco, California, US	
38	Win	23–3–12	Trench King	PTS	4	Jun 30, 1922	Dreamland Rink, San Francisco, California, US	
37	Win	22–3–12	Sailor Frank Victola	KO	2 (4)	Jun 23, 1922	Dreamland Rink, San Francisco, California, US	
36	Loss	21–3–12	California Joe Lynch	PTS	4	May 31, 1922	Auditorium, Oakland, California, US	
35	Win	21–2–12	Ad Rubidoux	PTS	4	May 24, 1922	Auditorium, Oakland, California, US	
34	Draw	20–2–12	Young Farrell	PTS	4	May 3, 1922	Auditorium, Oakland, California, US	
33	Win	20–2–11	Dynamite Joe Murphy	PTS	4	Apr 12, 1922	Auditorium, Oakland, California, US	
32	Win	19–2–11	Fighting George Sollis	PTS	4	Apr 5, 1922	Auditorium, Oakland, California, US	
31	Win	18–2–11	California Joe Lynch	PTS	4	Mar 1, 1922	Auditorium, Oakland, California, US	
30	Draw	17–2–11	California Joe Lynch	PTS	4	Feb 22, 1922	Auditorium, Oakland, California, US	
29	Win	17–2–10	Johnny McManus	PTS	4	Jan 31, 1922	Arena, Vernon, California, US	
28	Win	16–2–10	Russ Pierce	PTS	4	Jan 25, 1922	Dreamland Arena, San Diego, California, US	
27	Loss	15–2–10	George Thompson	PTS	4	Jan 9, 1922	Coliseum, San Diego, California, US	
26	Draw	15–1–10	George Thompson	PTS	4	Jan 2, 1922	Coliseum, San Diego, California, US	
25	Draw	15–1–9	Willie Shyrock	PTS	4	Dec 12, 1921	Coliseum, San Diego, California, US	
24	Win	15–1–8	Bud Miller	KO	2 (4)	Dec 5, 1921	Coliseum, San Diego, California, US	
23	Win	14–1–8	Willie Shyrock	PTS	4	Nov 15, 1921	Arena, Vernon, California, US	
22	Win	13–1–8	Jimmy Hackley	PTS	4	Nov 8, 1921	Arena, Vernon, California, US	
21	Win	12–1–8	Willie Shyrock	PTS	4	Nov 1, 1921	Arena, Vernon, California, US	
20	Draw	11–1–8	Ad Remy	PTS	4	Oct 7, 1921	L. Street Arena, Sacramento, California, US	
19	Win	11–1–7	Young Georges Carpentier	PTS	4	Sep 16, 1921	L. Street Arena, Sacramento, California, US	
18	Win	10–1–7	Willie Shyrock	PTS	4	Sep 10, 1921	Location unknown	Exact date unknown
17	Win	9–1–7	Young Georges Carpentier	PTS	4	Sep 2, 1921	Hoffman A.C., Sacramento, California, US	
16	Draw	8–1–7	Alex McDonald	PTS	4	Aug 8, 1921	Vallejo, California, US	
15	Win	8–1–6	Trench King	PTS	4	Jul 8, 1921	Pastime A.C., Sacramento, California, US	
14	Draw	7–1–6	Alex McDonald	PTS	4	Jun 15, 1921	Location unknown	Exact date unknown
13	Draw	7–1–5	Trench King	PTS	4	May 20, 1921	L. Street Arena, Sacramento, California, US	
12	Win	7–1–4	Alex McDonald	PTS	4	May 10, 1921	Vallejo, California, US	
11	Win	6–1–4	Frankie Novey	PTS	4	May 6, 1921	L. Street Arena, Sacramento, California, US	
10	Draw	5–1–4	Trench King	PTS	4	Apr 15, 1921	Location unknown	Date unknown
9	Win	5–1–3	Alex McDonald	PTS	4	Apr 10, 1921	Location unknown	Date unknown
8	Win	4–1–3	Young Mike Gibbons	PTS	4	Apr 6, 1921	Benicia, California, US	
7	Win	3–1–3	Sammy Girsch	PTS	4	Feb 10, 1921	Location unknown	Date unknown
6	Win	2–1–3	Joe Bell	PTS	4	Jan 10, 1921	Location unknown	Date unknown
5	Win	1–1–3	Young Mike Gibbons	PTS	4	Nov 23, 1920	Vallejo, Washington, US	
4	Draw	0–1–3	George Young Green	PTS	4	Oct 23, 1920	Vallejo, Washington, US	
3	Draw	0–1–2	Young Porter	PTS	3	May 14, 1920	Concrete Theatre, Concrete, Washington, US	
2	Loss	0–1–1	Pete Moe	KO	? (?)	Mar 26, 1920	Anacortes, Washington, US	
1	Draw	0–0–1	Johnny Bitoni	PTS	4	Mar 12, 1920	Concrete Theatre, Concrete, Washington, US	

== Titles in boxing ==
=== Major world titles ===
- NYSAC super featherweight champion (130 lbs)
- NBA (WBA) super featherweight champion (Note: Inaugural champion.) (130 lbs)

=== The Ring magazine titles ===
- The Ring super featherweight champion (130 lbs)

=== Regional/International titles ===
- Pacific Coast featherweight champion (126 lbs)
- California State lightweight champion (135 lbs)
- Australian lightweight champion (135 lbs) (2×)

=== Undisputed titles ===
- Undisputed super featherweight champion (Note: First ever undisputed super featherweight champion.)

== See also ==
- List of super featherweight boxing champions

== Notes and references ==
=== References ===
Achievements
Preceded by Mike Ballerino	World Super Featherweight Champion; December 2, 1925 - December 20, 1929	Succeeded by Benny Bass
