= Fighting Blood (1951 film) =

- Directed by: Clive Ross
- Written by: Tom Gurr
- Produced by: Ken G. Hall
- Narrated by: Lloyd Berrell
- Production company: Cinesound Productions
- Release date: 1951
- Running time: 18 mins
- Country: Australia
- Language: English

Fighting Blood is a 1951 short Australian documentary about boxing in Australia.

It included footage of boxers such as Les Darcy, Dave Sands, Jack Hassen, Alfie Clay, Elley Bennett, Freddie Dawson, Vic Patrick, Ron Richards and Fred Henneberry.

The fights shown:

- Les Darcy v. George Chip (1916);
- BUy Bennett v, Vic Elsen;
- Jack Hassen v: Freddie Dawson;
- Ron Richards v. Fred Henneberry;
- Ron Richards v. Gus Lesnevitch;
- Vic Patrick v. Freddie Dawson (Patrick's last bout);
- Dave Sands v. Henry Brlmm.

== Release ==
The movie had a season at Sydney's Victory Theatre.

== Critical reception ==
According to the Sydney Morning Herald "one or two boxing critics have made the seditious suggestion that Les Darcy does not show up too well in" the film in the scene where Darcy fights George Chip. "It's true that Darcy looks a boxer of the plain rather than the fancy kind, without any interest in the subtleties ofdefence... The film leaves no doubt that Darcy was a formidable and pug-nacious fellow."

The Adelaide Advertiser called the film "short, but brilliantly produced", and continued, "In 18 minutes' screen time is packed the neatest, crispest KO to the wise acres that could be imagined even by the American movie experts."

The Tribune thought the film glamorised the plight of Aboriginal boxers.
