= Humphrey Archeological Site =

- U.S. National Register of Historic Places
- Area: 15 acres (6.1 ha)
- NRHP reference No.: 74001122
- Added to NRHP: January 21, 1974

The Humphrey Archeological Site, near Mullen in Hooker County, Nebraska, was listed on the National Register of Historic Places in 1974.

It was the site of a prehistoric village or camp. The archeological site is designated by Smithsonian trinomial of 25 HO 21.

It is a village site which is one of only two known in the Sandhills to show evidence of corn cultivation.

It was named for archeologist Humphrey.
