= Jimmy Kelso =

Australian boxer

Personal information
- Nationality: Australian
- Born: 10 March 1910 Sydney, Australia
- Died: 23 February 1988 (aged 77) Bondi, Australia
- Weight: feather/light/welterweight

Boxing career

Boxing record
- Total fights: 76
- Wins: 39 (KO 36)
- Losses: 27 (KO 11)
- Draws: 10

James Emanuel Kelso (10 March 1910, Sydney – 23 February 1988, Bondi) was an Australian professional feather/light/welterweight boxer of the 1920s and '30s who won the New South Wales State (Australia) lightweight title, Australian lightweight title, and British Empire lightweight title, his professional fighting weight varied from 119 lb (54 kg; 8 st 7 lb), i.e. Featherweight to 144 3/4 lb (65.7 kg; 10 st 4.8 lb), i.e. Welterweight.
