= Kid Chocolate =

Cuban boxer (1910–1988)

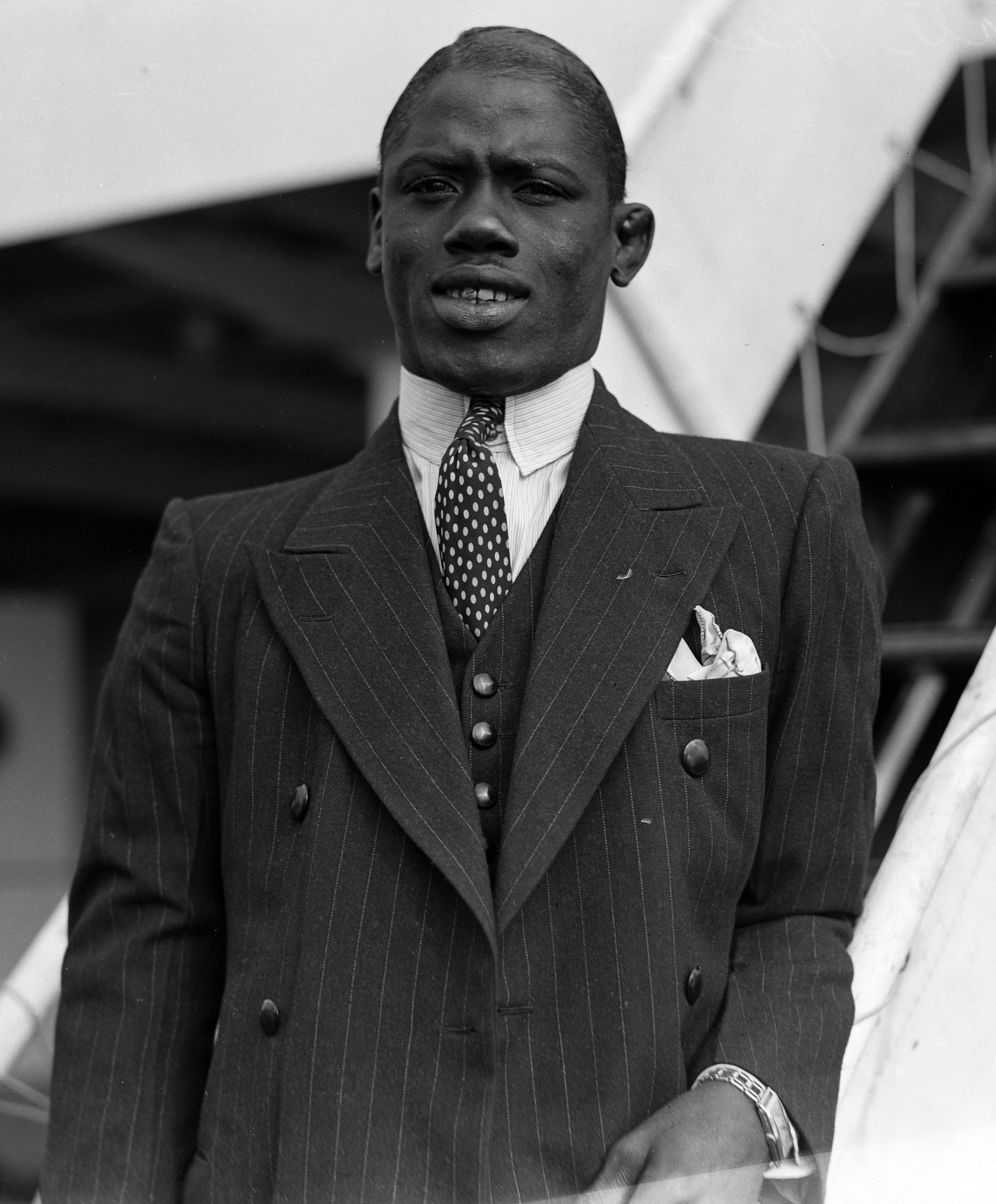

Personal information
- Nickname: The Cuban Bon Bon
- Born: Eligio Sardiñas Montalvo; January 6, 1910 Cerro, Havana, Cuba
- Died: August 8, 1988 (aged 78) Cuba
- Height: 1.68 m (5 ft 6 in)
- Weight: Lightweight; Super Featherweight; Featherweight

Boxing career
- Reach: 165 cm (65 in)
- Stance: Orthodox

Boxing record
- Total fights: 152
- Wins: 136
- Win by KO: 51
- Losses: 10
- Draws: 6

Eligio Sardiñas Montalvo (January 6, 1910 – August 8, 1988), better known as Kid Chocolate, was a Cuban boxer who enjoyed great success both in the boxing ring and outside it during the 1930s. Chocolate boxed professionally between 1927 and 1938. His record was 136 wins, 10 losses and 6 draws, 51 wins coming by knockout and one no-decision bout, also making Ring magazine's list of boxers with 50 or more career knockout wins. He was inducted into the International Boxing Hall of Fame in 1991.

== Biography ==
=== Career ===
==== Early years ====
Sardiñas, also nicknamed The Cuban Bon Bon, learned how to fight by watching old fight films in Cuba. He later sparred with boxers such as Benny Leonard and Jack Johnson, all world champions, before beginning an amateur boxing career. Sardiñas had no fear and would actively engage in fights outside the ring with anyone who wanted it.

His professional boxing debut, officially, occurred on March 3, 1928, when he knocked out Juan Sarriá Rodríguez aka 'Kid Sotolongo' via first-round KO of a scheduled 6 round bout after having fought and won 3 semi-professional bouts from October 1927 to February 1928.

==== Taking the World Jr. Lightweight Championship ====
After going up in weight class to the Junior Lightweight division, he started 1931 by winning four fights in a row. Then, on July 15, his dream of becoming Cuba's first world boxing champion finally came true, as he knocked out the defending world Junior Lightweight champion Benny Bass in seven rounds to take the world title. Five non-title wins followed, including a first-round knockout in a rematch with Scalfaro. He finished the year by going up in weight once again, and challenging world Lightweight champion Tony Canzoneri, losing by a decision in 15 in his first attempt to gain the Lightweight crown.

He started 1932 by winning his first eight bouts, including a world title defense in Havana against Davie Abad, beaten in 15 by decision. Then, he faced "Kid" Berg in a rematch, losing again, this time by decision in 15. He engaged in seven more bouts, including two decision wins over Johnny Farr, before fighting Lew Feldman on October 13. The fight was recognized as a world Featherweight title bout, but only by the New York state athletic commission. Chocolate won by a knockout in 12 rounds, gaining the New York World title.

He defended that world title twice, including a third fight with LaBarba, before relinquishing it while in the middle of a European boxing tour that took him to Madrid, Barcelona and Paris. He won all of his fights on that tour by decision. Upon returning to America, he lost by a knockout in two in a rematch with Canzoneri.

==== Losing the World Jr. Lightweight Title to Frankie Klick ====
Before a crowd of 4,000, the Kid lost the World Jr. Lightweight boxing championship to Frankie Klick, on December 25, 1933, at the Arena in Philadelphia, Pennsylvania, in a seventh-round technical knockout. The Ludington Daily News, wrote "The flashy Cuban "bon bon" (Chocolate) was bereft of the title in the seventh round of a scheduled fifteen round Christmas Day bout by a whistling right smash to the chin and all he got in exchange was the second knockout of his career although the latest was of the technical variety." The bout had been fairly close until the seventh with Chocolate showing stamina and style. The seventh round had gone two minutes and fifty-eight seconds when the knockout occurred. "The Cuban waged a fast, aggressive fight in the early rounds that gave him a temporary lead." Chocolate had landed rights "to the head and body." Kid Chocolate may have been suffering from the knockout he had received from Tony Canzoneri only a month previously. Chocolate retained his featherweight championship at least in the state of New York. After that fight, it was revealed that he was suffering from syphilis.

==== Later years ====
He retired shortly thereafter, but came back in 1934. He won 47 of his next 50 bouts. He never received another world title attempt and felt abandoned by boxing's elite. He retired again in 1938.

Kid Chocolate enjoyed the city's nightlife. However, when he stepped out of boxing, he went back to Cuba and lived a quieter life.

==== Legacy ====
From 1959, Chocolate's fame in Cuba was overlooked by Fidel Castro and his revolutionary forces, and he almost became a forgotten champion. But, by the late 1970s, Chocolate's achievements were finally recognized by the Cuban government, who gave him a small pension. Chocolate died in his own home – bought for his mother when he was champion – in 1988.

He was the inspiration for the character Chocolate Drop in Clifford Odets' play Golden Boy.

Former WBO middleweight champion Peter Quillin, an American of Cuban descent, carries the nickname "Kid Chocolate" in honor of Sardiñas.

The highly acclaimed boxer Sugar Ray Robinson was a big fan of Kid Chocolate and incorporated a lot of Chocolate's boxing style into his own: "Sugar Ray Robinson was a great admirer of Kid Chocolate," said Fausto Miranda, a former Cuban journalist who covered many of Chocolate's fights. Sugar Ray Robinson went on record saying that he had never seen anyone box like Kid Chocolate before. Robinson studied the Chocolate style and incorporated much of his movement and flair into his own boxing style. Robinson mixed the styles of Louis and of Chocolate throughout his career.

Montalvo was also the cousin of the lesser known flyweight contender Eladio 'Black Bill' Valdés.

== Professional boxing record ==
152 fights	136 wins	10 losses
By knockout	51	2
By decision	84	8
By disqualification	1	0
Draws	6	

No.	Result	Record	Opponent	Type	Round	Date	Location	Notes
152	Draw	136–10–6	Nicky Jerome	PTS	10	Dec 18, 1938	Palacio de Deportes, Havana, Cuba	
151	Win	136–10–5	Fillo Echevarria	PTS	10	Mar 20, 1938	Arena Polar, Havana, Cuba	
150	Win	135–10–5	Johnny Mirabella	KO	4 (10)	Dec 23, 1937	Arena Cristal, Havana, Cuba	
149	Win	134–10–5	Young Chappie	PTS	10	Nov 6, 1937	Arena Cristal, Havana, Cuba	
148	Win	133–10–5	Phil Baker	PTS	10	Sep 5, 1937	Estadio Tropical, Havana, Cuba	
147	Win	132–10–5	Johnny DeFoe	UD	10	Aug 19, 1937	Madison Square Garden, New York City, New York, U.S.	
146	Win	131–10–5	Jimmy Tramberia	KO	3 (10)	Aug 16, 1937	Hempstead Bowl, Hempstead, New York, U.S.	
145	Win	130–10–5	Joe Marciente	PTS	10	Aug 13, 1937	Fort Hamilton Arena, New York City, New York, U.S.	
144	Win	129–10–5	Charley Gomer	PTS	10	Aug 2, 1937	Carlin's Park, Baltimore, Maryland, U.S.	
143	Draw	128–10–5	Orville Drouillard	PTS	8	Jul 27, 1937	Braddock Bowl, Jersey City, New Jersey, U.S.	
142	Win	128–10–4	Young Chappie	PTS	8	Jul 20, 1937	Canarsie Stadium, New York City, New York, U.S.	
141	Win	127–10–4	Charley Gomer	PTS	8	Jun 7, 1937	Dyckman Oval, New York City, New York, U.S.	
140	Win	126–10–4	Joe Marciente	PTS	8	Jul 2, 1937	Long Beach Stadium, Long Beach, California, U.S.	
139	Win	125–10–4	Al Gillette	TKO	4 (10)	Jun 18, 1937	Ocean View A.A., Long Branch, New Jersey, U.S.	
138	Win	124–10–4	Young Chappie	PTS	8	Jun 15, 1937	Canarsie Stadium, New York City, New York, U.S.	
137	Win	123–10–4	Al Reid	PTS	10	Jun 2, 1937	Hippodrome, New York City, New York, U.S.	
136	Win	122–10–4	Henry Hook	PTS	10	May 25, 1937	Broadway Arena, Brooklyn, New York, U.S.	
135	Win	121–10–4	Frankie Anselm	PTS	10	Apr 9, 1937	Coliseum Arena, New Orleans, Louisiana, U.S.	
134	Win	120–10–4	Allie Tedesco	PTS	8	Mar 27, 1937	Rockland Palace, New York City, New York, U.S.	
133	Win	119–10–4	Joe Woods	KO	1 (8)	Mar 18, 1937	Star Casino, New York City, New York, U.S.	
132	Draw	118–10–4	Bernie Friedkin	PTS	8	Mar 9, 1937	Broadway Arena, Brooklyn, New York, U.S.	
131	Win	118–10–3	Jimmy Lancaster	PTS	6	Feb 27, 1937	Ridgewood Grove, New York City, New York, U.S.	
130	Win	117–10–3	Johnny Mirabella	PTS	8	Jan 28, 1937	Star Casino, New York City, New York, U.S.	
129	Win	116–10–3	Tony Pagano	TKO	4 (8)	Jan 19, 1937	Broadway Arena, Brooklyn, New York, U.S.	
128	Win	115–10–3	Johnny Erickson	TKO	5 (10)	Jan 13, 1937	Arena, New Haven, Connecticut, U.S.	
127	Win	114–10–3	Joe LaFauci	PTS	8	Jan 7, 1937	Star Casino, New York City, New York, U.S.	
126	Win	113–10–3	Al Gillette	PTS	8	Dec 26, 1936	Rockland Palace, New York City, New York, U.S.	
125	Win	112–10–3	Johnny Erickson	PTS	8	Dec 19, 1936	Rockland Palace, New York City, New York, U.S.	
124	Loss	111–10–3	Phil Baker	UD	10	Dec 7, 1935	St. Nicholas Arena, New York City, New York, U.S.	
123	Win	111–9–3	Jose Santos	PTS	10	Sep 19, 1936	Arena Cristal, Havana, Cuba	
122	Win	110–9–3	Joey Brown	PTS	10	Jul 18, 1936	Arena Cristal, Havana, Cuba	
121	Win	109–9–3	Johnny Erickson	PTS	10	Jun 20, 1937	Arena Cristal, Havana, Cuba	
120	Win	108–9–3	Lew Feldman	PTS	10	May 30, 1936	Arena Cristal, Havana, Cuba	
119	Win	107–9–3	Andy Martin	PTS	10	Feb 1, 1936	Arena Cristal, Havana, Cuba	
118	Win	106–9–3	Pelon Guerra	KO	3 (10)	Nov 30, 1935	Arena Polar, Havana, Cuba	
117	Win	105–9–3	Kid Jackson	KO	7 (10)	Sep 3, 1935	Havana, Cuba	
116	Win	104–9–3	Pete Nebo	PTS	10	Jul 4, 1935	Havana, Cuba	
115	Loss	103–9–3	Simon Chavez	PTS	10	Mar 17, 1935	Caracas, Venezuela	
114	Win	103–8–3	Cliff Boykin	KO	5 (10)	Jan 19, 1935	Plaza de Toros, Maracay, Venezuela	
113	Win	102–8–3	Jerry Mazza	PTS	10	Nov 5, 1934	St. Nicholas Arena, New York City, New York, U.S.	
112	Win	101–8–3	Andre Sarilla	KO	7 (10)	Aug 17, 1934	Griffith Stadium, Washington, D.C., U.S.	
111	Win	100–8–3	Buster Brown	PTS	8	Jul 31, 1934	Coney Island Velodrome, New York City, New York, U.S.	
110	Loss	99–8–3	Petey Hayes	UD	10	Jul 11, 1935	Ebbets Field, New York City, New York, U.S.	
109	Win	99–7–3	Johnny Erickson	PTS	10	Jul 6, 1935	Ocean View A.A., Long Branch, New Jersey, U.S.	
108	Win	98–7–3	Frankie Marchese	PTS	10	Jun 28, 1934	Fort Hamilton Arena, New York City, New York, U.S.	
107	Win	97–7–3	Emil Paluso	TKO	7 (10)	May 29, 1934	Bakersfield Arena, Bakersfield, California, U.S.	
106	Draw	96–7–3	Tommy Paul	PTS	10	May 22, 1934	Olympic Auditorium, Los Angeles, California, U.S.	
105	Win	96–7–2	Pete Nebo	PTS	10	May 11, 1934	St. Nicholas Arena, New York City, New York, U.S.	
104	Draw	95–7–2	Bobby Gray	PTS	10	Apr 24, 1934	Forman's Arena, San Jose, California, U.S.	
103	Win	95–7–1	Frankie Wallace	PTS	10	Apr 16, 1934	Civic Auditorium, San Francisco, California, U.S.	
102	Loss	94–7–1	Frankie Klick	TKO	7 (15)	Dec 25, 1933	Arena, Philadelphia, Pennsylvania, U.S.	Lost NBA super featherweight title
101	Win	94–6–1	Frankie Wallace	PTS	10	Dec 4, 1933	Public Hall, Cleveland, Ohio, U.S.	Retained NBA super featherweight title
100	Loss	93–6–1	Tony Canzoneri	KO	2 (10)	Nov 24, 1933	Madison Square Garden, New York City, New York, U.S.	
99	Win	93–5–1	Joe Ghnouly	MD	10	Nov 1, 1933	Forum, Montreal, Quebec, Canada	
98	Win	92–5–1	Nic Bensa	TKO	10 (10)	Sep 29, 1933	Salle Wagram, Paris, Paris, France	
97	Win	91–5–1	Frans Machtens	PTS	10	Aug 2, 1933	Teatro Circo Olympia, Barcelona, Cataluña, Spain	
96	Win	90–5–1	Nic Bensa	PTS	10	Jul 15, 1933	Plaza de Toros de Las Ventas, Madrid, Comunidad de Madrid, Spain	
95	Win	89–5–1	Seaman Tommy Watson	UD	15	May 19, 1933	Madison Square Garden, New York City, New York, U.S.	Retained NBA super featherweight title; Retained NYSAC and The Ring featherweight titles
94	Win	88–5–1	Johnny Farr	UD	10	May 1, 1933	Arena, Philadelphia, Pennsylvania, U.S.	Retained NBA super featherweight title
93	Win	87–5–1	Fidel LaBarba	MD	15	Dec 9, 1932	Madison Square Garden, New York City, New York, U.S.	Retained world super featherweight title; Retained NYSAC and The Ring featherweight titles
92	Win	86–5–1	Johnny Alba	PTS	6	Nov 29, 1932	Jamaica Arena, Jamaica, Queens, New York City, New York, U.S.	
91	Win	85–5–1	Eddie Reilly	PTS	10	Nov 21, 1932	New York Coliseum, New York City, New York, U.S.	
90	Win	84–5–1	Pete Nebo	PTS	10	Nov 14, 1932	St. Nicholas Arena, New York City, New York, U.S.	
89	Win	83–5–1	Lew Feldman	KO	12 (15)	Oct 13, 1932	Madison Square Garden, New York City, New York, U.S.	Retained world super featherweight title; Won vacant NYSAC and The Ring featherweight titles
88	Win	82–5–1	Johnny Farr	PTS	10	Oct 4, 1932	Olympia Stadium, Detroit, Michigan, U.S.	
87	Win	81–5–1	Frank Fariello	PTS	6	Sep 15, 1932	Municipal Stadium, Freeport, New York, U.S.	
86	Win	80–5–1	Steve Smith	UD	10	Sep 6, 1932	Fenway Park, Boston, Massachusetts, U.S.	
85	Win	79–5–1	Frankie Marchese	KO	4 (6)	Sep 1, 1932	Municipal Stadium, Freeport, New York, U.S.	
84	Win	78–5–1	Johnny Farr	PTS	10	Aug 10, 1932	Parkway Arena, Cincinnati, Ohio, U.S.	
83	Win	77–5–1	Eddie Shea	UD	10	Aug 4, 1932	Chicago Stadium, Chicago, Illinois, U.S.	Retained NBA super featherweight title
82	Loss	76–5–1	Jack 'Kid' Berg	MD	15	Jul 18, 1932	Madison Square Garden Bowl, New York City, New York, U.S.	Judges split; Referee voted for Berg
81	Win	76–4–1	Johnny Farr	UD	10	Jun 22, 1932	Meyers Bowl, North Braddock Pennsylvania, U.S.	
80	Win	75–4–1	Roger Bernard	PTS	10	Jun 16, 1932	Baker Bowl, Philadelphia, Pennsylvania, U.S.	
79	Win	74–4–1	Mike Sarko	PTS	10	Jun 6, 1932	Bonacker's Stadium, Rensselaer, New York, U.S.	
78	Win	73–4–1	Lew Feldman	UD	15	Jun 1, 1932	Queensboro Stadium, New York City, New York, U.S.	
77	Win	72–4–1	Steve Smith	PTS	10	May 26, 1932	Belmont Park, Garfield, New Jersey, U.S.	
76	Win	71–4–1	Mike Sarko	PTS	10	May 16, 1932	St. Nicholas Arena, New York City, New York, U.S.	
75	Win	70–4–1	Davey Abad	PTS	15	Apr 10, 1932	Arena Polar, Havana, Cuba	Retained NBA super featherweight title
74	Win	69–4–1	Dominick Petrone	PTS	10	Mar 6, 1932	Viejo Fronton, Havana, Cuba	
73	Win	68–4–1	Maxie Leiner	KO	1 (10)	Nov 30, 1932	St. Nicholas Arena, New York City, New York, U.S.	
72	Loss	67–4–1	Tony Canzoneri	SD	15	Nov 20, 1931	Madison Square Garden, New York City, New York, U.S.	For NYSAC, NBA and The Ring lightweight titles; For world light-welterweight title
71	Win	67–3–1	Lew Feldman	UD	10	Nov 2, 1931	St. Nicholas Arena, New York City, New York, U.S.	
70	Win	66–3–1	Buck Oliva	KO	2 (10)	Oct 26, 1931	Foot Guard Hall, Hartford, Connecticut, U.S.	
69	Win	65–3–1	Al 'Rube' Goldberg	TKO	3 (10)	Oct 21, 1931	Hollywood Arena, Jersey City, New Jersey, U.S.	
68	Win	64–3–1	Steve Smith	PTS	10	Oct 12, 1931	Arena, Trenton, New Jersey, U.S.	
67	Win	63–3–1	Joey Scalfaro	TKO	1 (10)	Oct 1, 1931	Queensboro Stadium, New York City, New York, U.S.	Retained NBA and The Ring super featherweight titles
66	Win	62–3–1	Benny Bass	TKO	7 (10)	Jul 15, 1931	Shibe Park, Philadelphia, Pennsylvania, U.S.	Won NBA and The Ring super featherweight titles
65	Win	61–3–1	Harry Sankey	PTS	10	Jun 29, 1931	Woodcliff Park, Poughkeepsie, New York, U.S.	
64	Win	60–3–1	Maxie Leiner	PTS	10	Jun 17, 1931	Bronx Parkway Arena, White Plains, New York, U.S.	
63	Win	59–3–1	Steve Smith	PTS	10	Jun 12, 1931	White City Stadium, West Haven, Connecticut, U.S.	
62	Win	58–3–1	George Goldberg	TKO	7 (10)	May 29, 1931	Stauch's Arena, New York City, New York, U.S.	
61	Loss	57–3–1	Battling Battalino	UD	15	Dec 12, 1930	Madison Square Garden, New York City, New York, U.S.	For NYSAC, NBA, and The Ring featherweight titles
60	Loss	57–2–1	Fidel LaBarba	UD	10	Nov 3, 1930	Madison Square Garden, New York City, New York, U.S.	
59	Win	57–1–1	Mickey Doyle	KO	1 (10)	Oct 27, 1930	Laurel Garden, Newark, New Jersey, U.S.	
58	Win	56–1–1	Benny Nabors	KO	1 (10)	Oct 16, 1930	Olympia Boxing Club, New York City, New York, U.S.	
57	Loss	55–1–1	Jack 'Kid' Berg	SD	10	Aug 7, 1930	Polo Grounds, New York City, New York, U.S.	
56	Win	55–0–1	Luigi Quadrini	PTS	10	Jul 15, 1930	Queensboro Stadium, New York City, New York, U.S.	
55	Win	54–0–1	Vic Burrone	KO	3 (10)	Jul 10, 1930	Broadway Auditorium, Buffalo, New York, U.S.	
54	Win	53–0–1	Dominick Petrone	TKO	6 (10)	Jul 2, 1930	Ebbets Field, New York City, New York, U.S.	
53	Win	52–0–1	Johnny Erickson	PTS	10	Apr 28, 1930	Coliseum, Toronto, Ontario, Canada	
52	Win	51–0–1	Al Ridgeway	TKO	2 (10)	Mar 21, 1930	Madison Square Garden, New York City, New York, U.S.	
51	Win	50–0–1	Benny Hall	PTS	10	Mar 5, 1930	Plant Field, Tampa, Florida, U.S.	
50	Win	49–0–1	Vic Burrone	PTS	10	Feb 23, 1930	Miramar Garden, Havana, Cuba	
49	Win	48–0–1	Johnny Lawson	KO	2 (10)	Dec 21, 1929	Olympia Boxing Club, New York City, New York, U.S.	
48	Win	47–0–1	Dominick Petrone	PTS	10	Dec 18, 1929	New York Coliseum, New York City, New York, U.S.	
47	Win	46–0–1	Herman Silverberg	KO	1 (10)	Dec 10, 1929	Uptown Lenox S.C., New York City, New York, U.S.	
46	Win	45–0–1	Eddie O'Dowd	KO	2 (10)	Nov 27, 1929	St. Nicholas Arena, New York City, New York, U.S.	
45	Win	44–0–1	Jim El Zaird	PTS	10	Nov 19, 1929	Broadway Arena, Brooklyn, New York, U.S.	
44	Win	43–0–1	Johnny Erickson	PTS	10	Nov 9, 1929	Olympia Boxing Club, New York City, New York, U.S.	
43	Win	42–0–1	Al Singer	SD	12	Aug 29, 1929	Polo Grounds, New York City, New York, U.S.	
42	Win	41–0–1	Tommy Lorenzo	TKO	6 (10)	Aug 7, 1929	Mitchel Field Arena, Mineola, New York, U.S.	
41	Win	40–0–1	Steve Smith	UD	10	Jul 30, 1929	Mills Stadium, Chicago, Illinois, U.S.	
40	Win	39–0–1	Milton Cohen	PTS	10	Jul 19, 1929	Playland Stadium, Rockaway Beach, Queens, New York City, New York, U.S.	
39	Win	38–0–1	Ignacio Fernandez	PTS	10	Jul 10, 1929	Ebbets Field, New York City, New York, U.S.	
38	Win	37–0–1	Jackie Johnston	KO	1 (10)	Jun 24, 1929	Maple Leaf Stadium, Toronto, Ontario, Canada	
37	Win	36–0–1	Terry Roth	TKO	3 (10)	Jun 18, 1929	Queensboro Stadium, New York City, New York, U.S.	
36	Win	35–0–1	Gregorio Vidal	SD	10	Jun 5, 1929	Shibe Park, Philadelphia, Pennsylvania, U.S.	
35	Win	34–0–1	Fidel LaBarba	MD	10	May 22, 1929	New York Coliseum, New York City, New York, U.S.	
34	Win	33–0–1	Steve Smith	UD	10	May 7, 1929	Kingston Armory, Kingston, Pennsylvania, U.S.	
33	Win	32–0–1	Tommy Ryan	KO	1 (10)	Apr 29, 1929	Broadway Arena, Brooklyn, New York, U.S.	
32	Win	31–0–1	Vic Burrone	UD	10	Apr 22, 1929	St. Nicholas Arena, New York City, New York, U.S.	
31	Win	30–0–1	Bushy Graham	DQ	7 (15)	Apr 12, 1929	New York Coliseum, New York City, New York, U.S.	
30	Win	29–0–1	Johnny Vacca	TKO	9 (10)	Mar 22, 1929	Boston Garden, Boston, Massachusetts, U.S.	
29	Win	28–0–1	Al Rackow	KO	4 (10)	Mar 18, 1929	Broadway Auditorium, Buffalo, New York, U.S.	
28	Win	27–0–1	Phil O'Dowd	KO	1 (10)	Mar 9, 1929	Olympia Boxing Club, New York City, New York, U.S.	
27	Win	26–0–1	Chick Suggs	UD	10	Dec 24, 1929	Nuevo Fronton, Havana, Cuba	Won vacant Colored featherweight title
26	Win	25–0–1	Pancho Dencio	TKO	2 (10)	Dec 22, 1928	Olympia Boxing Club, New York City, New York, U.S.	
25	Win	24–0–1	Emil Paluso	TKO	8 (10)	Dec 17, 1928	St. Nicholas Arena, New York City, New York, U.S.	
24	Win	23–0–1	Johnny Helstein	PTS	10	Dec 10, 1928	Broadway Auditorium, Buffalo, New York, U.S.	
23	Draw	22–0–1	Joey Scalfaro	PTS	10	Nov 30, 1928	Madison Square Garden, New York City, New York, U.S.	
22	Win	22–0	Pinky May	TKO	6 (10)	Nov 24, 1928	Olympia Boxing Club, New York City, New York, U.S.	
21	Win	21–0	Jackie Schweitzer	KO	6 (10)	Nov 19, 1928	St. Nicholas Arena, New York City, New York, U.S.	
20	Win	20–0	Pinky Silverberg	PTS	8	Nov 8, 1928	St. Nicholas Arena, New York City, New York, U.S.	
19	Win	19–0	Frisco Grande	TKO	4 (10)	Nov 3, 1928	Olympia Boxing Club, New York City, New York, U.S.	
18	Win	18–0	Joey Ross	KO	1 (10)	Oct 29, 1928	St. Nicholas Arena, New York City, New York, U.S.	
17	Win	17–0	Eddie O'Dowd	PTS	10	Oct 10, 1928	Manhattan Casino, New York City, New York, U.S.	
16	Win	16–0	Johnny Erickson	PTS	10	Oct 1, 1928	St. Nicholas Arena, New York City, New York, U.S.	
15	Win	15–0	Sammy Tisch	PTS	10	sep 17, 1928	St. Nicholas Arena, New York City, New York, U.S.	
14	Win	14–0	Mike Castle	TKO	3 (10)	Aug 31, 1928	Fort Hamilton Arena, New York City, New York, U.S.	
13	Win	13–0	Nick Mercer	KO	3 (8)	Aug 25, 1928	Ridgewood Grove, New York City, New York, U.S.	
12	Win	12–0	Johnny Green	KO	6 (10)	Aug 15, 1928	Mitchel Field Arena, Mineola, New York, U.S.	
11	Win	11–0	Nick DeSalvo	PTS	8	Jul 25, 1928	Mitchel Field Arena, Mineola, New York, U.S.	
10	Win	10–0	Eddie Enos	TKO	3 (8)	Jul 11, 1928	Mitchel Field Arena, Mineola, New York, U.S.	
9	Win	9–0	Pablo Blanco	KO	5 (10)	Jun 16, 1928	Arena Colon, Havana, Cuba	
8	Win	8–0	Jose 'Joe' Castillo	PTS	6	Jun 4, 1928	Havana, Cuba	
7	Win	7–0	Kid Saguita	TKO	5 (10)	May 14, 1928	Gran Stadium, Camaguey, Cuba	
6	Win	6–0	Clemente 'Remache' Morales	TKO	4 (10)	Apr 7, 1928	Arena Colon, Havana, Cuba	
5	Win	5–0	Angel Diaz	KO	7 (10)	Mar 10, 1928	Arena Colon, Havana, Cuba	
4	Win	4–0	Kid Sotolongo	KO	1 (6)	Mar 3, 1928	Arena Colon, Havana, Cuba	
3	Win	3–0	Johnny Cruz	KO	5 (6)	Feb 11, 1928	Arena Colon, Havana, Cuba	
2	Win	2–0	Jose 'Joe' Castillo	PTS	6	Dec 17, 1927	Miramar Garden, Havana, Cuba	
1	Win	1–0	Johnny Cruz	UD	6	Oct 22, 1927	Nuevo Fronton, Havana, Cuba	

== See also ==
- List of super featherweight boxing champions

Achievements
Preceded by Benny Bass	World junior lightweight champion July 15, 1931 – December 25, 1933	Succeeded by Frankie Klick
