= Johnny Farr =

American boxer (1903–1997)

Personal information
- Born: John Farinacci; April 29, 1903 Cleveland, Ohio, U.S.
- Died: October 19, 1997 (aged 94) U.S.
- Height: 5 ft 1 in (155 cm)
- Weight: Bantamweight; Featherweight; Super featherweight Lightweight; Light welterweight

Boxing career

Boxing record
- Total fights: 122
- Wins: 50
- Win by KO: 6
- Losses: 57
- Draws: 15

Johnny Farr (born John Farinacci; April 29, 1903 – October 19, 1997) was an American professional boxer who competed from 1922 to 1934. He was ranked as high as the No. 2 super featherweight contender in the world by The Ring magazine in both April and December 1930. In 1980, Farr was inducted into the Greater Cleveland Sports Hall of Fame.

== Boxing career ==
Despite his modest professional record, Farr consistently faced top-level competition, including opponents who held world titles across six different weight classes, ranging from bantamweight to welterweight, several of whom he fought multiple times throughout his career.

==== Farr vs. Kaplan I ====
Farr was originally scheduled to face reigning world featherweight champion Louis "Kid" Kaplan on February 18, 1925, in the first of their two career meetings, but the bout was postponed to March 11. In an exciting 12-round non-title contest, Kaplan decisively outpointed Farr, flooring him in both the second and tenth rounds with left hooks to the jaw. All 12 newspapermen at ringside agreed that Kaplan had won ten of the 12 rounds.

==== Farr vs. Ray Miller I ====
On May 15, 1925, Farr faced title contender Ray Miller in the first of their two career meetings, outpointing him over ten rounds in the featherweight main event at Legion Stadium in Hollywood.

==== Farr vs. Tremaine ====
On July 28, 1925, Farr faced Carl Tremaine in a scheduled ten-round bout at Taylor Bowl in Newburgh Heights, Ohio, in a contest billed as being for the Cleveland bantamweight championship. In a sensational battle, Tremaine landed the more telling blows, but the referee ruled the bout a draw, much to the displeasure of the crowd, which believed Tremaine had deserved the victory.

==== Farr vs. Bass I ====
On August 11, 1925, Farr faced future NBA featherweight and world super featherweight champion Benny Bass in the first of their six career meetings, losing by newspaper decision after being thoroughly outpointed in a one-sided ten-round contest.

==== Farr vs. McLarnin ====
Farr was originally scheduled to face future NBA bantamweight champion Bud Taylor on March 17, 1926, but Taylor was replaced by future world welterweight champion Jimmy McLarnin, who was making his final appearance as a featherweight. Farr went on to outpoint McLarnin over ten rounds, earning a decision victory.

==== Farr vs. Bass II and III ====
On July 29, 1926, Farr faced Bass in a ten-round rematch at Madison Square Garden. The contest saw little significant action until the sixth round, when Farr opened a cut over Bass's right eye. Bass became the aggressor thereafter, landing several effective right hands in the eighth round before fending off a late rally by Farr in the tenth and final round to secure the decision victory.

After a three-month layoff, Farr faced Bass for the third time on August 10, 1927, at the Olympic Arena in Brooklyn. Bass repeatedly penetrated Farr's guard, landing punches with ease while moving in and out of range, and dominated the contest to earn a unanimous decision victory after winning eight of the ten rounds.

==== Farr vs. Taylor ====
Farr finally faced Taylor on November 8, 1927, in a ten-round bout. Farr repeatedly rocked Taylor with stiff rights and lefts to the head in the early rounds, while Taylor found success in close-range exchanges. The contest remained closely fought through the fifth round, with both fighters exchanging furious blows through the seventh. Farr narrowly edged the eighth, but Taylor rallied in the final two rounds to secure the decision victory.

==== Farr vs. Bass IV ====
On December 9, 1927, Farr faced reigning NBA featherweight champion Bass for the fourth time in a ten-round bout in Detroit, Michigan. Bass pressed the action throughout the contest, consistently landing the cleaner, more effective punches to earn the decision victory.

==== Farr vs. Glick ====
On January 4, 1928, Farr faced veteran title contender Joe Glick in a ten-round super featherweight bout. Despite the fast-paced, continuous exchanges, Glick comfortably outpointed Farr to earn the decision victory.

==== Farr vs. Bass V ====
Farr faced Bass for the fifth time on April 29, 1929, in a featherweight main event in Philadelphia, Pennsylvania. After ten rounds, Bass was awarded a controversial decision victory, despite many ringside experts scoring the majority of the rounds in Farr's favor.

==== Farr vs. Canzoneri I ====
On October 18, 1929, Farr faced former world featherweight champion and future three-division world champion Tony Canzoneri in a lightweight bout, marking the first of their three career meetings. Canzoneri comfortably outboxed Farr through the first seven rounds, exerting little more effort than necessary to maintain control. Despite refusing to retreat throughout the contest, Farr mounted a determined rally in the final three rounds, attacking Canzoneri's body with powerful swings. However, he was unable to overcome Canzoneri's early advantage and lost by unanimous decision.

==== Farr vs. Fuller ====
Farr next faced future world light welterweight title claimant Sammy Fuller on November 29, 1929, losing by decision after being outpointed over ten rounds.

==== Farr vs. Kaplan II ====
On March 17, 1930, Farr faced former world featherweight champion Kaplan in a ten-round lightweight rematch, losing by decision.

==== Farr vs. Canzoneri II ====
Farr faced Canzoneri in a rematch on May 14, 1930, in a slow-paced, uneventful contest that drew frequent boos from the crowd as neither fighter showed much willingness to engage. Canzoneri ultimately earned the decision victory after ten rounds.

==== Farr vs. Freddie Miller I and II ====
On October 2, 1930, Farr faced future world featherweight champion Freddie Miller in a ten-round bout, marking the first of their three career meetings. With both fighters having previously claimed the state title, the bout was billed as a championship contest, with Miller earning the decision victory.

Two fights later, Farr faced Miller in a rematch on November 13, earning a decisive ten-round decision victory in Cincinnati.

==== Farr vs. Ray Miller II ====
Farr faced Miller in a rematch on December 10, 1930, in Cleveland, decisively outpointing him over ten rounds to earn the decision victory. Farr won eight of the ten rounds before what was reportedly the largest crowd ever to attend a boxing event in Cleveland at the time.

==== Farr vs. Canzoneri III ====
Farr faced reigning world lightweight champion Canzoneri for the third and final time on January 26, 1931, in a ten-round non-title bout refereed by former world heavyweight champion Jack Dempsey. Canzoneri established an early lead in a bout that featured occasional bursts of fast-paced exchanges but was otherwise slow at times, prompting Dempsey to intervene on several occasions to encourage more action. Neither fighter scored a knockdown, and Canzoneri ultimately earned the newspaper decision.

==== Farr vs. Freddie Miller III ====
Farr faced Miller for the third and final time on March 26, 1931, losing by decision in a ten-round featherweight bout.

==== Farr vs. Chocolate I, II, and III ====
Farr was scheduled to face reigning NBA super featherweight champion Kid Chocolate in a non-title bout on June 20, 1932, in the first of their four career meetings, but heavy rain forced the bout to be postponed until June 22. Chocolate went on to outpoint Farr over ten rounds, earning a unanimous decision victory.

Farr faced Chocolate in a rematch on August 10, suffering two knockdowns for three-counts in the opening round. Despite absorbing considerable punishment, Farr mounted a spirited effort, repeatedly fighting back and earning applause from the crowd for his resilience. He also managed to stagger Chocolate three times with punches to the head. However, Chocolate floored Farr again for a seven-count in the tenth and final round before securing the decision victory.

Farr faced Chocolate for the third time on October 4, suffering a one-sided defeat over ten rounds. Chocolate knocked Farr down for a seven-count in the fifth round with a left to the face and consistently evaded his attacks. Farr struggled to land any meaningful punches, connecting with barely a dozen solid blows throughout the bout, as Chocolate cruised to a decisive decision victory.

==== Farr vs. Ross I ====
On November 25, 1932, Farr faced future three-division world champion Barney Ross in a scheduled ten-round bout. Ross dominated the contest, flooring Farr four times throughout the fight. Despite mounting a desperate rally in the tenth and final round, Farr was thoroughly outclassed, with Ross earning a unanimous decision victory.

==== Farr vs. Bass VI ====
Farr faced former two-division world champion Bass for the sixth and final time on April 4, 1933, in Philadelphia, losing an eight-round decision after being outpointed.

==== Farr vs. Chocolate IV ====
Farr faced reigning two-division world champion Chocolate for the fourth and final time on May 1, 1933, challenging for his super featherweight title in a ten-round bout. Chocolate reserved much of his most punishing offense for the later rounds, repeatedly connecting with stinging left jabs to the face before flooring Farr three times in the tenth and final round en route to a unanimous decision victory.

==== Farr vs. Ross II ====
Farr faced reigning world lightweight and light welterweight champion Barney Ross in a rematch on July 26, 1933, challenging for the world light welterweight title in a scheduled 12-round bout. Ross dominated from the opening bell, repeatedly battering Farr with powerful rights and lefts, breaking his nose and leaving one eye swollen shut. After Ross decisively won each of the first six rounds, the Missouri boxing commission ordered the bout stopped, awarding him a technical knockout victory.

=== Retirement ===
Farr retired in 1934 with a professional record of 50–57–15, including six victories by knockout. Fighting out of Cleveland, Ohio, for much of his career, he also spent time competing on the Pacific Coast, where he participated in several high-profile bouts in California. Managed at various stages of his career by Eddie Mead and Scotty De Lauer, he was ranked among the world's top ten featherweights in January 1927 by a nationwide consensus of boxing experts. Between October 1928 and September 1931, he was ranked among the world's top ten super featherweight contenders by The Ring magazine, reaching a career-high ranking of No. 2 in both April and December 1930.

== Personal life ==
Farr is of Italian descent. His brother Mickey was also a professional boxer.

== Professional boxing record ==
122 fights	50 wins	57 losses
By knockout	6	3
By decision	44	54
Draws	15	

No.	Result	Record	Opponent	Type	Round, time	Date	Location	Notes
122	Loss	50–57–15	Petey Hayes	PTS	10	Apr 23, 1934	St. Nicholas Arena, New York City, New York, U.S.	
121	Loss	50–56–15	Bucky Burton	PTS	10	Apr 2, 1934	Biscayne Arena, Miami, Florida, U.S.	
120	Win	50–55–15	Eddie Shea	PTS	10	Mar 19, 1934	Biscayne Arena, Miami, Florida, U.S.	
119	Loss	49–55–15	Baby La Paz	PTS	10	Mar 4, 1934	Payret Theatre, Havana, Cuba	
118	Loss	49–54–15	Jimmy Vaughn	PTS	6	Jan 19, 1934	Equestrium, Cleveland, Ohio, U.S.	
117	Loss	49–53–15	Barney Ross	TKO	6/10	Jul 26, 1933	Convention Hall, Kansas City, Missouri, U.S.	For world light welterweight title
116	Loss	49–52–15	Petey Sarron	UD	8	Jun 6, 1933	Portner's Arena, Alexandria, Virginia, U.S.	
115	Loss	49–51–15	Kid Chocolate	UD	10	May 1, 1933	Arena, Philadelphia, Pennsylvania, U.S.	For NBA super featherweight title
114	Loss	49–50–15	Benny Bass	PTS	8	Apr 4, 1933	Olympia A.C., Philadelphia, Pennsylvania, U.S.	
113	Loss	49–49–15	Barney Ross	UD	10	Nov 25, 1932	Auditorium, Milwaukee, Wisconsin, U.S.	
112	Loss	49–48–15	Kid Chocolate	PTS	10	Oct 4, 1932	Olympia Stadium, Detroit, Michigan, U.S.	
111	Loss	49–47–15	Steve Halaiko	PTS	10	Sep 12, 1932	Edgerton Park Arena, Rochester, New York, U.S.	
110	Loss	49–46–15	Kid Chocolate	PTS	10	Aug 10, 1932	Parkway Arena, Cincinnati, Ohio, U.S.	
109	Loss	49–45–15	Chico Cisneros	PTS	8	Jun 24, 1932	Municipal Stadium, Cleveland, Ohio, U.S.	
108	Loss	49–44–15	Kid Chocolate	UD	10	Jun 22, 1932	Meyers Bowl, North Braddock, Pennsylvania, U.S.	
107	Loss	49–43–15	Eddie Shea	NWS	10	May 20, 1932	Auditorium, Minneapolis, Minnesota, U.S.	
106	Win	49–42–15	Santiago Zorrilla	PTS	8	Dec 10, 1931	Public Hall, Cleveland, Ohio, U.S.	
105	Loss	48–42–15	Joe Ghnouly	PTS	10	Dec 3, 1931	Coliseum, St. Louis, Missouri, U.S.	
104	Loss	48–41–15	Tommy Paul	UD	10	Oct 23, 1931	Broadway Auditorium, Buffalo, New York, U.S.	
103	Loss	48–40–15	Frank Bojarski	PTS	10	Sep 11, 1931	Carney Auditorium, Erie, Pennsylvania, U.S.	
102	Loss	48–39–15	Jose Estrada	PTS	12	Aug 11, 1931	Coliseum Arena, New Orleans, Louisiana, U.S.	
101	Draw	48–38–15	Jose Estrada	PTS	10	Jul 28, 1931	Coliseum Arena, New Orleans, Louisiana, U.S.	
100	Loss	48–38–14	Bushy Graham	TKO	8/10	Apr 6, 1931	State Fair Grounds, Columbus, Ohio, U.S.	
99	Loss	48–37–14	Freddie Miller	PTS	10	Mar 26, 1931	Music Hall Arena, Cincinnati, Ohio, U.S.	
98	Win	48–36–14	Johnny Cook	PTS	15	Mar 9, 1931	Coliseum Arena, New Orleans, Louisiana, U.S.	
97	Win	47–36–14	Ervin Berlier	PTS	10	Feb 23, 1931	Coliseum Arena, New Orleans, Louisiana, U.S.	
96	Loss	46–36–14	Tony Canzoneri	NWS	10	Jan 26, 1931	Coliseum Arena, New Orleans, Louisiana, U.S.	
95	Win	46–35–14	Ray Miller	PTS	10	Dec 10, 1930	Public Hall, Cleveland, Ohio, U.S.	
94	Win	45–35–14	Freddie Miller	PTS	10	Nov 13, 1930	Music Hall Arena, Cincinnati, Ohio, U.S.	
93	Draw	44–35–14	Rosey Stoy	PTS	10	Oct 22, 1930	Lancaster, Pennsylvania, U.S.	
92	Loss	44–35–13	Freddie Miller	UD	10	Oct 2, 1930	Ohio National Guard Armory, Cincinnati, Ohio, U.S.	Billed as being for the Ohio State featherweight championship
91	Win	44–34–13	Johnny Cook	PTS	10	Aug 18, 1930	Coliseum Arena, New Orleans, Louisiana, U.S.	
90	Win	43–34–13	Eddie Wolfe	PTS	10	Aug 11, 1930	Coliseum Arena, New Orleans, Louisiana, U.S.	
89	Loss	42–34–13	Andy Callahan	PTS	10	Aug 6, 1930	O'Sullivan Park, Lawrence, Massachusetts, U.S.	
88	Loss	42–33–13	Sammy Dorfman	PTS	10	Jun 11, 1930	Queensboro Stadium, Long Island City, New York, U.S.	
87	Loss	42–32–13	Tony Canzoneri	PTS	10	May 14, 1930	Arena, New Haven, Connecticut, U.S.	
86	Win	42–31–13	Dick Finnegan	PTS	10	Apr 15, 1930	Mechanics Building, Boston, Massachusetts, U.S.	
85	Win	41–31–13	Chico Cisneros	PTS	15	Apr 7, 1930	Coliseum Arena, New Orleans, Louisiana, U.S.	
84	Loss	40–31–13	Louis 'Kid' Kaplan	PTS	10	Mar 18, 1930	Arena, New Haven, Connecticut, U.S.	
83	Draw	40–30–13	Cowboy Eddie Anderson	PTS	10	Mar 10, 1930	Convention Hall, Toledo, Ohio, U.S.	
82	Win	40–30–12	Steve Smith	PTS	10	Jan 28, 1930	South Main Street Armory, Wilkes-Barre, Pennsylvania, U.S.	
81	Loss	39–30–12	Sammy Fuller	PTS	10	Nov 29, 1929	Madison Square Garden, New York City, New York, U.S.	
80	Loss	39–29–12	Tony Canzoneri	UD	10	Oct 18, 1929	Madison Square Garden, New York City, New York, U.S.	
79	Draw	39–28–12	Jose Ramon Diaz	PTS	10	Sep 30, 1929	Arena, Philadelphia, Pennsylvania, U.S.	
78	Draw	39–28–11	Pete Nebo	PTS	10	Sep 18, 1929	Shibe Park, Philadelphia, Pennsylvania, U.S.	
77	Win	39–28–10	Henri Dewancker	PTS	10	Aug 19, 1929	Municipal Stadium, Philadelphia, Pennsylvania, U.S.	
76	Draw	38–28–10	Andy Martin	PTS	10	Jul 15, 1929	Meyers Bowl, North Braddock, Pennsylvania, U.S.	
75	Loss	38–28–9	Ernie Mandell	PTS	10	Jun 12, 1929	Rhode Island Auditorium, Providence, Rhode Island, U.S.	
74	Loss	38–27–9	Young Montreal	PTS	10	Apr 30, 1929	Providence, Rhode Island, U.S.	
73	Loss	38–26–9	Benny Bass	PTS	10	Apr 29, 1929	Arena, Philadelphia, Pennsylvania, U.S.	
72	Win	38–25–9	Rosey Stoy	NWS	10	Apr 16, 1929	Rayen-Wood Auditorium, Youngstown, Ohio, U.S.	
71	Loss	37–25–9	Harry Blitman	NWS	12	Apr 3, 1929	Youngstown, Ohio, U.S.	
70	Loss	37–24–9	Jake Zeramby	PTS	10	Mar 11, 1929	Arena, Boston, Massachusetts, U.S.	
69	Win	37–23–9	Bobby Garcia	RTD	6/12	Feb 20, 1929	Memorial Hall, Dayton, Ohio, U.S.	
68	Loss	36–23–9	Billy Wallace	PTS	10	Dec 4, 1928	Public Hall, Cleveland, Ohio, U.S.	
67	Win	36–22–9	Jimmy Hackley	PTS	12	Oct 22, 1928	Memorial Hall, Dayton, Ohio, U.S.	
66	Win	35–22–9	Young Nationalista	PTS	10	Apr 24, 1928	Stockyards Stadium, Denver, Colorado, U.S.	
65	Loss	34–22–9	Harry Blitman	PTS	10	Mar 30, 1928	Legion Stadium, Hollywood, California, U.S.	
64	Loss	34–21–9	Joe Glick	PTS	12	Jan 4, 1928	Public Hall, Cleveland, Ohio, U.S.	
63	Loss	34–20–9	Benny Bass	PTS	10	Dec 9, 1927	Olympia Stadium, Detroit, Michigan, U.S.	
62	Loss	34–19–9	Bud Taylor	PTS	10	Nov 8, 1927	Olympic Auditorium, Los Angeles, California, U.S.	
61	Draw	34–18–9	Benny 'Kid' Carter	PTS	10	Nov 2, 1927	Auditorium, Oakland, California, U.S.	
60	Loss	34–18–8	Ignacio Fernandez	PTS	10	Sep 9, 1927	Mills Stadium, Chicago, Illinois, U.S.	
59	Loss	34–17–8	Benny Bass	UD	10	Aug 10, 1927	Olympic Arena, Brooklyn, New York, U.S.	
58	Loss	34–16–8	Frankie Gruber	NWS	6	May 12, 1927	Auditorium, Saint Paul, Minnesota, U.S.	
57	Win	34–15–8	Johnny Hill	PTS	12	May 10, 1927	Public Hall, Cleveland, Ohio, U.S.	
56	Win	33–15–8	Johnny Hill	PTS	12	Apr 19, 1927	Public Hall, Cleveland, Ohio, U.S.	
55	Win	32–15–8	Babe Herman	PTS	12	Mar 9, 1927	Public Hall, Cleveland, Ohio, U.S.	
54	Loss	31–15–8	Eddie Shea	PTS	12	Feb 16, 1927	Public Hall, Cleveland, Ohio, U.S.	
53	Win	31–14–8	Eddie Shea	PTS	12	Dec 2, 1926	Public Hall, Cleveland, Ohio, U.S.	
52	Win	30–14–8	Johnny Datto	PTS	12	Nov 12, 1926	Public Hall, Cleveland, Ohio, U.S.	
51	Win	29–14–8	Chick Suggs	PTS	12	Aug 12, 1926	Taylor Bowl, Newburgh Heights, Ohio, U.S.	
50	Loss	28–14–8	Benny Bass	PTS	10	Jul 29, 1926	Madison Square Garden, New York City, New York, U.S.	
49	Loss	28–13–8	Eddie Shea	PTS	10	May 12, 1926	Olympic Auditorium, Los Angeles, California, U.S.	
48	Win	28–12–8	Pete Sarmiento	PTS	12	Apr 13, 1926	Public Hall, Cleveland, Ohio, U.S.	
47	Win	27–12–8	Jimmy McLarnin	PTS	10	Mar 17, 1926	Olympic Auditorium, Los Angeles, California, U.S.	
46	Win	26–12–8	Vic Foley	DQ	8/10	Feb 12, 1926	Dreamland Rink, San Francisco, California, U.S.	
45	Win	25–12–8	Vic King	TKO	5/10	Jan 27, 1926	Auditorium, Oakland, California, U.S.	
44	Win	24–12–8	Joey Sangor	PTS	10	Dec 30, 1925	Olympic Auditorium, Los Angeles, California, U.S.	
43	Loss	23–12–8	Babe Herman	NWS	10	Sep 22, 1925	Taylor Bowl, Newburgh Heights, Ohio, U.S.	
42	Loss	23–11–8	Benny Bass	NWS	10	Aug 11, 1925	Taylor Bowl, Newburgh Heights, Ohio, U.S.	
41	Draw	23–10–8	Carl Tremaine	PTS	10	Jul 28, 1925	Taylor Bowl, Newburgh Heights, Ohio, U.S.	Advertised as being for the bantamweight championship of Cleveland
40	Win	23–10–7	Danny Kramer	NWS	10	Jun 30, 1925	Taylor Bowl, Newburgh Heights, Ohio, U.S.	
39	Win	22–10–7	Ray Miller	PTS	10	May 15, 1925	Legion Stadium, Hollywood, California, U.S.	
38	Win	21–10–7	Stewart McLean	PTS	10	Apr 8, 1925	Auditorium, Oakland, California, U.S.	
37	Loss	20–10–7	Louis 'Kid' Kaplan	NWS	12	Mar 11, 1925	Auditorium, Oakland, California, U.S.	
36	Win	20–9–7	Dynamite Joe Murphy	PTS	10	Jan 7, 1925	Auditorium, Oakland, California, U.S.	
35	Win	19–9–7	Alex McDonald	KO	1/4	Nov 28, 1924	Dreamland Rink, San Francisco, California, U.S.	
34	Win	18–9–7	Kid Louie	TKO	3/4	Nov 21, 1924	Dreamland Rink, San Francisco, California, U.S.	
33	Draw	17–9–7	Dynamite Joe Murphy	PTS	4	Oct 22, 1924	Auditorium, Oakland, California, U.S.	
32	Win	17–9–6	Tiger Jack Burns	PTS	4	Sep 24, 1924	Auditorium, Oakland, California, U.S.	
31	Win	16–9–6	Tiger Jack Burns	PTS	4	Jul 30, 1924	Auditorium, Oakland, California, U.S.	
30	Win	15–9–6	Tiger Jack Burns	MD	4	Jul 2, 1924	Auditorium, Oakland, California, U.S.	
29	Win	14–9–6	Eddie Macy	PTS	4	Jun 11, 1924	Auditorium, Oakland, California, U.S.	
28	Win	13–9–6	George Spencer	PTS	4	May 29, 1924	San Jose, California, U.S.	
27	Loss	12–9–6	Jack Nash	KO	1/4	May 12, 1924	Eagles Club, Kelso, Washington, U.S.	
26	Loss	12–8–6	Mike Dundee	PTS	4	Mar 19, 1924	Auditorium, Oakland, California, U.S.	
25	Loss	12–7–6	Stewart McLean	PTS	4	Feb 22, 1924	Auditorium, Oakland, California, U.S.	
24	Loss	12–6–6	Vic Foley	PTS	4	Jan 23, 1924	Auditorium, Oakland, California, U.S.	
23	Loss	12–5–6	Bud Hamilton	PTS	4	Jan 1, 1924	Auditorium, Oakland, California, U.S.	
22	Loss	12–4–6	Teddy Silva	PTS	4	Dec 12, 1923	Auditorium, Oakland, California, U.S.	
21	Draw	12–3–6	Stewart McLean	PTS	4	Nov 29, 1923	Auditorium, Oakland, California, U.S.	
20	Draw	12–3–5	Vic Foley	PTS	6	Nov 13, 1923	Crystal Pool, Seattle, Washington, U.S.	
19	Win	12–3–4	Teddy Silva	KO	4	Nov 7, 1923	Auditorium, Oakland, California, U.S.	
18	Win	11–3–4	Midget Smith	PTS	4	Oct 3, 1923	Auditorium, Oakland, California, U.S.	
17	Win	10–3–4	Jack Sharkey	PTS	4	Aug 15, 1923	Auditorium, Oakland, California, U.S.	
16	Loss	9–3–4	Teddy Silva	PTS	4	Jul 6, 1923	Legion Stadium, Hollywood, California, U.S.	
15	Draw	9–2–4	Dynamite Joe Murphy	PTS	4	Jul 4, 1923	Oaks Ballpark, Emeryville, California, U.S.	
14	Win	9–2–3	California Joe Lynch	PTS	4	Jun 20, 1923	Auditorium, Oakland, California, U.S.	
13	Win	8–2–3	California Joe Lynch	PTS	4	Jun 6, 1923	Auditorium, Oakland, California, U.S.	
12	Win	7–2–3	Eddie Macy	PTS	4	May 29, 1923	Auditorium, Oakland, California, U.S.	
11	Win	6–2–3	Sammy Compagno	PTS	4	May 9, 1923	Auditorium, Oakland, California, U.S.	
10	Loss	5–2–3	Sammy Compagno	PTS	4	May 2, 1923	Auditorium, Oakland, California, U.S.	
9	Draw	5–1–3	California Joe Lynch	PTS	4	Apr 18, 1923	Auditorium, Oakland, California, U.S.	
8	Win	5–1–2	California Joe Lynch	PTS	4	Mar 28, 1923	Auditorium, Oakland, California, U.S.	
7	Draw	4–1–2	Terio Vargas	PTS	4	Mar 14, 1923	Auditorium, Oakland, California, U.S.	
6	Draw	4–1–1	Terio Vargas	PTS	4	Feb 28, 1923	Auditorium, Oakland, California, U.S.	
5	Win	4–1–0	Dick Griffin	PTS	4	Feb 16, 1923	Dreamland Rink, San Francisco, California, U.S.	
4	Loss	3–1–0	Sammy Compagno	PTS	4	Feb 2, 1923	Dreamland Rink, San Francisco, California, U.S.	
3	Win	3–0–0	Teddy Seidman	PTS	4	Jan 19, 1923	Dreamland Rink, San Francisco, California, U.S.	
2	Win	2–0–0	Sailor Bernardo	PTS	4	Oct 13, 1922	Legion Stadium, Hollywood, California, U.S.	
1	Win	1–0–0	Young Monroe	KO	4	Sep 22, 1922	Legion Stadium, Hollywood, California, U.S.	

== See also ==
- List of male boxers
