= Benny Bass =

American boxer (1904–1975)

Personal information
- Nickname: Little Fish
- Nationality: American
- Born: Benjamin Baruch J. Bass; December 4, 1904 Kyiv, Russian Empire (modern-day Ukraine)
- Died: June 25, 1975 (aged 70) Philadelphia, Pennsylvania, U.S.
- Height: 5 ft 1 1/2 in (1.56 m)
- Weight: Featherweight; Lightweight

Boxing career
- Reach: 64 in (163 cm)
- Stance: Orthodox

Boxing record
- Total fights: 243
- Wins: 190
- Win by KO: 72
- Losses: 41
- Draws: 10
- No contests: 2

Benjamin "Benny" Baruch J. Bass (December 4, 1904 – June 25, 1975), known as "Little Fish", was an American boxer. He was born in Kyiv, Ukraine, with his family emigrating to the United States in 1906; choosing to settle in Philadelphia, Pennsylvania. Bass was a World Featherweight Champion and Undisputed World Super Featherweight Champion during his career. Statistical boxing website BoxRec lists Bass as the #17 ranked lightweight of all time. He was inducted into the International Jewish Sports Hall of Fame in 1994 and the International Boxing Hall of Fame in 2002. Strongly built with muscular shoulders, Bass's signature punch was a powerful left hook to the midsection, and he enjoyed fighting on the inside, a frequent requirement from his relative lack of reach.

== Early life and amateur career ==
Bass was born in Kyiv, Russian Empire on December 4, 1904, the second son to Jewish parents Jacob and Pauline and was brought to America three years later. His father first came to Philadelphia to earn enough money to send for his five sons and wife in Kyiv. They sailed to America but were first rescued from a shipwreck on their way, spending five weeks in Queenstown, Ireland. By ten, he was making a living selling newspapers at a busy street corner in Philadelphia. In his early teens, Benny held down a job at Curtis Publishing Company, who published The Saturday Evening Post. From age twelve to sixteen, Bass won 95 of 100 bouts as an amateur. Impressively, he qualified for the Olympic Trials in the Flyweight Class in 1920, where he lost a decision to the future Gold Medal winner Frankie Genaro. Turning pro the following year, he was managed by Phil Glassman. By 1926, he was rated the number one featherweight contender.

In an important early career bout, Bass defeated Johnny Dixon, a leading featherweight contender, in a ten-round newspaper decision on August 30, 1923.

On January 11, 1926, Bass defeated Leo "Kid" Roy, in a ten-round points decision in Philadelphia. In an action filled bout, Roy held a slight lead through the first five rounds. Roy may have taken the sixth and eighth. The fighting was particularly fierce in the ninth and tenth, with both boxers swapping punches at close range, but Bass had acquired enough points in the last five rounds to take the decision.

Before an impressive crowd of 20,000, in one of his most important early wins, Bass defeated highly rated featherweight contender Babe Herman on September 1, 1926 in a ten-round points decision at Shibe Park in Philadelphia. In a raucous battle, Bass dropped Herman to the canvas in five instances, with three times in the second for counts of nine, two, and nine, once in the third for a count of seven, and once in the tenth for a count of six where Herman could have risen earlier. Herman's need to fight a defensive battle marred the bout with frequent instances of clinching. His opponent threw several looping rights, but Bass was usually able to come inside of them as an effective defense. Several times Herman's right did connect with jaw and body at close quarters, but Bass weathered the blows quickly. Herman threw a right in the second, followed almost instantaneously from a left from Bass that sent both boxers to the canvas, though Bass recovered more quickly and was on his feet. Herman took a count of nine on one knee. At 5'4", with a two-inch advantage in height, Herman likely benefited from a slight reach advantage, but Bass tended to do well against boxers with slight advantages in reach.

Early in his career on June 27, 1927, Bass defeated Jewish New York boxer Joe Glick in a ten-round points decision at Shibe Park in Philadelphia. Bass sent Glick to the canvas twice in the fifth, once for a count of eight. Respecting each other's abilities, and suffering from fatigue, the match was marked by frequent clinching. Several times in later rounds Glick was staggered by Bass's punches but managed to stay on his feet.

== Taking the NBA world feather title, 1927 ==
On September 12, 1927, Bass defeated Jewish boxer Red Chapman (Morris Kaplan) before an extraordinary crowd of 30,000 in Philadelphia for the NBA world featherweight championship in a ten-round unanimous decision. In the fourth through seventh, Bass managed to fight from a distance using his long game to prevent Chapman from opening a swollen cut on his eye opened in the third round. Bass led a two fisted slugging attack in the seventh, eighth, and ninth, that gained him a points margin and won him the decision of all three judges. In the early ninth, an unusual sight occurred, when both boxers charged each other, landing rights to their jaws and were knocked to the canvas simultaneously. Bass recovered more quickly, but Chapman took a count of eight before resuming the bout.

=== Losing world feather title, 1928 ===
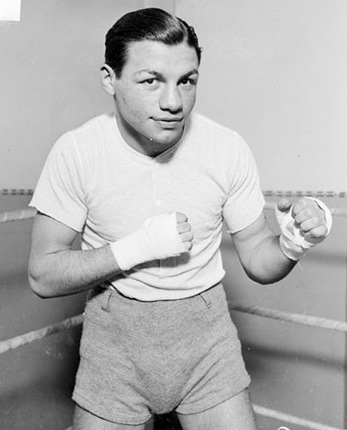
Champion Tony Canzoneri

Bass lost the world featherweight title to Tony Canzoneri on February 10, 1928 at Madison Square Garden in a fifteen-round split decision, with Bass sustaining a break to his right collarbone from a left to the jaw at the end of the third round that landed him hard on the canvas, causing the collarbone damage. Bass inflicted some severe body punishment during the fight, but Canzoneri eased ahead on points after Bass's knockdown in the third that resulted in his injury.

Bass defeated Jewish Philadelphian boxer Harry Blitman before a crowd of 24,000 on September 10, 1928 in a sixth-round knockout at Shibe Park in Philadelphia. Blitman was considered a leading contender for the world featherweight crown, and the bout was billed as a USA Pennsylvania State Featherweight Title. Bass put Bitman to the canvas in the sixth with a series of hard rights, and had scored a knockdown for a count of seven in the second round.

He defeated former Junior Lightweight Champion Mike Ballerino, in a fast ten round points decision on October 17, 1927. "Bass, who was outweighed by seven pounds punched hard and accounted for a knockdown in the fourth round but Ballerino was up at the count of eight".

== Taking world jr. lightweight title, 1929 ==
Bass would first take the World Junior Lightweight Championship before a crowd of 9,000 by defeating Tod Morgan on December 20, 1929 at New York's famed Madison Square Garden. Morgan, who had held the title for four years, opened the first round with power, and mounted a first round bombardment that left Bass somewhat groggy and weak. Bass, who was a 3-1 favorite completed the first round reeling and dizzy from several strong straight right hand shots to the chin from Morgan. The knockout occurred from two sweeping right hand punches from Bass, only fifty-one seconds into the second round. The first right, almost at the opening bell, put Morgan to the canvas for a count of nine. After Morgan rose after the count, Bass put him down with the final right to the chin that ended the bout.

Bass first defended the title on February 3, 1930, against Davey Abad in a fourth-round technical knockout in St. Louis. According to the New York Times, Bass floored Abad four times in the fourth round. Abad was down twice in the first round from lefts by Bass, though he appeared to win by a shade in both the second and third rounds.

Although he could only lose his title by knockout, Bass lost to Italian boxer Eddie Shea, before a considerable crowd of 16,000, in a world jr. lightweight title bout in St. Louis, in a ten-round newspaper decision on March 28, 1930. Shea had a significant reach advantage, and a six-inch advantage in height. In the opening of the fifth round, Bass sent Shea to the canvas for a nine count. In the opening of the seventh, in a close bout, Shea crashed a hook to Bass's jaw that sent him to the canvas for a nine count as well. Shea was the aggressor through much of the fight, and in the opinion of many ringside observers, won the no decision bout on points. Shea used a strong left hook to counter the effective right of Bass. Bass later defeated Shea in a second-round knockout in Atlantic City on August 31, 1934, that became one of Shea's last bouts before boxing retirement. Bass put Shea to the canvas in the second round with a right to the chin that put Shea down for the count, and left him unable to rise immediately afterwards.

Bass defeated future world light welterweight champion, Johnny Jadick on December 8, 1930 in a ten-round unanimous decision in Philadelphia. The referee called the third, fourth, and fifth even, but gave the other seven rounds to Bass who came close to knocking out his opponent. Jadick may have looked best in the fourth where he put his reach advantage to good use, enjoying a nearly five inch advantage in height as well.

Bass defeated Lew Massey on January 5, 1931 before a near capacity crowd of 10,000 in a ten-round newspaper decision for the world junior lightweight title at the Arena in Philadelphia. Bass landed a fusillade of punches to the body that weakened his opponent, who had to use his best defenses to avoid a knockout in the closing rounds. In the first three rounds, Massey made a better start, taking them by a shade against his opponent and scoring occasionally with lefts and rights that jarred but did not deter Bass. In the closing rounds, both boxers showed fatigue, and clinched frequently in a defensive move. Leading most of the way, scorers gave Bass seven of the ten rounds, with two to Massey and one even.

Bass defeated Bud Taylor in Philadelphia in a second-round technical knockout on February 16, 1931 in what would have been a ten-round bout. Bass appeared to take the first round with sheer aggressiveness. Taylor was winning the second round with smashes to head and body, before Bass fought back and landed what appeared by many to be a low blow to the midruff. Because the crowd and Taylor believed the blow that ended the bout was a low foul, the crowd was greatly displeased with the call for the technical knockout, though it made Bass one of only two men to ever knock Taylor out. Oddly, the referee instructed the boxers to continue boxing an exhibition for the next five rounds to satisfy the crowd, and both boxers complied.

Bass defeated Eddie Mack on May 4, 1931 at the arena in Philadelphia by knockout with a crushing right to the right side of the chin that broke Mack's lower right jaw in the third round.

=== Losing world junior light title, 1931 ===
Bass lost the world junior lightweight title on July 15, 1931 before a large crowd of 15,000, to black Cuban boxer Kid Chocolate in a technical knockout, 2:58 into the seventh round in Philadelphia. Chocolate battered Bass with rapid fire flurries of lefts and rights through six rounds, and though Bass connected several times with blows that stung Chocolate and made him hold, the Cuban boxer maintained a comfortable margin on points, finally ending the bout in the seventh with rights and lefts to the head and face. When Chocolate cornered Bass against the ropes in the seventh, the referee called the bout without a knockdown having occurred.

On April 14, 1932, Bass knocked out Micky Doyle early in the second round in Wilmington, Delaware. Doyle was first down from a right to the jaw for a count of nine, and then when Doyle resumed the match, Bass ended it for good.

Before a crowd of 20,000, near the end of his career on July 27, 1937, Bass lost to the incomparable black boxer Henry Armstrong in a knockout from a looping right had punch, 2:35 into the fourth round at the Baker Bowl in Philadelphia. Armstrong would become a world champion in three weight divisions in his career. Armstrong penetrated Bass's defenses with high rights almost at will throughout the bout. At 32, Bass was no match for Armstrong, though he managed to stay on his feet until the fourth.

== Life after boxing ==
Retiring from the ring in 1940, he worked as a liquor and beer salesman for Penn Beer Distributors in the Philadelphia area until 1960, when he became a clerk in Philadelphia Traffic Court. On June 25, 1975, Bass died at 70 at Rolling Hills hospital in Philadelphia where he had been a patient for several months. He had suffered from heart complications. He left a wife, daughter, three children, and a great grandchild. He had been married a total of three times. He is enshrined in the Pennsylvania Boxing Hall of Fame.

== Professional boxing record ==
All information in this section is derived from BoxRec, unless otherwise stated.

=== Official record ===
243 fights	158 wins	29 losses
By knockout	72	2
By decision	83	20
By disqualification	3	7
Draws	6	
No contests	2	
Newspaper decisions/draws	48	

All newspaper decisions are officially regarded as "no decision" bouts and are not counted in the win/loss/draw column.

No.	Result	Record	Opponent	Type	Round	Date	Location	Notes
243	Loss	158–29–6 (50)	Tommy Speigal	UD	10	May 7, 1940	Convention Hall, Philadelphia, Pennsylvania, U.S.	For USA Pennsylvania State lightweight title
242	Loss	158–28–6 (50)	Jimmy Tygh	MD	10	Apr 8, 1940	Convention Hall, Philadelphia, Pennsylvania, U.S.	
241	Draw	158–27–6 (50)	Jimmy Tygh	PTS	10	Mar 4, 1940	Convention Hall, Philadelphia, Pennsylvania, U.S.	
240	Win	158–27–5 (50)	Norman Rahn	KO	1 (10)	Feb 2, 1940	Cambria A.C., Philadelphia, Pennsylvania, U.S.	
239	Win	157–27–5 (50)	Tony Sarullo	PTS	8	Jan 22, 1940	Convention Hall, Philadelphia, Pennsylvania, U.S.	
238	Win	156–27–5 (50)	Norman Rahn	UD	10	Oct 13, 1939	Cambria A.C., Philadelphia, Pennsylvania, U.S.	
237	Win	155–27–5 (50)	Young Chappie	KO	2 (10)	Aug 10, 1939	Cambria Stadium, Philadelphia, Pennsylvania, U.S.	
236	Loss	154–27–5 (50)	Henry Armstrong	KO	4 (10)	Jul 27, 1937	National League Park, Philadelphia, Pennsylvania, U.S.	
235	Win	154–26–5 (50)	Tommy Cross	SD	10	Jun 15, 1937	National League Park, Philadelphia, Pennsylvania, U.S.	
234	Win	153–26–5 (50)	Gene Gallotto	UD	10	Apr 16, 1937	Cambria A.C., Philadelphia, Pennsylvania, U.S.	
233	Win	152–26–5 (50)	Johnny Cabello	KO	2 (10)	Apr 8, 1937	Olympia A.C., Philadelphia, Pennsylvania, U.S.	
232	Win	151–26–5 (50)	Charley Gomer	PTS	10	Mar 18, 1937	Olympia A.C., Philadelphia, Pennsylvania, U.S.	
231	Win	150–26–5 (50)	Andy Bundy	PTS	10	Mar 12, 1937	Cambria A.C., Philadelphia, Pennsylvania, U.S.	
230	Win	149–26–5 (50)	Gene Gallotto	PTS	10	Feb 5, 1937	Cambria A.C., Philadelphia, Pennsylvania, U.S.	
229	Win	148–26–5 (50)	Freddie 'Red' Cochrane	PTS	10	Jan 22, 1937	Cambria A.C., Philadelphia, Pennsylvania, U.S.	
228	Win	147–26–5 (50)	Joey Allen	PTS	10	Jan 14, 1937	Olympia A.C., Philadelphia, Pennsylvania, U.S.	
227	Win	146–26–5 (50)	Joey Zodda	KO	1 (10)	Dec 18, 1936	Cambria A.C., Philadelphia, Pennsylvania, U.S.	
226	Win	145–26–5 (50)	Dave Finn	PTS	10	Dec 4, 1936	Cambria A.C., Philadelphia, Pennsylvania, U.S.	
225	Win	144–26–5 (50)	Johnny Craven	TKO	2 (10)	Dec 25, 1935	Arena, Philadelphia, Pennsylvania, U.S.	
224	Win	143–26–5 (50)	Charley Burns	PTS	10	Dec 6, 1935	Cambria A.C., Philadelphia, Pennsylvania, U.S.	
223	Loss	142–26–5 (50)	Jack Portney	PTS	10	Nov 11, 1935	Carlin's Park, Baltimore, Maryland, U.S.	
222	Win	142–25–5 (50)	George Gibbs	PTS	10	Oct 11, 1935	Cambria A.C., Philadelphia, Pennsylvania, U.S.	
221	Win	141–25–5 (50)	Mike Marshall	PTS	10	Aug 27, 1935	Open Air Arena, Leiperville, Pennsylvania, U.S.	
220	Win	140–25–5 (50)	Johnny Craven	PTS	10	Aug 21, 1935	Carnival Park, West Manayunk, Pennsylvania, U.S.	
219	Loss	139–25–5 (50)	Jimmy Leto	PTS	10	Jul 29, 1935	South Park Arena, Hartford, Connecticut, U.S.	
218	Win	139–24–5 (50)	Johnny Craven	PTS	10	Jul 26, 1935	Carnival Park, West Manayunk, Pennsylvania, U.S.	
217	Win	138–24–5 (50)	Frankie Wallace	SD	8	Jul 23, 1935	Maple Grove Field House, Lancaster, Pennsylvania, U.S.	
216	Win	137–24–5 (50)	Mose Butch	SD	10	May 27, 1935	Hickey Park, Millvale, Pennsylvania, U.S.	
215	Win	136–24–5 (50)	Tony Falco	MD	10	Apr 29, 1935	Arena, Philadelphia, Pennsylvania, U.S.	
214	Win	135–24–5 (50)	Mike Marshall	PTS	10	Apr 14, 1935	Cambria A.C., Philadelphia, Pennsylvania, U.S.	
213	Win	134–24–5 (50)	Mike Marshall	PTS	10	Mar 22, 1935	Cambria A.C., Philadelphia, Pennsylvania, U.S.	
212	Loss	133–24–5 (50)	Eddie Cool	MD	10	Feb 18, 1935	Arena, Philadelphia, Pennsylvania, U.S.	
211	Win	133–23–5 (50)	Jimmy Brady	PTS	10	Dec 25, 1934	Laurel Garden, Newark, New Jersey, U.S.	
210	Win	132–23–5 (50)	Baby Kid Chocolate	TKO	2 (8)	Dec 20, 1934	Convention Hall, Atlantic City, New Jersey, U.S.	
209	Win	131–23–5 (50)	Frankie Wallace	PTS	10	Dec 3, 1934	Convention Hall, Philadelphia, Pennsylvania, U.S.	
208	Loss	130–23–5 (50)	Petey Sarron	MD	10	Sep 24, 1934	Arena, Philadelphia, Pennsylvania, U.S.	
207	Win	130–22–5 (50)	Eddie Shea	KO	2 (10)	Aug 31, 1934	Bader Field, Atlantic City, New Jersey, U.S.	
206	Loss	129–22–5 (50)	Petey Sarron	DQ	6 (10)	Aug 27, 1934	Griffith Stadium, Washington, D.C., U.S.	
205	Win	129–21–5 (50)	Johnny Jadick	PTS	10	Jul 31, 1934	Baker Bowl, Philadelphia, Pennsylvania, U.S.	
204	Loss	128–21–5 (50)	Cleto Locatelli	SD	10	Apr 30, 1934	Convention Hall, Philadelphia, Pennsylvania, U.S.	
203	Win	128–20–5 (50)	Jimmy Leto	RTD	2 (10)	Apr 9, 1934	Arena, Philadelphia, Pennsylvania, U.S.	
202	Draw	127–20–5 (50)	Cleto Locatelli	PTS	10	Mar 12, 1934	Arena, Philadelphia, Pennsylvania, U.S.	
201	Win	127–20–4 (50)	Eddie Cool	SD	10	Dec 27, 1933	Convention Hall, Philadelphia, Pennsylvania, U.S.	Won vacant USA Pennsylvania State lightweight title
200	Win	126–20–4 (50)	Stumpy Jacobs	PTS	8	Oct 2, 1933	Waltz Dream Arena, Atlantic City, New Jersey, U.S.	
199	Loss	125–20–4 (50)	Davey Abad	DQ	7 (10)	Sep 4, 1933	Buffalo Stadium, Houston, Texas, U.S.	
198	Win	125–19–4 (50)	Stumpy Jacobs	PTS	8	Aug 30, 1933	Arena, Virginia Beach, Virginia, U.S.	
197	Win	124–19–4 (50)	Jack Portney	KO	2 (10)	Aug 21, 1933	Convention Hall, Atlantic City, New Jersey, U.S.	
196	Win	123–19–4 (50)	Buster Brown	PTS	10	Aug 7, 1933	Convention Hall, Atlantic City, New Jersey, U.S.	
195	Win	122–19–4 (50)	Buster Brown	PTS	10	May 22, 1933	Carlin's Park, Baltimore, Maryland, U.S.	
194	Win	121–19–4 (50)	Jackie Willis	PTS	8	Apr 17, 1933	Waltz Dream Arena, Atlantic City, New Jersey, U.S.	
193	Win	120–19–4 (50)	Johnny Farr	PTS	8	Apr 4, 1933	Olympia A.C., Philadelphia, Pennsylvania, U.S.	
192	Win	119–19–4 (50)	Joe Ghnouly	MD	10	Mar 8, 1933	Arena, Saint Louis, Missouri, U.S.	
191	Win	118–19–4 (50)	Phil Zwick	PTS	10	Feb 22, 1933	Olympia A.C., Philadelphia, Pennsylvania, U.S.	
190	Win	117–19–4 (50)	Sid Lampe	KO	2 (8)	Jan 27, 1933	Madison Square Garden, New York City, New York, U.S.	
189	Win	116–19–4 (50)	Dominick Petrone	TKO	3 (10)	Dec 12, 1932	St. Nicholas Arena, New York City, New York, U.S.	
188	Win	115–19–4 (50)	Eddie Reilly	KO	1 (10)	Dec 5, 1932	St. Nicholas Arena, New York City, New York, U.S.	
187	Win	114–19–4 (50)	Tony Falco	PTS	10	Sep 12, 1932	Convention Hall, Philadelphia, Pennsylvania, U.S.	
186	Win	113–19–4 (50)	Young Patsy Wallace	PTS	10	Aug 26, 1932	Atlantic City Auditorium, Atlantic City, New Jersey, U.S.	
185	Win	112–19–4 (50)	Ernie Ratner	PTS	10	Jul 25, 1932	Thompson's Stadium, Staten Island, New York City, New York, U.S.	
184	Draw	111–19–4 (50)	Harry Carlton	PTS	10	Jun 7, 1932	Oakland Outdoor Arena, Jersey City, New Jersey, U.S.	
183	Win	111–19–3 (50)	Harry Dublinsky	SD	10	May 25, 1932	Arena Stadium, Philadelphia, Pennsylvania, U.S.	
182	Win	110–19–3 (50)	Young Zazzarino	KO	5 (10)	Apr 15, 1932	Hollywood Arena, Jersey City, New Jersey, U.S.	
181	Win	109–19–3 (50)	Mickey Doyle	KO	2 (8)	Apr 14, 1932	Auditorium, Wilmington, Delaware, U.S.	
180	Loss	108–19–3 (50)	Frank Bojarski	DQ	3 (10)	Mar 14, 1932	Motor Square Garden, Pittsburgh, Pennsylvania, U.S.	
179	Loss	108–18–3 (50)	Wesley Ramey	UD	10	Mar 9, 1932	Coliseum, Saint Louis, Missouri, U.S.	
178	Win	108–17–3 (50)	Prince Saunders	KO	7 (10)	Dec 25, 1931	Arena, Philadelphia, Pennsylvania, U.S.	
177	Win	107–17–3 (50)	Sid Lampe	KO	3 (10)	Dec 18, 1931	Auditorium, Wilmington, Delaware, U.S.	
176	Loss	106–17–3 (50)	Jackie Pilkington	DQ	5 (10)	Nov 30, 1931	Arena, Philadelphia, Pennsylvania, U.S.	Bass was disqualified for punching low
175	Loss	106–16–3 (50)	Kid Chocolate	TKO	7 (10)	Jul 15, 1931	Shibe Park, Philadelphia, Pennsylvania, U.S.	Lost NBA and The Ring junior-lightweight titles
174	Win	106–15–3 (50)	Georgie Day	TKO	2 (10)	Jun 26, 1931	Convention Hall, Atlantic City, New Jersey, U.S.	
173	Win	105–15–3 (50)	Eddie Mack	KO	3 (10)	May 4, 1931	Arena, Philadelphia, Pennsylvania, U.S.	
172	Win	104–15–3 (50)	Young Joe Firpo	PTS	10	Apr 13, 1931	Arena, Philadelphia, Pennsylvania, U.S.	
171	Loss	103–15–3 (50)	Young Joe Firpo	PTS	10	Mar 30, 1931	Arena, Philadelphia, Pennsylvania, U.S.	
170	Win	103–14–3 (50)	Bud Taylor	TKO	2 (10)	Feb 16, 1931	Arena, Philadelphia, Pennsylvania, U.S.	
169	Win	102–14–3 (50)	Lew Massey	UD	10	Jan 5, 1931	Arena, Philadelphia, Pennsylvania, U.S.	Retained NBA and The Ring junior-lightweight titles
168	Win	101–14–3 (50)	Johnny Jadick	UD	10	Dec 8, 1930	Arena, Philadelphia, Pennsylvania, U.S.	
167	Win	100–14–3 (50)	Al Bryant	UD	10	Dec 2, 1930	Manhattan Auditorium, Allentown, Pennsylvania, U.S.	
166	Win	99–14–3 (50)	Bud Mangino	UD	10	Nov 24, 1930	Arena, Philadelphia, Pennsylvania, U.S.	
165	Win	98–14–3 (50)	Bud Mangino	KO	8 (10)	Oct 27, 1930	Arena, Trenton, New Jersey, U.S.	
164	Loss	97–14–3 (50)	Mike Dundee	NWS	10	Oct 6, 1930	Coliseum, Davenport, Iowa, U.S.	
163	Win	97–14–3 (49)	Cowboy Eddie Anderson	NWS	10	Sep 15, 1930	Coliseum, Des Moines, Iowa, U.S.	
162	Loss	97–14–3 (48)	Tommy Cello	DQ	2 (10)	Sep 10, 1930	Peoria, Illinois, U.S.	
161	Win	97–13–3 (48)	Cowboy Eddie Anderson	NWS	10	Sep 3, 1930	Coliseum, Des Moines, Iowa, U.S.	
160	Loss	97–13–3 (47)	Tony Canzoneri	UD	10	Jul 21, 1930	Shibe Park, Philadelphia, Pennsylvania, U.S.	
159	Win	97–12–3 (47)	Joey Goodman	SD	10	Jun 23, 1930	Meyers Bowl, North Braddock, Pennsylvania, U.S.	
158	Win	96–12–3 (47)	Cowboy Eddie Anderson	KO	3 (10)	Jun 10, 1930	Borchert Field, Milwaukee, Wisconsin, U.S.	
157	Loss	95–12–3 (47)	Eddie Shea	NWS	10	Mar 28, 1930	Arena, Saint Louis, Missouri, U.S.	NBA and The Ring junior-lightweight titles at stake; (via KO only)
156	Draw	95–12–3 (46)	Cowboy Eddie Anderson	PTS	10	Feb 22, 1930	Auditorium, Milwaukee, Wisconsin, U.S.	
155	Loss	95–12–2 (46)	Sammy Fuller	DQ	5 (10)	Feb 7, 1930	Boston Garden, Boston, Massachusetts, U.S.	
154	Win	95–11–2 (46)	Davey Abad	TKO	4 (10)	Feb 3, 1930	Coliseum, Saint Louis, Missouri, U.S.	Retained NBA and The Ring junior-lightweight titles
153	Win	94–11–2 (46)	Tod Morgan	KO	2 (15)	Dec 20, 1929	Madison Square Garden, New York City, New York, U.S.	Won NBA, NYSAC, and The Ring junior-lightweight titles
152	Win	93–11–2 (46)	Jim El Zaird	KO	4 (10)	Dec 2, 1929	Arena, Philadelphia, Pennsylvania, U.S.	
151	Win	92–11–2 (46)	Eddie Reed	PTS	10	Nov 11, 1929	Arena, Philadelphia, Pennsylvania, U.S.	
150	Win	91–11–2 (46)	Jimmy Mendo	KO	1 (10)	Nov 5, 1929	Arena, Saint Louis, Missouri, U.S.	
149	Win	90–11–2 (46)	Armando Santiago	KO	2 (10)	Oct 11, 1929	Baker Bowl, Philadelphia, Pennsylvania, U.S.	
148	Loss	89–11–2 (46)	Johnny Datto	DQ	2 (10)	Sep 27, 1929	Chicago Stadium, Chicago, Illinois, U.S.	
147	Win	89–10–2 (46)	Armando Santiago	DQ	2 (10)	Sep 18, 1929	Baker Bowl, Philadelphia, Pennsylvania, U.S.	Santiago was disqualified for two low blows
146	Win	88–10–2 (46)	Charley Goodman	TKO	2 (10)	Aug 23, 1929	Municipal Stadium, Long Branch, New Jersey, U.S.	
145	Win	87–10–2 (46)	Benny Carter	PTS	10	Jul 31, 1929	Ebbets Field, Brooklyn, New York City, New York, U.S.	
144	Win	86–10–2 (46)	Calvin Reed	PTS	8	Jul 26, 1929	Bacharach Ball Park, Atlantic City, New Jersey, U.S.	
143	Win	85–10–2 (46)	Augie Pisano	PTS	10	Jul 18, 1929	Dreamland Park, Newark, New Jersey, U.S.	
142	Win	84–10–2 (46)	Steve Smith	PTS	10	May 23, 1929	Meyers Bowl, North Braddock, Pennsylvania, U.S.	
141	Win	83–10–2 (46)	Petey Mack	PTS	10	May 6, 1929	St. Nicholas Arena, New York City, New York, U.S.	
140	Win	82–10–2 (46)	Johnny Farr	PTS	10	Apr 29, 1929	Arena, Philadelphia, Pennsylvania, U.S.	
139	Win	81–10–2 (46)	Harry Forbes	PTS	10	Mar 25, 1929	Arena, Philadelphia, Pennsylvania, U.S.	
138	Loss	80–10–2 (46)	Davey Abad	NWS	10	Mar 19, 1929	Coliseum, Saint Louis, Missouri, U.S.	
137	Win	80–10–2 (45)	Davey Abad	NWS	10	Feb 28, 1929	Coliseum, Saint Louis, Missouri, U.S.	
136	Win	80–10–2 (44)	Steve Smith	PTS	10	Feb 18, 1929	Arena, Philadelphia, Pennsylvania, U.S.	
135	Win	79–10–2 (44)	Harry Forbes	PTS	10	Feb 11, 1929	White City Arena, Chicago, Illinois, U.S.	
134	Loss	78–10–2 (44)	Henry Lenard	DQ	3 (10)	Feb 6, 1929	Coliseum, Saint Louis, Missouri, U.S.	
133	Win	78–9–2 (44)	Red Chapman	KO	1 (10)	Jan 28, 1929	Arena, Philadelphia, Pennsylvania, U.S.	
132	Win	77–9–2 (44)	Joe Rivers	KO	2 (10)	Jan 18, 1929	Coliseum, Saint Louis, Missouri, U.S.	
131	Win	76–9–2 (44)	Davey Abad	PTS	10	Jan 14, 1929	Arena, Philadelphia, Pennsylvania, U.S.	
130	Win	75–9–2 (44)	Gaston Charles	PTS	10	Dec 10, 1928	Arena, Philadelphia, Pennsylvania, U.S.	
129	Win	74–9–2 (44)	Dominick Petrone	TKO	1 (10)	Nov 15, 1928	South Main Street Armory, Wilkes-Barre, Pennsylvania, U.S.	
128	Loss	73–9–2 (44)	Phil McGraw	DQ	4 (10)	Oct 29, 1928	Arena, Philadelphia, Pennsylvania, U.S.	
127	Win	73–8–2 (44)	Harry Blitman	KO	6 (10)	Sep 10, 1928	Shibe Park, Philadelphia, Pennsylvania, U.S.	Retained USA Pennsylvania State featherweight title
126	Win	72–8–2 (44)	Tony Russo	TKO	2 (8)	Aug 27, 1928	Waltz Dream Arena, Atlantic City, New Jersey, U.S.	
125	Win	71–8–2 (44)	Jimmy Burns	KO	1 (8)	Aug 13, 1928	Waltz Dream Arena, Atlantic City, New Jersey, U.S.	
124	Loss	70–8–2 (44)	Pete Nebo	PTS	10	Jun 18, 1928	Shibe Park, Philadelphia, Pennsylvania, U.S.	
123	Win	70–7–2 (44)	Tommy Liberto	NWS	8	Jun 11, 1928	Waltz Dream Arena, Atlantic City, New Jersey, U.S.	
122	Loss	70–7–2 (43)	Tony Canzoneri	SD	15	Feb 10, 1928	Madison Square Garden, New York City, New York, U.S.	Lost NBA featherweight title; For NYSAC and The Ring featherweight titles
121	Win	70–6–2 (43)	Wilbur Cohen	NWS	8	Jan 30, 1928	Waltz Dream Arena, Atlantic City, New Jersey, U.S.	
120	Win	70–6–2 (42)	Pete Nebo	SD	10	Jan 2, 1928	Arena, Philadelphia, Pennsylvania, U.S.	
119	Win	69–6–2 (42)	Johnny Sheppard	PTS	10	Dec 12, 1927	Rhode Island Auditorium, Providence, Rhode Island, U.S.	
118	Win	68–6–2 (42)	Johnny Farr	PTS	10	Dec 9, 1927	Olympia Stadium, Detroit, Michigan, U.S.	
117	Win	67–6–2 (42)	Mike Ballerino	PTS	10	Oct 17, 1927	Arena, Philadelphia, Pennsylvania, U.S.	
116	Win	66–6–2 (42)	Red Chapman	UD	10	Sep 12, 1927	Sesquicentennial Stadium, Philadelphia, Pennsylvania, U.S.	Won inaugural NBA featherweight title
115	Win	65–6–2 (42)	Joey Williams	KO	8 (10)	Aug 16, 1927	Carnival Park, West Manayunk, Pennsylvania, U.S.	
114	Win	64–6–2 (42)	Johnny Farr	UD	10	Aug 10, 1927	Olympic Arena, Brooklyn, New York City, New York, U.S.	
113	Win	63–6–2 (42)	Tommy Crowley	KO	2 (10)	Aug 3, 1927	Harrogate Park, Philadelphia, Pennsylvania, U.S.	
112	Win	62–6–2 (42)	Mickey Doyle	KO	5 (10)	Jul 14, 1927	Artillery Park, Wilkes-Barre, Pennsylvania, U.S.	Won vacant USA Pennsylvania State featherweight title
111	Win	61–6–2 (42)	Joe Glick	PTS	10	Jun 27, 1927	Shibe Park, Philadelphia, Pennsylvania, U.S.	
110	Win	60–6–2 (42)	Dominick Petrone	PTS	10	Jun 16, 1927	Queensboro Stadium, Long Island City, Queens, New York City, New York, U.S.	
109	Win	59–6–2 (42)	Chick Suggs	PTS	10	May 2, 1927	Arena, Philadelphia, Pennsylvania, U.S.	
108	NC	58–6–2 (42)	Joe Glick	NC	3 (10)	Apr 11, 1927	Arena, Philadelphia, Pennsylvania, U.S.	Bass had been struck with a low blow, which felled him for the count
107	Win	58–6–2 (41)	Joe Glick	UD	10	Mar 21, 1927	Arena, Philadelphia, Pennsylvania, U.S.	
106	Win	57–6–2 (41)	Red Chapman	DQ	1 (10)	Jan 1, 1927	Madison Square Garden, New York City, New York, U.S.	
105	Win	56–6–2 (41)	Johnny Sheppard	PTS	10	Dec 10, 1926	Mechanics Building, Boston, Massachusetts, U.S.	
104	Win	55–6–2 (41)	Benny Cross	NWS	10	Dec 8, 1926	113th Regiment Armory, Newark, New Jersey, U.S.	
103	Loss	55–6–2 (40)	Babe Herman	PTS	12	Nov 23, 1926	Public Hall, Cleveland, Ohio, U.S.	
102	Win	55–5–2 (40)	Frankie Garcia	PTS	10	Oct 18, 1926	Broadway Arena, Brooklyn, New York City, New York, U.S.	
101	Win	54–5–2 (40)	Johnny Mosely	KO	9 (10)	Sep 20, 1926	Carnival Park, West Manayunk, Pennsylvania, U.S.	
100	Win	53–5–2 (40)	Jack Ruskin	KO	2 (6)	Sep 15, 1926	Airport, Atlantic City, New Jersey, U.S.	
99	Win	52–5–2 (40)	Babe Herman	PTS	10	Sep 1, 1926	Shibe Park, Philadelphia, Pennsylvania, U.S.	
98	Win	51–5–2 (40)	Johnny Farr	PTS	10	Jul 29, 1926	Madison Square Garden, New York City, New York, U.S.	
97	Draw	50–5–2 (40)	Dick Finnegan	PTS	10	Jul 12, 1926	Shibe Park, Philadelphia, Pennsylvania, U.S.	
96	Win	50–5–1 (40)	Georges Amblard	NWS	8	Jul 2, 1926	Bacharach Ball Park, Atlantic City, New Jersey, U.S.	
95	Win	50–5–1 (39)	Billy Kennedy	KO	7 (10)	Jun 24, 1926	Madison Square Garden, New York City, New York, U.S.	
94	Loss	49–5–1 (39)	Andy Martin	PTS	10	Jun 8, 1926	Providence, Rhode Island, U.S.	
93	Win	49–4–1 (39)	Ralph Repman	KO	3 (8)	Apr 19, 1926	Fulton Opera House, Lancaster, Pennsylvania, U.S.	
92	Win	48–4–1 (39)	Wilbur Cohen	TKO	7 (10)	Mar 10, 1926	108th Field Artillery Armory, Philadelphia, Pennsylvania, U.S.	
91	Loss	47–4–1 (39)	Pete Sarmiento	DQ	6 (12)	Mar 1, 1926	Public Hall, Cleveland, Ohio, U.S.	
90	Draw	47–3–1 (39)	Cowboy Eddie Anderson	MD	10	Feb 17, 1926	108th Field Artillery Armory, Philadelphia, Pennsylvania, U.S.	
89	Win	47–3 (39)	Al Corbett	KO	1 (12)	Jan 18, 1926	Public Hall, Cleveland, Ohio, U.S.	
88	Win	46–3 (39)	Leo Roy	PTS	10	Jan 11, 1926	Arena, Philadelphia, Pennsylvania, U.S.	
87	Win	45–3 (39)	Joe Nelson	TKO	4 (8)	Jan 1, 1926	Convention Hall, Camden, New Jersey, U.S.	
86	Win	44–3 (39)	Harry Scott	TKO	2 (8)	Dec 7, 1925	Waltz Dream Arena, Atlantic City, New Jersey, U.S.	
85	Win	43–3 (39)	Joe Ryder	PTS	10	Nov 26, 1925	Adelphia A.C., Philadelphia, Pennsylvania, U.S.	
84	Win	42–3 (39)	Jose Lombardo	PTS	10	Nov 16, 1925	Arena, Philadelphia, Pennsylvania, U.S.	
83	Win	41–3 (39)	Lew Mayrs	KO	2 (10)	Nov 2, 1925	Arena, Philadelphia, Pennsylvania, U.S.	
82	Win	40–3 (39)	Cowboy Eddie Anderson	UD	10	Oct 12, 1925	Arena, Philadelphia, Pennsylvania, U.S.	
81	Win	39–3 (39)	Cowboy Eddie Anderson	PTS	10	Sep 24, 1925	Shibe Park, Philadelphia, Pennsylvania, U.S.	
80	Win	38–3 (39)	Battling Mack	TKO	3 (8)	Aug 14, 1925	Public Service Ball Park, Camden, New Jersey, U.S.	
79	Win	37–3 (39)	Johnny Farr	NWS	10	Aug 11, 1925	Taylor Bowl, Newburgh Heights, Ohio, U.S.	
78	Win	37–3 (38)	Steve Smith	NWS	10	Jun 30, 1925	Taylor Bowl, Newburgh Heights, Ohio, U.S.	
77	Win	37–3 (37)	Johnny Sheppard	PTS	10	Jun 8, 1925	Shibe Park, Philadelphia, Pennsylvania, U.S.	
76	Win	36–3 (37)	Johnny Sheppard	UD	10	Apr 20, 1925	Arena, Philadelphia, Pennsylvania, U.S.	
75	Win	35–3 (37)	Joey Schwartz	PTS	10	Mar 9, 1925	Arena, Philadelphia, Pennsylvania, U.S.	
74	Win	34–3 (37)	Joey Schwartz	TKO	6 (10)	Feb 2, 1925	Arena, Philadelphia, Pennsylvania, U.S.	
73	Win	33–3 (37)	Willie Kid Harvey	KO	2 (10)	Jan 14, 1925	108th Field Artillery Armory, Philadelphia, Pennsylvania, U.S.	
72	Win	32–3 (37)	Earl Baird	KO	3 (10)	Dec 25, 1924	108th Field Artillery Armory, Philadelphia, Pennsylvania, U.S.	
71	Win	31–3 (37)	Tommy Noble	PTS	10	Dec 8, 1924	108th Field Artillery Armory, Philadelphia, Pennsylvania, U.S.	
70	Loss	30–3 (37)	Andy Martin	PTS	10	Nov 25, 1924	Infantry Hall, Providence, Rhode Island, U.S.	
69	Win	30–2 (37)	Tommy Noble	PTS	10	Nov 24, 1924	108th Field Artillery Armory, Philadelphia, Pennsylvania, U.S.	
68	Loss	29–2 (37)	Pete Sarmiento	NWS	10	Oct 20, 1924	Auditorium, Milwaukee, Wisconsin, U.S.	
67	Win	29–2 (36)	Terry Martin	PTS	10	Oct 3, 1924	Infantry Hall, Providence, Rhode Island, U.S.	
66	Win	28–2 (36)	Frankie Mandot	KO	1 (10)	Oct 1, 1924	Shibe Park, Philadelphia, Pennsylvania, U.S.	
65	Win	27–2 (36)	Al Markie	KO	3 (10)	Sep 8, 1924	Shibe Park, Philadelphia, Pennsylvania, U.S.	
64	Loss	26–2 (36)	Chick Suggs	NWS	10	Sep 5, 1924	Newport, Rhode Island, U.S.	
63	Win	26–2 (35)	Spencer Gardner	KO	6 (10)	Aug 20, 1924	Freebody Park, Newport, Rhode Island, U.S.	
62	Win	25–2 (35)	Spencer Gardner	UD	10	Jul 21, 1924	Shibe Park, Philadelphia, Pennsylvania, U.S.	
61	Win	24–2 (35)	Teddy Joyce	DQ	2 (8)	Jun 13, 1924	Sager's Arena, Aurora, Illinois, U.S.	
60	Win	23–2 (35)	Johnny Brown	KO	3 (10)	Apr 29, 1924	Arena, Philadelphia, Pennsylvania, U.S.	
59	Win	22–2 (35)	Sammy Craden	KO	3 (10)	Apr 25, 1924	Auditorium, Milwaukee, Wisconsin, U.S.	
58	Win	21–2 (35)	Young Wolgast	KO	1 (8)	Apr 15, 1924	Mechanics Building, Boston, Massachusetts, U.S.	
57	Win	20–2 (35)	Mickey Diamond	KO	1 (8)	Apr 7, 1924	Arena, Philadelphia, Pennsylvania, U.S.	
56	Win	19–2 (35)	Joey Clein	TKO	2 (10)	Apr 4, 1924	Auditorium, Milwaukee, Wisconsin, U.S.	
55	Win	18–2 (35)	Buck Fleming	PTS	10	Mar 14, 1924	Cambria A.C., Philadelphia, Pennsylvania, U.S.	
54	Win	17–2 (35)	Joe Nelson	UD	8	Feb 25, 1924	Arena, Philadelphia, Pennsylvania, U.S.	
53	Win	16–2 (35)	Jack Lester	KO	3 (10)	Feb 11, 1924	Arena, Philadelphia, Pennsylvania, U.S.	
52	Win	15–2 (35)	KO Leonard	KO	2 (10)	Jan 28, 1924	Arena, Philadelphia, Pennsylvania, U.S.	
51	Win	14–2 (35)	Joe Nelson	KO	2 (10)	Jan 18, 1924	Cambria A.C., Philadelphia, Pennsylvania, U.S.	
50	Win	13–2 (35)	Joe Nelson	PTS	10	Dec 14, 1923	Cambria A.C., Philadelphia, Pennsylvania, U.S.	
49	Loss	12–2 (35)	Tommy Murray	NWS	8	Nov 29, 1923	Arena, Philadelphia, Pennsylvania, U.S.	
48	Loss	12–2 (34)	Pete Sarmiento	NWS	8	Oct 22, 1923	Arena, Philadelphia, Pennsylvania, U.S.	
47	Win	12–2 (33)	Johnny Dixon	NWS	10	Aug 30, 1923	Airport, Atlantic City, New Jersey, U.S.	
46	Win	12–2 (32)	Eddie O'Keefe	TKO	3 (8)	Aug 16, 1923	Airport, Atlantic City, New Jersey, U.S.	
45	Win	11–2 (32)	Chick Kansas	NWS	8	Jul 30, 1923	Bacharach Ball Park, Atlantic City, New Jersey, U.S.	
44	Win	11–2 (31)	Mike Moran	NWS	8	Jun 18, 1923	Waltz Dream Arena, Atlantic City, New Jersey, U.S.	
43	Win	11–2 (30)	Al Gordon	NWS	8	Apr 16, 1923	Arena, Philadelphia, Pennsylvania, U.S.	
42	Loss	11–2 (29)	Bobby Garcia	PTS	6	Mar 1, 1923	Madison Square Garden, New York City, New York, U.S.	
41	NC	11–1 (29)	Kid Kansas	NC	3 (8)	Feb 27, 1923	Armory, Reading, Pennsylvania, U.S.	Declared NC because of stalling
40	Win	11–1 (28)	Battling Mack	NWS	8	Feb 8, 1923	Adelphia A.C., Philadelphia, Pennsylvania, U.S.	
39	Win	11–1 (27)	Tommy Murray	NWS	8	Dec 25, 1922	Arena, Philadelphia, Pennsylvania, U.S.	
38	Loss	11–1 (26)	Cuddy DeMarco	NWS	8	Dec 12, 1922	20th Century A.C., Philadelphia, Pennsylvania, U.S.	
37	Win	11–1 (25)	Billy Mascott	NWS	8	Nov 30, 1922	Arena, Philadelphia, Pennsylvania, U.S.	
36	Win	11–1 (24)	Jack Perry	NWS	8	Nov 9, 1922	Chestnut Street Arena, Philadelphia, Pennsylvania, U.S.	
35	Loss	11–1 (23)	Rosey Stoy	NWS	8	Oct 30, 1922	Western Market House, Lancaster, Pennsylvania, U.S.	
34	Win	11–1 (22)	Young Sharkey	KO	1 (8)	Oct 13, 1922	Cambria A.C., Philadelphia, Pennsylvania, U.S.	
33	Win	10–1 (22)	Joe McGovern	NWS	8	Aug 23, 1922	Logan A.C., Philadelphia, Pennsylvania, U.S.	
32	Win	10–1 (21)	Joe Nelson	NWS	8	Aug 21, 1922	Waltz Dream Arena, Atlantic City, New Jersey, U.S.	
31	Win	10–1 (20)	Frankie Ferro	NWS	8	Aug 18, 1922	Cambria A.C., Philadelphia, Pennsylvania, U.S.	
30	Win	10–1 (19)	Marty Burns	NWS	8	Jul 31, 1922	Waltz Dream Arena, Atlantic City, New Jersey, U.S.	
29	Loss	10–1 (18)	Jimmy Mendo	NWS	8	Jul 18, 1922	Ice Palace, Philadelphia, Pennsylvania, U.S.	
28	Loss	10–1 (17)	Chick Kansas	DQ	3 (6)	Jul 7, 1922	Ice Palace, Philadelphia, Pennsylvania, U.S.	
27	Win	10–0 (17)	Young Coster	KO	3 (6)	Jun 13, 1922	Ice Palace, Philadelphia, Pennsylvania, U.S.	
26	Win	9–0 (17)	Joe Bradley	KO	2 (8)	May 5, 1922	Cambria A.C., Philadelphia, Pennsylvania, U.S.	
25	Win	8–0 (17)	Chick Kansas	NWS	6	Apr 20, 1922	Ice Palace, Philadelphia, Pennsylvania, U.S.	
24	Win	8–0 (16)	Jack Lester	NWS	8	Apr 3, 1922	Waltz Dream Arena, Atlantic City, New Jersey, U.S.	
23	Win	8–0 (15)	Bobby McLeod	NWS	6	Mar 17, 1922	Cambria A.C., Philadelphia, Pennsylvania, U.S.	
22	Draw	8–0 (14)	Mickey Wolgast	NWS	6	Mar 3, 1922	Cambria A.C., Philadelphia, Pennsylvania, U.S.	
21	Win	8–0 (13)	Sailor Joe Kelly	NWS	6	Feb 20, 1922	Cambria A.C., Philadelphia, Pennsylvania, U.S.	
20	Loss	8–0 (12)	Tommy Murray	NWS	6	Jan 16, 1922	Olympia A.C., Philadelphia, Pennsylvania, U.S.	
19	Win	8–0 (11)	Terry Hanlon	NWS	8	Jan 13, 1922	Cambria A.C., Philadelphia, Pennsylvania, U.S.	
18	Win	8–0 (10)	Joe Bradley	KO	4 (8)	Jan 12, 1922	Auditorium A.A., Philadelphia, Pennsylvania, U.S.	
17	Loss	7–0 (10)	Billy Devine	NWS	6	Dec 12, 1921	Olympia A.C., Philadelphia, Pennsylvania, U.S.	
16	Win	7–0 (9)	Tommy Gorman	KO	2 (8)	Dec 2, 1921	Cambria A.C., Philadelphia, Pennsylvania, U.S.	
15	Win	6–0 (9)	Sailor Joe Kelly	NWS	4	Nov 23, 1921	Bijou Theater, Philadelphia, Pennsylvania, U.S.	
14	Win	6–0 (8)	Whitey Langdon	KO	6 (8)	Nov 18, 1921	Cambria A.C., Philadelphia, Pennsylvania, U.S.	
13	Win	5–0 (8)	Leo Vincent	NWS	6	Oct 20, 1921	Ice Palace, Philadelphia, Pennsylvania, U.S.	
12	Win	5–0 (7)	Bobby Allen	TKO	3 (6)	Oct 10, 1921	Olympia A.C., Philadelphia, Pennsylvania, U.S.	
11	Win	4–0 (7)	Leo Reynolds	TKO	3 (6)	Sep 24, 1921	National A.C., Philadelphia, Pennsylvania, U.S.	
10	Draw	3–0 (7)	Sailor Joe Kelly	NWS	8	May 3, 1921	Auditorium A.A., Philadelphia, Pennsylvania, U.S.	
9	Draw	3–0 (6)	Johnny Royce	NWS	8	Apr 26, 1921	Auditorium A.A., Philadelphia, Pennsylvania, U.S.	
8	Win	3–0 (5)	Harry Roth	KO	2 (6)	Apr 9, 1921	National A.C., Philadelphia, Pennsylvania, U.S.	
7	Win	2–0 (5)	Willie Tasker	KO	2 (6)	Apr 5, 1921	Auditorium A.A., Philadelphia, Pennsylvania, U.S.	
6	Win	1–0 (5)	Young Joe Tuber	NWS	6	Apr 2, 1921	Auditorium A.A., Philadelphia, Pennsylvania, U.S.	
5	Win	1–0 (4)	Sailor Joe Kelly	NWS	6	Mar 22, 1921	Auditorium A.A., Philadelphia, Pennsylvania, U.S.	
4	Win	1–0 (3)	Young Joe Tuber	NWS	6	Mar 8, 1921	Auditorium A.A., Philadelphia, Pennsylvania, U.S.	
3	Draw	1–0 (2)	Jimmy Monroe	NWS	8	Mar 2, 1921	National A.C., Philadelphia, Pennsylvania, U.S.	
2	Win	1–0 (1)	Matty Dechter	NWS	6	Jan 29, 1921	National A.C., Philadelphia, Pennsylvania, U.S.	
1	Win	1–0	Jack Martin	KO	1 (6)	Dec 2, 1919	Gayety Theater, Philadelphia, Pennsylvania, U.S.	

=== Unofficial record ===
243 fights	190 wins	41 losses
By knockout	72	2
By decision	115	32
By disqualification	3	7
Draws	10	
No contests	2	

Record with the inclusion of newspaper decisions in the win/loss/draw column.

No.	Result	Record	Opponent	Type	Round	Date	Location	Notes
243	Loss	190–41–10 (2)	Tommy Speigal	UD	10	May 7, 1940	Convention Hall, Philadelphia, Pennsylvania, U.S.	For USA Pennsylvania State lightweight title
242	Loss	190–40–10 (2)	Jimmy Tygh	MD	10	Apr 8, 1940	Convention Hall, Philadelphia, Pennsylvania, U.S.	
241	Draw	190–39–10 (2)	Jimmy Tygh	PTS	10	Mar 4, 1940	Convention Hall, Philadelphia, Pennsylvania, U.S.	
240	Win	190–39–9 (2)	Norman Rahn	KO	1 (10)	Feb 2, 1940	Cambria A.C., Philadelphia, Pennsylvania, U.S.	
239	Win	189–39–9 (2)	Tony Sarullo	PTS	8	Jan 22, 1940	Convention Hall, Philadelphia, Pennsylvania, U.S.	
238	Win	188–39–9 (2)	Norman Rahn	UD	10	Oct 13, 1939	Cambria A.C., Philadelphia, Pennsylvania, U.S.	
237	Win	187–39–9 (2)	Young Chappie	KO	2 (10)	Aug 10, 1939	Cambria Stadium, Philadelphia, Pennsylvania, U.S.	
236	Loss	186–39–9 (2)	Henry Armstrong	KO	4 (10)	Jul 27, 1937	Baker Bowl, Philadelphia, Pennsylvania, U.S.	
235	Win	186–38–9 (2)	Tommy Cross	SD	10	Jun 15, 1937	Baker Bowl, Philadelphia, Pennsylvania, U.S.	
234	Win	185–38–9 (2)	Gene Gallotto	UD	10	Apr 16, 1937	Cambria A.C., Philadelphia, Pennsylvania, U.S.	
233	Win	184–38–9 (2)	Johnny Cabello	KO	2 (10)	Apr 8, 1937	Olympia A.C., Philadelphia, Pennsylvania, U.S.	
232	Win	183–38–9 (2)	Charley Gomer	PTS	10	Mar 18, 1937	Olympia A.C., Philadelphia, Pennsylvania, U.S.	
231	Win	182–38–9 (2)	Andy Bundy	PTS	10	Mar 12, 1937	Cambria A.C., Philadelphia, Pennsylvania, U.S.	
230	Win	181–38–9 (2)	Gene Gallotto	PTS	10	Feb 5, 1937	Cambria A.C., Philadelphia, Pennsylvania, U.S.	
229	Win	180–38–9 (2)	Freddie 'Red' Cochrane	PTS	10	Jan 22, 1937	Cambria A.C., Philadelphia, Pennsylvania, U.S.	
228	Win	179–38–9 (2)	Joey Allen	PTS	10	Jan 14, 1937	Olympia A.C., Philadelphia, Pennsylvania, U.S.	
227	Win	178–38–9 (2)	Joey Zodda	KO	1 (10)	Dec 18, 1936	Cambria A.C., Philadelphia, Pennsylvania, U.S.	
226	Win	177–38–9 (2)	Dave Finn	PTS	10	Dec 4, 1936	Cambria A.C., Philadelphia, Pennsylvania, U.S.	
225	Win	176–38–9 (2)	Johnny Craven	TKO	2 (10)	Dec 25, 1935	Arena, Philadelphia, Pennsylvania, U.S.	
224	Win	175–38–9 (2)	Charley Burns	PTS	10	Dec 6, 1935	Cambria A.C., Philadelphia, Pennsylvania, U.S.	
223	Loss	174–38–9 (2)	Jack Portney	PTS	10	Nov 11, 1935	Carlin's Park, Baltimore, Maryland, U.S.	
222	Win	174–37–9 (2)	George Gibbs	PTS	10	Oct 11, 1935	Cambria A.C., Philadelphia, Pennsylvania, U.S.	
221	Win	173–37–9 (2)	Mike Marshall	PTS	10	Aug 27, 1935	Open Air Arena, Leiperville, Pennsylvania, U.S.	
220	Win	172–37–9 (2)	Johnny Craven	PTS	10	Aug 21, 1935	Carnival Park, West Manayunk, Pennsylvania, U.S.	
219	Loss	171–37–9 (2)	Jimmy Leto	PTS	10	Jul 29, 1935	South Park Arena, Hartford, Connecticut, U.S.	
218	Win	171–36–9 (2)	Johnny Craven	PTS	10	Jul 26, 1935	Carnival Park, West Manayunk, Pennsylvania, U.S.	
217	Win	170–36–9 (2)	Frankie Wallace	SD	8	Jul 23, 1935	Maple Grove Field House, Lancaster, Pennsylvania, U.S.	
216	Win	169–36–9 (2)	Mose Butch	SD	10	May 27, 1935	Hickey Park, Millvale, Pennsylvania, U.S.	
215	Win	168–36–9 (2)	Tony Falco	MD	10	Apr 29, 1935	Arena, Philadelphia, Pennsylvania, U.S.	
214	Win	167–36–9 (2)	Mike Marshall	PTS	10	Apr 14, 1935	Cambria A.C., Philadelphia, Pennsylvania, U.S.	
213	Win	166–36–9 (2)	Mike Marshall	PTS	10	Mar 22, 1935	Cambria A.C., Philadelphia, Pennsylvania, U.S.	
212	Loss	165–36–9 (2)	Eddie Cool	MD	10	Feb 18, 1935	Arena, Philadelphia, Pennsylvania, U.S.	
211	Win	165–35–9 (2)	Jimmy Brady	PTS	10	Dec 25, 1934	Laurel Garden, Newark, New Jersey, U.S.	
210	Win	164–35–9 (2)	Baby Kid Chocolate	TKO	2 (8)	Dec 20, 1934	Convention Hall, Atlantic City, New Jersey, U.S.	
209	Win	163–35–9 (2)	Frankie Wallace	PTS	10	Dec 3, 1934	Convention Hall, Philadelphia, Pennsylvania, U.S.	
208	Loss	162–35–9 (2)	Petey Sarron	MD	10	Sep 24, 1934	Arena, Philadelphia, Pennsylvania, U.S.	
207	Win	162–34–9 (2)	Eddie Shea	KO	2 (10)	Aug 31, 1934	Bader Field, Atlantic City, New Jersey, U.S.	
206	Loss	161–34–9 (2)	Petey Sarron	DQ	6 (10)	Aug 27, 1934	Griffith Stadium, Washington, D.C., U.S.	
205	Win	161–33–9 (2)	Johnny Jadick	PTS	10	Jul 31, 1934	Baker Bowl, Philadelphia, Pennsylvania, U.S.	
204	Loss	160–33–9 (2)	Cleto Locatelli	SD	10	Apr 30, 1934	Convention Hall, Philadelphia, Pennsylvania, U.S.	
203	Win	160–32–9 (2)	Jimmy Leto	RTD	2 (10)	Apr 9, 1934	Arena, Philadelphia, Pennsylvania, U.S.	
202	Draw	159–32–9 (2)	Cleto Locatelli	PTS	10	Mar 12, 1934	Arena, Philadelphia, Pennsylvania, U.S.	
201	Win	159–32–8 (2)	Eddie Cool	SD	10	Dec 27, 1933	Convention Hall, Philadelphia, Pennsylvania, U.S.	Won vacant USA Pennsylvania State lightweight title
200	Win	158–32–8 (2)	Stumpy Jacobs	PTS	8	Oct 2, 1933	Waltz Dream Arena, Atlantic City, New Jersey, U.S.	
199	Loss	157–32–8 (2)	Davey Abad	DQ	7 (10)	Sep 4, 1933	Buffalo Stadium, Houston, Texas, U.S.	
198	Win	157–31–8 (2)	Stumpy Jacobs	PTS	8	Aug 30, 1933	Arena, Virginia Beach, Virginia, U.S.	
197	Win	156–31–8 (2)	Jack Portney	KO	2 (10)	Aug 21, 1933	Convention Hall, Atlantic City, New Jersey, U.S.	
196	Win	155–31–8 (2)	Buster Brown	PTS	10	Aug 7, 1933	Convention Hall, Atlantic City, New Jersey, U.S.	
195	Win	154–31–8 (2)	Buster Brown	PTS	10	May 22, 1933	Carlin's Park, Baltimore, Maryland, U.S.	
194	Win	153–31–8 (2)	Jackie Willis	PTS	8	Apr 17, 1933	Waltz Dream Arena, Atlantic City, New Jersey, U.S.	
193	Win	152–31–8 (2)	Johnny Farr	PTS	8	Apr 4, 1933	Olympia A.C., Philadelphia, Pennsylvania, U.S.	
192	Win	151–31–8 (2)	Joe Ghnouly	MD	10	Mar 8, 1933	Arena, Saint Louis, Missouri, U.S.	
191	Win	150–31–8 (2)	Phil Zwick	PTS	10	Feb 22, 1933	Olympia A.C., Philadelphia, Pennsylvania, U.S.	
190	Win	149–31–8 (2)	Sid Lampe	KO	2 (8)	Jan 27, 1933	Madison Square Garden, New York City, New York, U.S.	
189	Win	148–31–8 (2)	Dominick Petrone	TKO	3 (10)	Dec 12, 1932	St. Nicholas Arena, New York City, New York, U.S.	
188	Win	147–31–8 (2)	Eddie Reilly	KO	1 (10)	Dec 5, 1932	St. Nicholas Arena, New York City, New York, U.S.	
187	Win	146–31–8 (2)	Tony Falco	PTS	10	Sep 12, 1932	Convention Hall, Philadelphia, Pennsylvania, U.S.	
186	Win	145–31–8 (2)	Young Patsy Wallace	PTS	10	Aug 26, 1932	Atlantic City Auditorium, Atlantic City, New Jersey, U.S.	
185	Win	144–31–8 (2)	Ernie Ratner	PTS	10	Jul 25, 1932	Thompson's Stadium, Staten Island, New York City, New York, U.S.	
184	Draw	143–31–8 (2)	Harry Carlton	PTS	10	Jun 7, 1932	Oakland Outdoor Arena, Jersey City, New Jersey, U.S.	
183	Win	143–31–7 (2)	Harry Dublinsky	SD	10	May 25, 1932	Arena Stadium, Philadelphia, Pennsylvania, U.S.	
182	Win	142–31–7 (2)	Young Zazzarino	KO	5 (10)	Apr 15, 1932	Hollywood Arena, Jersey City, New Jersey, U.S.	
181	Win	141–31–7 (2)	Mickey Doyle	KO	2 (8)	Apr 14, 1932	Auditorium, Wilmington, Delaware, U.S.	
180	Loss	140–31–7 (2)	Frank Bojarski	DQ	3 (10)	Mar 14, 1932	Motor Square Garden, Pittsburgh, Pennsylvania, U.S.	
179	Loss	140–30–7 (2)	Wesley Ramey	UD	10	Mar 9, 1932	Coliseum, Saint Louis, Missouri, U.S.	
178	Win	140–29–7 (2)	Prince Saunders	KO	7 (10)	Dec 25, 1931	Arena, Philadelphia, Pennsylvania, U.S.	
177	Win	139–29–7 (2)	Sid Lampe	KO	3 (10)	Dec 18, 1931	Auditorium, Wilmington, Delaware, U.S.	
176	Loss	138–29–7 (2)	Jackie Pilkington	DQ	5 (10)	Nov 30, 1931	Arena, Philadelphia, Pennsylvania, U.S.	Bass was disqualified for punching low
175	Loss	138–28–7 (2)	Kid Chocolate	TKO	7 (10)	Jul 15, 1931	Shibe Park, Philadelphia, Pennsylvania, U.S.	Lost NBA and The Ring junior-lightweight titles
174	Win	138–27–7 (2)	Georgie Day	TKO	2 (10)	Jun 26, 1931	Convention Hall, Atlantic City, New Jersey, U.S.	
173	Win	137–27–7 (2)	Eddie Mack	KO	3 (10)	May 4, 1931	Arena, Philadelphia, Pennsylvania, U.S.	
172	Win	136–27–7 (2)	Young Joe Firpo	PTS	10	Apr 13, 1931	Arena, Philadelphia, Pennsylvania, U.S.	
171	Loss	135–27–7 (2)	Young Joe Firpo	PTS	10	Mar 30, 1931	Arena, Philadelphia, Pennsylvania, U.S.	
170	Win	135–26–7 (2)	Bud Taylor	TKO	2 (10)	Feb 16, 1931	Arena, Philadelphia, Pennsylvania, U.S.	
169	Win	134–26–7 (2)	Lew Massey	UD	10	Jan 5, 1931	Arena, Philadelphia, Pennsylvania, U.S.	Retained NBA and The Ring junior-lightweight titles
168	Win	133–26–7 (2)	Johnny Jadick	UD	10	Dec 8, 1930	Arena, Philadelphia, Pennsylvania, U.S.	
167	Win	132–26–7 (2)	Al Bryant	UD	10	Dec 2, 1930	Manhattan Auditorium, Allentown, Pennsylvania, U.S.	
166	Win	131–26–7 (2)	Bud Mangino	UD	10	Nov 24, 1930	Arena, Philadelphia, Pennsylvania, U.S.	
165	Win	130–26–7 (2)	Bud Mangino	KO	8 (10)	Oct 27, 1930	Arena, Trenton, New Jersey, U.S.	
164	Loss	129–26–7 (2)	Mike Dundee	NWS	10	Oct 6, 1930	Coliseum, Davenport, Iowa, U.S.	
163	Win	129–25–7 (2)	Cowboy Eddie Anderson	NWS	10	Sep 15, 1930	Coliseum, Des Moines, Iowa, U.S.	
162	Loss	128–25–7 (2)	Tommy Cello	DQ	2 (10)	Sep 10, 1930	Peoria, Illinois, U.S.	
161	Win	128–24–7 (2)	Cowboy Eddie Anderson	NWS	10	Sep 3, 1930	Coliseum, Des Moines, Iowa, U.S.	
160	Loss	127–24–7 (2)	Tony Canzoneri	UD	10	Jul 21, 1930	Shibe Park, Philadelphia, Pennsylvania, U.S.	
159	Win	127–23–7 (2)	Joey Goodman	SD	10	Jun 23, 1930	Meyers Bowl, North Braddock, Pennsylvania, U.S.	
158	Win	126–23–7 (2)	Cowboy Eddie Anderson	KO	3 (10)	Jun 10, 1930	Borchert Field, Milwaukee, Wisconsin, U.S.	
157	Loss	125–23–7 (2)	Eddie Shea	NWS	10	Mar 28, 1930	Arena, Saint Louis, Missouri, U.S.	NBA and The Ring junior-lightweight titles at stake; (via KO only)
156	Draw	125–22–7 (2)	Cowboy Eddie Anderson	PTS	10	Feb 22, 1930	Auditorium, Milwaukee, Wisconsin, U.S.	
155	Loss	125–22–6 (2)	Sammy Fuller	DQ	5 (10)	Feb 7, 1930	Boston Garden, Boston, Massachusetts, U.S.	
154	Win	125–21–6 (2)	Davey Abad	TKO	4 (10)	Feb 3, 1930	Coliseum, Saint Louis, Missouri, U.S.	Retained NBA and The Ring junior-lightweight titles
153	Win	124–21–6 (2)	Tod Morgan	KO	2 (15)	Dec 20, 1929	Madison Square Garden, New York City, New York, U.S.	Won NBA, NYSAC, and The Ring junior-lightweight titles
152	Win	123–21–6 (2)	Jim El Zaird	KO	4 (10)	Dec 2, 1929	Arena, Philadelphia, Pennsylvania, U.S.	
151	Win	122–21–6 (2)	Eddie Reed	PTS	10	Nov 11, 1929	Arena, Philadelphia, Pennsylvania, U.S.	
150	Win	121–21–6 (2)	Jimmy Mendo	KO	1 (10)	Nov 5, 1929	Arena, Saint Louis, Missouri, U.S.	
149	Win	120–21–6 (2)	Armando Santiago	KO	2 (10)	Oct 11, 1929	Baker Bowl, Philadelphia, Pennsylvania, U.S.	
148	Loss	119–21–6 (2)	Johnny Datto	DQ	2 (10)	Sep 27, 1929	Chicago Stadium, Chicago, Illinois, U.S.	
147	Win	119–20–6 (2)	Armando Santiago	DQ	2 (10)	Sep 18, 1929	Baker Bowl, Philadelphia, Pennsylvania, U.S.	Santiago was disqualified for two low blows
146	Win	118–20–6 (2)	Charley Goodman	TKO	2 (10)	Aug 23, 1929	Municipal Stadium, Long Branch, New Jersey, U.S.	
145	Win	117–20–6 (2)	Benny Carter	PTS	10	Jul 31, 1929	Ebbets Field, Brooklyn, New York City, New York, U.S.	
144	Win	116–20–6 (2)	Calvin Reed	PTS	8	Jul 26, 1929	Bacharach Ball Park, Atlantic City, New Jersey, U.S.	
143	Win	115–20–6 (2)	Augie Pisano	PTS	10	Jul 18, 1929	Dreamland Park, Newark, New Jersey, U.S.	
142	Win	114–20–6 (2)	Steve Smith	PTS	10	May 23, 1929	Meyers Bowl, North Braddock, Pennsylvania, U.S.	
141	Win	113–20–6 (2)	Petey Mack	PTS	10	May 6, 1929	St. Nicholas Arena, New York City, New York, U.S.	
140	Win	112–20–6 (2)	Johnny Farr	PTS	10	Apr 29, 1929	Arena, Philadelphia, Pennsylvania, U.S.	
139	Win	111–20–6 (2)	Harry Forbes	PTS	10	Mar 25, 1929	Arena, Philadelphia, Pennsylvania, U.S.	
138	Loss	110–20–6 (2)	Davey Abad	NWS	10	Mar 19, 1929	Coliseum, Saint Louis, Missouri, U.S.	
137	Win	110–19–6 (2)	Davey Abad	NWS	10	Feb 28, 1929	Coliseum, Saint Louis, Missouri, U.S.	
136	Win	109–19–6 (2)	Steve Smith	PTS	10	Feb 18, 1929	Arena, Philadelphia, Pennsylvania, U.S.	
135	Win	108–19–6 (2)	Harry Forbes	PTS	10	Feb 11, 1929	White City Arena, Chicago, Illinois, U.S.	
134	Loss	107–19–6 (2)	Henry Lenard	DQ	3 (10)	Feb 6, 1929	Coliseum, Saint Louis, Missouri, U.S.	
133	Win	107–18–6 (2)	Red Chapman	KO	1 (10)	Jan 28, 1929	Arena, Philadelphia, Pennsylvania, U.S.	
132	Win	106–18–6 (2)	Joe Rivers	KO	2 (10)	Jan 18, 1929	Coliseum, Saint Louis, Missouri, U.S.	
131	Win	105–18–6 (2)	Davey Abad	PTS	10	Jan 14, 1929	Arena, Philadelphia, Pennsylvania, U.S.	
130	Win	104–18–6 (2)	Gaston Charles	PTS	10	Dec 10, 1928	Arena, Philadelphia, Pennsylvania, U.S.	
129	Win	103–18–6 (2)	Dominick Petrone	TKO	1 (10)	Nov 15, 1928	South Main Street Armory, Wilkes-Barre, Pennsylvania, U.S.	
128	Loss	102–18–6 (2)	Phil McGraw	DQ	4 (10)	Oct 29, 1928	Arena, Philadelphia, Pennsylvania, U.S.	
127	Win	102–17–6 (2)	Harry Blitman	KO	6 (10)	Sep 10, 1928	Shibe Park, Philadelphia, Pennsylvania, U.S.	Retained USA Pennsylvania State featherweight title
126	Win	101–17–6 (2)	Tony Russo	TKO	2 (8)	Aug 27, 1928	Waltz Dream Arena, Atlantic City, New Jersey, U.S.	
125	Win	100–17–6 (2)	Jimmy Burns	KO	1 (8)	Aug 13, 1928	Waltz Dream Arena, Atlantic City, New Jersey, U.S.	
124	Loss	99–17–6 (2)	Pete Nebo	PTS	10	Jun 18, 1928	Shibe Park, Philadelphia, Pennsylvania, U.S.	
123	Win	99–16–6 (2)	Tommy Liberto	NWS	8	Jun 11, 1928	Waltz Dream Arena, Atlantic City, New Jersey, U.S.	
122	Loss	98–16–6 (2)	Tony Canzoneri	SD	15	Feb 10, 1928	Madison Square Garden, New York City, New York, U.S.	Lost NBA featherweight title; For NYSAC and The Ring featherweight titles
121	Win	98–15–6 (2)	Wilbur Cohen	NWS	8	Jan 30, 1928	Waltz Dream Arena, Atlantic City, New Jersey, U.S.	
120	Win	97–15–6 (2)	Pete Nebo	SD	10	Jan 2, 1928	Arena, Philadelphia, Pennsylvania, U.S.	
119	Win	96–15–6 (2)	Johnny Sheppard	PTS	10	Dec 12, 1927	Rhode Island Auditorium, Providence, Rhode Island, U.S.	
118	Win	95–15–6 (2)	Johnny Farr	PTS	10	Dec 9, 1927	Olympia Stadium, Detroit, Michigan, U.S.	
117	Win	94–15–6 (2)	Mike Ballerino	PTS	10	Oct 17, 1927	Arena, Philadelphia, Pennsylvania, U.S.	
116	Win	93–15–6 (2)	Red Chapman	UD	10	Sep 12, 1927	Sesquicentennial Stadium, Philadelphia, Pennsylvania, U.S.	Won inaugural NBA featherweight title
115	Win	92–15–6 (2)	Joey Williams	KO	8 (10)	Aug 16, 1927	Carnival Park, West Manayunk, Pennsylvania, U.S.	
114	Win	91–15–6 (2)	Johnny Farr	UD	10	Aug 10, 1927	Olympic Arena, Brooklyn, New York City, New York, U.S.	
113	Win	90–15–6 (2)	Tommy Crowley	KO	2 (10)	Aug 3, 1927	Harrogate Park, Philadelphia, Pennsylvania, U.S.	
112	Win	89–15–6 (2)	Mickey Doyle	KO	5 (10)	Jul 14, 1927	Artillery Park, Wilkes-Barre, Pennsylvania, U.S.	Won vacant USA Pennsylvania State featherweight title
111	Win	88–15–6 (2)	Joe Glick	PTS	10	Jun 27, 1927	Shibe Park, Philadelphia, Pennsylvania, U.S.	
110	Win	87–15–6 (2)	Dominick Petrone	PTS	10	Jun 16, 1927	Queensboro Stadium, Long Island City, Queens, New York City, New York, U.S.	
109	Win	86–15–6 (2)	Chick Suggs	PTS	10	May 2, 1927	Arena, Philadelphia, Pennsylvania, U.S.	
108	NC	85–15–6 (2)	Joe Glick	NC	3 (10)	Apr 11, 1927	Arena, Philadelphia, Pennsylvania, U.S.	Bass had been struck with a low blow, which felled him for the count
107	Win	85–15–6 (1)	Joe Glick	UD	10	Mar 21, 1927	Arena, Philadelphia, Pennsylvania, U.S.	
106	Win	84–15–6 (1)	Red Chapman	DQ	1 (10)	Jan 1, 1927	Madison Square Garden, New York City, New York, U.S.	
105	Win	83–15–6 (1)	Johnny Sheppard	PTS	10	Dec 10, 1926	Mechanics Building, Boston, Massachusetts, U.S.	
104	Win	82–15–6 (1)	Benny Cross	NWS	10	Dec 8, 1926	113th Regiment Armory, Newark, New Jersey, U.S.	
103	Loss	81–15–6 (1)	Babe Herman	PTS	12	Nov 23, 1926	Public Hall, Cleveland, Ohio, U.S.	
102	Win	81–14–6 (1)	Frankie Garcia	PTS	10	Oct 18, 1926	Broadway Arena, Brooklyn, New York City, New York, U.S.	
101	Win	80–14–6 (1)	Johnny Mosely	KO	9 (10)	Sep 20, 1926	Carnival Park, West Manayunk, Pennsylvania, U.S.	
100	Win	79–14–6 (1)	Jack Ruskin	KO	2 (6)	Sep 15, 1926	Airport, Atlantic City, New Jersey, U.S.	
99	Win	78–14–6 (1)	Babe Herman	PTS	10	Sep 1, 1926	Shibe Park, Philadelphia, Pennsylvania, U.S.	
98	Win	77–14–6 (1)	Johnny Farr	PTS	10	Jul 29, 1926	Madison Square Garden, New York City, New York, U.S.	
97	Draw	76–14–6 (1)	Dick Finnegan	PTS	10	Jul 12, 1926	Shibe Park, Philadelphia, Pennsylvania, U.S.	
96	Win	76–14–5 (1)	Georges Amblard	NWS	8	Jul 2, 1926	Bacharach Ball Park, Atlantic City, New Jersey, U.S.	
95	Win	75–14–5 (1)	Billy Kennedy	KO	7 (10)	Jun 24, 1926	Madison Square Garden, New York City, New York, U.S.	
94	Loss	74–14–5 (1)	Andy Martin	PTS	10	Jun 8, 1926	Providence, Rhode Island, U.S.	
93	Win	74–13–5 (1)	Ralph Repman	KO	3 (8)	Apr 19, 1926	Fulton Opera House, Lancaster, Pennsylvania, U.S.	
92	Win	73–13–5 (1)	Wilbur Cohen	TKO	7 (10)	Mar 10, 1926	108th Field Artillery Armory, Philadelphia, Pennsylvania, U.S.	
91	Loss	72–13–5 (1)	Pete Sarmiento	DQ	6 (12)	Mar 1, 1926	Public Hall, Cleveland, Ohio, U.S.	
90	Draw	72–12–5 (1)	Cowboy Eddie Anderson	MD	10	Feb 17, 1926	108th Field Artillery Armory, Philadelphia, Pennsylvania, U.S.	
89	Win	72–12–4 (1)	Al Corbett	KO	1 (12)	Jan 18, 1926	Public Hall, Cleveland, Ohio, U.S.	
88	Win	71–12–4 (1)	Leo Roy	PTS	10	Jan 11, 1926	Arena, Philadelphia, Pennsylvania, U.S.	
87	Win	70–12–4 (1)	Joe Nelson	TKO	4 (8)	Jan 1, 1926	Convention Hall, Camden, New Jersey, U.S.	
86	Win	69–12–4 (1)	Harry Scott	TKO	2 (8)	Dec 7, 1925	Waltz Dream Arena, Atlantic City, New Jersey, U.S.	
85	Win	68–12–4 (1)	Joe Ryder	PTS	10	Nov 26, 1925	Adelphia A.C., Philadelphia, Pennsylvania, U.S.	
84	Win	67–12–4 (1)	Jose Lombardo	PTS	10	Nov 16, 1925	Arena, Philadelphia, Pennsylvania, U.S.	
83	Win	66–12–4 (1)	Lew Mayrs	KO	2 (10)	Nov 2, 1925	Arena, Philadelphia, Pennsylvania, U.S.	
82	Win	65–12–4 (1)	Cowboy Eddie Anderson	UD	10	Oct 12, 1925	Arena, Philadelphia, Pennsylvania, U.S.	
81	Win	64–12–4 (1)	Cowboy Eddie Anderson	PTS	10	Sep 24, 1925	Shibe Park, Philadelphia, Pennsylvania, U.S.	
80	Win	63–12–4 (1)	Battling Mack	TKO	3 (8)	Aug 14, 1925	Public Service Ball Park, Camden, New Jersey, U.S.	
79	Win	62–12–4 (1)	Johnny Farr	NWS	10	Aug 11, 1925	Taylor Bowl, Newburgh Heights, Ohio, U.S.	
78	Win	61–12–4 (1)	Steve Smith	NWS	10	Jun 30, 1925	Taylor Bowl, Newburgh Heights, Ohio, U.S.	
77	Win	60–12–4 (1)	Johnny Sheppard	PTS	10	Jun 8, 1925	Shibe Park, Philadelphia, Pennsylvania, U.S.	
76	Win	59–12–4 (1)	Johnny Sheppard	UD	10	Apr 20, 1925	Arena, Philadelphia, Pennsylvania, U.S.	
75	Win	58–12–4 (1)	Joey Schwartz	PTS	10	Mar 9, 1925	Arena, Philadelphia, Pennsylvania, U.S.	
74	Win	57–12–4 (1)	Joey Schwartz	TKO	6 (10)	Feb 2, 1925	Arena, Philadelphia, Pennsylvania, U.S.	
73	Win	56–12–4 (1)	Willie Kid Harvey	KO	2 (10)	Jan 14, 1925	108th Field Artillery Armory, Philadelphia, Pennsylvania, U.S.	
72	Win	55–12–4 (1)	Earl Baird	KO	3 (10)	Dec 25, 1924	108th Field Artillery Armory, Philadelphia, Pennsylvania, U.S.	
71	Win	54–12–4 (1)	Tommy Noble	PTS	10	Dec 8, 1924	108th Field Artillery Armory, Philadelphia, Pennsylvania, U.S.	
70	Loss	53–12–4 (1)	Andy Martin	PTS	10	Nov 25, 1924	Infantry Hall, Providence, Rhode Island, U.S.	
69	Win	53–11–4 (1)	Tommy Noble	PTS	10	Nov 24, 1924	108th Field Artillery Armory, Philadelphia, Pennsylvania, U.S.	
68	Loss	52–11–4 (1)	Pete Sarmiento	NWS	10	Oct 20, 1924	Auditorium, Milwaukee, Wisconsin, U.S.	
67	Win	52–10–4 (1)	Terry Martin	PTS	10	Oct 3, 1924	Infantry Hall, Providence, Rhode Island, U.S.	
66	Win	51–10–4 (1)	Frankie Mandot	KO	1 (10)	Oct 1, 1924	Shibe Park, Philadelphia, Pennsylvania, U.S.	
65	Win	50–10–4 (1)	Al Markie	KO	3 (10)	Sep 8, 1924	Shibe Park, Philadelphia, Pennsylvania, U.S.	
64	Loss	49–10–4 (1)	Chick Suggs	NWS	10	Sep 5, 1924	Newport, Rhode Island, U.S.	
63	Win	49–9–4 (1)	Spencer Gardner	KO	6 (10)	Aug 20, 1924	Freebody Park, Newport, Rhode Island, U.S.	
62	Win	48–9–4 (1)	Spencer Gardner	UD	10	Jul 21, 1924	Shibe Park, Philadelphia, Pennsylvania, U.S.	
61	Win	47–9–4 (1)	Teddy Joyce	DQ	2 (8)	Jun 13, 1924	Sager's Arena, Aurora, Illinois, U.S.	
60	Win	46–9–4 (1)	Johnny Brown	KO	3 (10)	Apr 29, 1924	Arena, Philadelphia, Pennsylvania, U.S.	
59	Win	45–9–4 (1)	Sammy Craden	KO	3 (10)	Apr 25, 1924	Auditorium, Milwaukee, Wisconsin, U.S.	
58	Win	44–9–4 (1)	Young Wolgast	KO	1 (8)	Apr 15, 1924	Mechanics Building, Boston, Massachusetts, U.S.	
57	Win	43–9–4 (1)	Mickey Diamond	KO	1 (8)	Apr 7, 1924	Arena, Philadelphia, Pennsylvania, U.S.	
56	Win	42–9–4 (1)	Joey Clein	TKO	2 (10)	Apr 4, 1924	Auditorium, Milwaukee, Wisconsin, U.S.	
55	Win	41–9–4 (1)	Buck Fleming	PTS	10	Mar 14, 1924	Cambria A.C., Philadelphia, Pennsylvania, U.S.	
54	Win	40–9–4 (1)	Joe Nelson	UD	8	Feb 25, 1924	Arena, Philadelphia, Pennsylvania, U.S.	
53	Win	39–9–4 (1)	Jack Lester	KO	3 (10)	Feb 11, 1924	Arena, Philadelphia, Pennsylvania, U.S.	
52	Win	38–9–4 (1)	KO Leonard	KO	2 (10)	Jan 28, 1924	Arena, Philadelphia, Pennsylvania, U.S.	
51	Win	37–9–4 (1)	Joe Nelson	KO	2 (10)	Jan 18, 1924	Cambria A.C., Philadelphia, Pennsylvania, U.S.	
50	Win	36–9–4 (1)	Joe Nelson	PTS	10	Dec 14, 1923	Cambria A.C., Philadelphia, Pennsylvania, U.S.	
49	Loss	35–9–4 (1)	Tommy Murray	NWS	8	Nov 29, 1923	Arena, Philadelphia, Pennsylvania, U.S.	
48	Loss	35–8–4 (1)	Pete Sarmiento	NWS	8	Oct 22, 1923	Arena, Philadelphia, Pennsylvania, U.S.	
47	Win	35–7–4 (1)	Johnny Dixon	NWS	10	Aug 30, 1923	Airport, Atlantic City, New Jersey, U.S.	
46	Win	34–7–4 (1)	Eddie O'Keefe	TKO	3 (8)	Aug 16, 1923	Airport, Atlantic City, New Jersey, U.S.	
45	Win	33–7–4 (1)	Chick Kansas	NWS	8	Jul 30, 1923	Bacharach Ball Park, Atlantic City, New Jersey, U.S.	
44	Win	32–7–4 (1)	Mike Moran	NWS	8	Jun 18, 1923	Waltz Dream Arena, Atlantic City, New Jersey, U.S.	
43	Win	31–7–4 (1)	Al Gordon	NWS	8	Apr 16, 1923	Arena, Philadelphia, Pennsylvania, U.S.	
42	Loss	30–7–4 (1)	Bobby Garcia	PTS	6	Mar 1, 1923	Madison Square Garden, New York City, New York, U.S.	
41	NC	30–6–4 (1)	Kid Kansas	NC	3 (8)	Feb 27, 1923	Armory, Reading, Pennsylvania, U.S.	Declared NC because of stalling
40	Win	30–6–4	Battling Mack	NWS	8	Feb 8, 1923	Adelphia A.C., Philadelphia, Pennsylvania, U.S.	
39	Win	29–6–4	Tommy Murray	NWS	8	Dec 25, 1922	Arena, Philadelphia, Pennsylvania, U.S.	
38	Loss	28–6–4	Cuddy DeMarco	NWS	8	Dec 12, 1922	20th Century A.C., Philadelphia, Pennsylvania, U.S.	
37	Win	28–5–4	Billy Mascott	NWS	8	Nov 30, 1922	Arena, Philadelphia, Pennsylvania, U.S.	
36	Win	27–5–4	Jack Perry	NWS	8	Nov 9, 1922	Chestnut Street Arena, Philadelphia, Pennsylvania, U.S.	
35	Loss	26–5–4	Rosey Stoy	NWS	8	Oct 30, 1922	Western Market House, Lancaster, Pennsylvania, U.S.	
34	Win	26–4–4	Young Sharkey	KO	1 (8)	Oct 13, 1922	Cambria A.C., Philadelphia, Pennsylvania, U.S.	
33	Win	25–4–4	Joe McGovern	NWS	8	Aug 23, 1922	Logan A.C., Philadelphia, Pennsylvania, U.S.	
32	Win	24–4–4	Joe Nelson	NWS	8	Aug 21, 1922	Waltz Dream Arena, Atlantic City, New Jersey, U.S.	
31	Win	23–4–4	Frankie Ferro	NWS	8	Aug 18, 1922	Cambria A.C., Philadelphia, Pennsylvania, U.S.	
30	Win	22–4–4	Marty Burns	NWS	8	Jul 31, 1922	Waltz Dream Arena, Atlantic City, New Jersey, U.S.	
29	Loss	21–4–4	Jimmy Mendo	NWS	8	Jul 18, 1922	Ice Palace, Philadelphia, Pennsylvania, U.S.	
28	Loss	21–3–4	Chick Kansas	DQ	3 (6)	Jul 7, 1922	Ice Palace, Philadelphia, Pennsylvania, U.S.	
27	Win	21–2–4	Young Coster	KO	3 (6)	Jun 13, 1922	Ice Palace, Philadelphia, Pennsylvania, U.S.	
26	Win	20–2–4	Joe Bradley	KO	2 (8)	May 5, 1922	Cambria A.C., Philadelphia, Pennsylvania, U.S.	
25	Win	19–2–4	Chick Kansas	NWS	6	Apr 20, 1922	Ice Palace, Philadelphia, Pennsylvania, U.S.	
24	Win	18–2–4	Jack Lester	NWS	8	Apr 3, 1922	Waltz Dream Arena, Atlantic City, New Jersey, U.S.	
23	Win	17–2–4	Bobby McLeod	NWS	6	Mar 17, 1922	Cambria A.C., Philadelphia, Pennsylvania, U.S.	
22	Draw	16–2–4	Mickey Wolgast	NWS	6	Mar 3, 1922	Cambria A.C., Philadelphia, Pennsylvania, U.S.	
21	Win	16–2–3	Sailor Joe Kelly	NWS	6	Feb 20, 1922	Cambria A.C., Philadelphia, Pennsylvania, U.S.	
20	Loss	15–2–3	Tommy Murray	NWS	6	Jan 16, 1922	Olympia A.C., Philadelphia, Pennsylvania, U.S.	
19	Win	15–1–3	Terry Hanlon	NWS	8	Jan 13, 1922	Cambria A.C., Philadelphia, Pennsylvania, U.S.	
18	Win	14–1–3	Joe Bradley	KO	4 (8)	Jan 12, 1922	Auditorium A.A., Philadelphia, Pennsylvania, U.S.	
17	Loss	13–1–3	Billy Devine	NWS	6	Dec 12, 1921	Olympia A.C., Philadelphia, Pennsylvania, U.S.	
16	Win	13–0–3	Tommy Gorman	KO	2 (8)	Dec 2, 1921	Cambria A.C., Philadelphia, Pennsylvania, U.S.	
15	Win	12–0–3	Sailor Joe Kelly	NWS	4	Nov 23, 1921	Bijou Theater, Philadelphia, Pennsylvania, U.S.	
14	Win	11–0–3	Whitey Langdon	KO	6 (8)	Nov 18, 1921	Cambria A.C., Philadelphia, Pennsylvania, U.S.	
13	Win	10–0–3	Leo Vincent	NWS	6	Oct 20, 1921	Ice Palace, Philadelphia, Pennsylvania, U.S.	
12	Win	9–0–3	Bobby Allen	TKO	3 (6)	Oct 10, 1921	Olympia A.C., Philadelphia, Pennsylvania, U.S.	
11	Win	8–0–3	Leo Reynolds	TKO	3 (6)	Sep 24, 1921	National A.C., Philadelphia, Pennsylvania, U.S.	
10	Draw	7–0–3	Sailor Joe Kelly	NWS	8	May 3, 1921	Auditorium A.A., Philadelphia, Pennsylvania, U.S.	
9	Draw	7–0–2	Johnny Royce	NWS	8	Apr 26, 1921	Auditorium A.A., Philadelphia, Pennsylvania, U.S.	
8	Win	7–0–1	Harry Roth	KO	2 (6)	Apr 9, 1921	National A.C., Philadelphia, Pennsylvania, U.S.	
7	Win	6–0–1	Willie Tasker	KO	2 (6)	Apr 5, 1921	Auditorium A.A., Philadelphia, Pennsylvania, U.S.	
6	Win	5–0–1	Young Joe Tuber	NWS	6	Apr 2, 1921	Auditorium A.A., Philadelphia, Pennsylvania, U.S.	
5	Win	4–0–1	Sailor Joe Kelly	NWS	6	Mar 22, 1921	Auditorium A.A., Philadelphia, Pennsylvania, U.S.	
4	Win	3–0–1	Young Joe Tuber	NWS	6	Mar 8, 1921	Auditorium A.A., Philadelphia, Pennsylvania, U.S.	
3	Draw	2–0–1	Jimmy Monroe	NWS	8	Mar 2, 1921	National A.C., Philadelphia, Pennsylvania, U.S.	
2	Win	2–0	Matty Dechter	NWS	6	Jan 29, 1921	National A.C., Philadelphia, Pennsylvania, U.S.	
1	Win	1–0	Jack Martin	KO	1 (6)	Dec 2, 1919	Gayety Theater, Philadelphia, Pennsylvania, U.S.	

== Titles in boxing ==
=== Major world titles ===
- NBA (WBA) featherweight champion (Note: Inaugural champion.) (126 lbs)
- NYSAC super featherweight champion (130 lbs)
- NBA (WBA) super featherweight champion (130 lbs)

=== The Ring magazine titles ===
- The Ring super featherweight champion (130 lbs)

=== Regional/International titles ===
- Pennsylvania State featherweight champion (126 lbs)
- Pennsylvania State lightweight champion (135 lbs)

=== Undisputed titles ===
- Undisputed super featherweight champion

== See also ==
- List of super featherweight boxing champions
- List of select Jewish boxers

== Notes and references ==
=== References ===
Achievements
Inaugural Champion	NBA World Featherweight Champion; September 12, 1927 – February 10, 1928	Succeeded by Tony Canzoneri
Preceded by Tod Morgan	World Junior Lightweight Champion; December 20, 1929 – July 15, 1931	Succeeded by Kid Chocolate
