= Boxing in the 1930s =

The sport of boxing in the 1930s was affected by one of the biggest economic struggles in the history of the United States: the depression era. Because of the suffering American economy, many boxers were offered lower amounts of money causing them to only box for passion. When the decade began, the world Heavyweight title belonged to no one. The sport of boxing suffered because of the lack of money to pay the boxers.

The Heavyweights, from 1930 to 1937 in particular, could be compared to the Heavyweight division of the 1980s. Six champions were crowned before Joe Louis began his legendary run as Heavyweight champion in 1937. He retired in 1949, still holding the title of world Heavyweight champion.

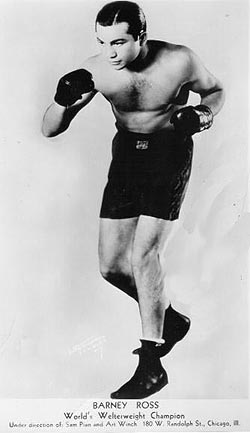
Barney Ross

Boxing began expanding into Latin America in the 1930s: Sixto Escobar became the first world champion from Puerto Rico by defeating Baby Casanova. Baby Arizmendi conquered the first world title for Mexico in 1934. For his part, Kid Chocolate became the first world champion from Cuba.

Three world champions won world titles in three different divisions, a feat no single fighter had accomplished since 1903; Tony Canzoneri, Barney Ross and Henry Armstrong cemented their place in boxing history by achieving this feat. Armstrong was the first and only world champion to reign in three divisions at the same time; modern boxing rules ban boxers from holding the title in more than one division at a time.

== 1930 ==
- February 10 – In the decade's first world title fight, Jimmy Slattery becomes world Light-Heavyweight champion, beating Lou Scozza by decision in fifteen rounds for the vacant title, at Buffalo.
- February 18 – Jack Kid Berg becomes world Jr. Welterweight champion, knocking out Mushy Callahan in ten rounds, London, England
- March 21 – Midget Wolgast wins the vacant New York Flyweight title with a decision over Black Bill, New York City.
- June 11 – Max Schmeling wins the undisputed world Heavyweight title, defeating Jack Sharkey by a four-round disqualification, after being hit with a damaging low blow. Schmeling became the first boxer to win the title by disqualification, and he remains as of 2017, the only one to win it that way, in New York.
- June 25 – Maxie Rosenbloom wins the world Light-Heavyweight title with a fifteen-round decision over Jimmy Slattery, in Buffalo.
- July 17 – Al Singer wins the world Lightweight title with a first-round knockout over Sammy Mandell, setting a record for the fastest fight in that division's history, New York.
- October 4 – Panama Al Brown retains the world Bantamweight title with a fifteen-round decision over Eugene Huat, in Paris.
- November 14 – Tony Canzoneri wins his second world title, knocking out Al Singer (who in the process became the first world boxing champion in history to both win and lose the title by first-round knockout) in the first round and breaking Singer's record for the fastest finish in a world Lightweight title fight, in New York.
- December 11 – Battling Battalino retains the world Featherweight title with a fifteen-round decision over Kid Chocolate, in New York.
- December 25 – Frankie Genaro and Midget Wolgast try to unify the world Flyweight title, but their fight results in a draw, in New York.

== 1931 ==
- April 24 – Tony Canzoneri becomes the second man to win world titles in three divisions, and the first one since Bob Fitzsimmons in the 19th century, by knocking out Jack Kid Berg in round three to win the world's Jr. Welterweight title, in Chicago.
- 22 May – Battling Battalino retains his world Featherweight title, with a ten-round decision over Fidel LaBarba, in New York City.
- July 3 – Max Schmeling retains the world Heavyweight title, with a fifteenth-round knockout of Young Stribling, in Cleveland.
- July 15 – Kid Chocolate becomes Cuba's first world boxing champion in history, knocking out world Jr. Lightweight champion Benny Bass in seven rounds, at Philadelphia.
- July 23 – Battling Battalino retains the world Featherweight title with a ten-round decision over future world champion Freddie Miller, at Cincinnati.
- August 5 – Maxie Rosenbloom retains his world Light-Heavyweight title with a fifteen-round decision over former world champion Jimmy Slattery, at their New York rematch.
- September 10 – Tony Canzoneri retains both his Jr. Welterweight and Lightweight world belts, with a fifteen-round unanimous decision over former world champion Jack Berg, at their New York rematch.
- October 26 – Young Perez becomes the first world champion from Tunisia when he beats Frankie Genaro by knockout in round two at Paris, France, for the National Boxing Association's world Flyweight title.
- October 27 – Panama Al Brown retains his world Bantamweight title with a fifteen-round decision over Eugene Huat at their rematch, which took place in Montreal, Canada.
- November 20 – Tony Canzoneri retains his world Lightweight title by a fifteen-round decision over world Jr. Lightweight champion Kid Chocolate, in New York.

== 1932 ==
- January 18 – Johnny Jadick wins the world Jr. Welterweight title, defeating Tony Canzoneri by a fifteen-round decision, at Philadelphia.
- January 25 – Gorilla Jones knocks out Oddone Piazza in six rounds to win the vacant world Middleweight title, at Milwaukee
- January 28 – Jackie Fields defeats Lou Brouillard by decision in ten rounds to win the world Welterweight title, at Chicago.
- June 21 – Jack Sharkey wins the world Heavyweight title, defeating Max Schmeling by a fifteen-round decision, at their rematch held in New York City.
- June 11 – In a controversial fight, Marcel Thil wins the world Middleweight title with an eleventh round disqualification over Gorilla Jones, in Paris, France. In front of an audience that included Amelia Earhart, Jones is disqualified for continuous low hitting and holding.
- July 18 – Johnny Jadick retains his world Jr. Welterweight title with a second ten-round decision win over Tony Canzoneri, at Philadelphia.
- October 7 – Benny Leonard's last fight, as the former world Lightweight champion gets knocked out in six rounds by Jimmy McLarnin, in New York.
- November 4 – Tony Canzoneri retains his world Lightweight title with a fifteen-round decision over Billy Petrolle, at New York.
- December 9 – Kid Chocolate retains his world Featherweight title with a fifteen-round decision over Fidel LaBarba, in New York.

== 1933 ==
- February 20 – Battling Shaw wins the world Jr. welterweight title with a ten-round decision over Johnny Jadick, New Orleans.
- February 21 – Young Corbett III wins the world Welterweight title, defeating Jackie Fields by a ten-round decision, in San Francisco.
- 21 May – Tony Canzoneri recovers his world Jr. Welterweight title, with a ten-round decision over Battling Shaw, in New Orleans.
- June 23 – Barney Ross beats Tony Canzoneri to claim both the world Lightweight and Jr. Welterweight titles held by Canzoneri, by a ten-round decision, in Chicago.
- June 29 – Primo Carnera initiates one of boxing's most controversial reigns in the history of the Heavyweight division, knocking out world champion Jack Sharkey in six rounds at New York City. It has been widely rumored since that many of Carnera's fights were fixed.
- September 12 – Barney Ross retains his world Lightweight and Jr. Weltwerweight titles with a fifteen-round decision over Tony Canzoneri, at New York.
- October 21 – Paulino Uzcudun unsuccessfully tries to become the first Hispanic world Heavyweight champion, losing a fifteen-round decision to Primo Carnera, in Rome, Italy.
- December 25 – Frankie Klick wins the world Jr. Lightweight title, knocking out world champion Kid Chocolate, in seven rounds, at Philadelphia.

== 1934 ==
- March 1 – Primo Carnera retains the world Heavyweight title with a fifteen-round decision over world Light-Heavyweight champion Tommy Loughran, at Miami.
- March 5 – Barney Ross retains his world Lightweight title with a ten-round draw over world Jr. Lightweight champion Frankie Klick, in San Francisco.
- March 27 – Barney Ross retains the world Jr. Welterweight title with a ten-round decision over Bobby Pacho, in Los Angeles.
- 28 May – Barney Ross becomes the third man in boxing history to win world titles in three different divisions, defeating Jimmy McLarnin for the world Welterweight title by a fifteen-round decision in New York City.
- June 14 – Max Baer drops defending world Heavyweight champion Primo Carnera eleven times en route to an eleventh-round knockout, winning the world Heavyweight title, at New York.
- June 26 – Sixto Escobar becomes Puerto Rico's first world champion in history, knocking out Baby Casanova in nine rounds to win the vacant National Boxing Association's Bantamweight title, in Montreal, Canada.
- September 17 – Jimmy McLarnin recovers the world Welterweight title, with a fifteen-round decision over Barney Ross, in New York.
- December 10 – Barney Ross retains his world Jr. Welterweight title in a rematch against Bobby Pacho, by a twelve-round decision, in Cleveland.

== 1935 ==
- January 1 – Baby Arizmendi becomes the first world champion from Mexico in boxing history by outpointing Henry Armstrong by in twelve rounds to win the vacant California and Mexico-recognized world Lightweight titles, Mexico City, Mexico.
- 10 May – Tony Canzoneri recovers the world Lightweight title, winning the belt left vacant by Barney Ross, with a fifteen-round unanimous decision over Lou Ambers, in New York City.
- 28 May – Barney Ross recovers the world Welterweight title, defeating Jimmy McLarnin with a fifteen-round unanimous decision in the third and final installment of their rivalry, at New York. Former world Heavyweight champion Jack Dempsey refereed.
- June 13 – James J. Braddock, with 24 losses, produces one of the biggest upsets in world Heavyweight championship history, defeating world champion Max Baer to take the world title, by a fifteen-round unanimous decision, in New York.
- August 26 – Lou Salica wins the National Boxing Association world Bantamweight title with a fifteen-round decision over Sixto Escobar, at New York.
- September 9- – Benny Lynch wins the N.B.A.'s world Flyweight title with a second-round knockout over Jackie Brown, in Manchester, England.
- November 15 – In their rematch, Sixto Escobar recovers the N.B.A.'s world Bantamweight title with a fifteen-round decision over Lou Salica, at New York.

== 1936 ==
- January 20 – Marcel Thil retains the world Middleweight title by a fourth round disqualification against Lou Brouillard, Paris, France.
- March 13 – John Henry Lewis retains the world Light-Heavyweight title with a fifteen-round decision over Jock McAvoy, in New York City.
- June 19 – In the start of their legendary boxing rivalry, former world Heavyweight champion Max Schmeling inflicts Joe Louis' first defeat, with a twelve-round knockout, in New York.
- August 4 – Henry Armstrong becomes world champion for the first time, beating Baby Arizmendi by a ten-round decision in Los Angeles, to take the Californian and Mexican world Lightweight titles.
- August 31 – Sixto Escobar unifies the world Bantamweight title, with a thirteenth-round knockout win over Tony Marino, at New York.
- October 13 – Sixto Escobar retains the world Bantamweight title, with a first-round knockout over Indian Quintana, in New York.
- November 9 – John Henry Lewis retains the world Light-Heavyweight title with a fifteen-round decision over Len Harvey, in London.

== 1937 ==
- January 1 – Freddie Steele retains his National Boxing Association world Middleweight title with a ten-round decision win over former world champion Gorilla Jones, in Milwaukee, Wisconsin.
- January 19 – In a rematch, Benny Lynch retains the world Flyweight title with a fifteen-round decision over Small Montana, in London.
- February 21 – At their rubber match, Sixto Escobar retains his world Bantamweight title with a fifteen-round decision victory over Lou Salica in San Juan, Puerto Rico. It is also the first world title fight ever held in Puerto Rico.
- 7 May – Lou Ambers retains his world Lightweight title with a fifteen-round decision over former champion Tony Canzoneri, at their New York City rematch.
- June 3 – John Henry Lewis retains his world Light-Heavyweight championship with an eighth-round knockout of former world champion Bob Olin in St. Louis.
- June 21 – Joe Louis becomes Heavyweight champion of the world, knocking out James J. Braddock in round eight, at Chicago. The new champion then says he won't consider himself a champion until he beats Max Schmeling in a rematch.
- August 30 – In his first defense of the world Heavyweight title, Joe Louis meets stiff competition from Tommy Farr, but he still manages to retain the title by a fifteen-round unanimous decision, at New York.
- September 23 – A world title fight marathon in New York City: Harry Jeffra beats Sixto Escobar by decision in fifteen rounds to win the world Bantamweight title; Lou Ambers defeats Pedro Montañez by decision in fifteen to retain the world's Lightweight title; Barney Ross defeats future world Middleweight champion Ceferino Garcia by decision in ten to retain the world Jr. Welterweight title and Fred Apostoli knocks out Marcel Thil in ten rounds to win the world Middleweight title.
- October 29 – Henry Armstrong wins his second simultaneous title, the world Featherweight title (to go along with the world Lightweight championship as recognized by California and Mexico), knocking out defending world champion Petey Sarron in six rounds, at New York.

== 1938 ==
- February 20 – Sixto Escobar regains the world Bantamweight title, beating Harry Jeffra by a fifteen-round decision at their San Juan, Puerto Rico rematch.
- 31 May – Henry Armstrong makes history by becoming the first man in the history of boxing to hold world titles in three divisions at the same time, defeating world Welterweight champion Barney Ross by a fifteen-round split decision, at New York City.
- June 22 – In the second fight of their famous rivalry, Joe Louis retains the world Heavyweight title with a first-round knockout of former world champion Max Schmeling, at New York.
- June 29 – Benny Lynch retains the world Flyweight title with a twelve-round knockout over Peter Kane in Paisley, Scotland, then retires.
- September 22 – Peter Kane conquers the vacant world Flyweight title with a fifteen-round decision over Jackie Jurich, in Liverpool, England.

== 1939 ==
- January 10 – Henry Armstrong begins what would be a run of 20 successful title defenses of his world Welterweight title in the same year, defeating Baby Arizmendi by a ten-round decision, in Los Angeles.
- January 25 – Joe Louis retains the world Heavyweight title with a first-round knockout of world Light-Heavyweight champion John Henry Lewis in the first round, in New York City. It would be Lewis; last career fight, as it was later discovered that he had been fighting while suffering cataracts since 1936.
- April 1 – Sixto Escobar defeats KO Morgan by a fifteen-round decision to retain the world Bantamweight title, in San Juan, Puerto Rico.
- June 28 – Joe Louis recovers from a third round knockdown and retains his world Heavyweight title, knocking out Tony Galento in round four, at New York.
- July 13 – Billy Conn defeats Melio Bettina by decision in fifteen rounds to win the vacant world Light-Heavyweight title, in Pittsburgh.
- August 21 – Lou Ambers defeats Henry Armstrong to regain the world Lightweight title, with a fifteen-round unanimous decision, at New York.
- October 2 – Ceferino Garcia wins the world Middleweight title, knocking out Fred Apostoli in seven rounds, at New York.
- November 17 – Billy Conn retains the world Light-Heavyweight championship with a fifteen-round decision over Gus Lesvenich, in New York.
- December 11 – Henry Armstrong defends his world Welterweight title for the eleventh time in 1939, defeating Jimmy Garrison by a knockout in round seven, at Cleveland. decides to retire
