= Bobby Pacho =

American boxer (1911–1978)

Personal information
- Nickname: Kid Mexico
- Born: Robert Pacho; August 1, 1911 Yuma, Arizona, U.S.
- Died: May 1, 1978 (aged 66) Cleveland, Ohio, U.S.
- Height: 5 ft 6 in (168 cm)
- Weight: Lightweight; Light welterweight Welterweight

Boxing career
- Reach: 66 in (168 cm)
- Stance: Orthodox

Boxing record
- Total fights: 224
- Wins: 130
- Win by KO: 67
- Losses: 71
- Draws: 23

Robert Pacho (August 1, 1911 – May 1, 1978) was an American professional boxer who competed from 1928 to 1941. He held the California State Athletic Commission lightweight title from 1931 to 1932 and twice challenged for the world light welterweight title in 1934 and the world welterweight title in 1939. Following the end of Bert Colima's career, Pacho became the most popular boxer among Mexican fans.

== Early life ==
Pacho broke into the professional boxing ranks while working as a farm mechanic in El Centro, California.

== Professional career ==
Pacho was ranked among the top ten lightweights in the world by The Ring magazine from December 1931 to December 1932, reaching as high as No. 9. He later earned a top-ten ranking at welterweight from October 1934 to July 1937, peaking at No. 3.

Pacho captured the only professional title of his career on August 11, 1931, when he defeated Tod Morgan to win the California State Athletic Commission lightweight title. He successfully defended the title against Hector McDonald on December 1, scoring a sixth-round technical knockout after the referee stopped the bout when McDonald's eye became completely swollen shut.

Pacho lost the title to Young Peter Jackson on December 27, 1932, suffering a tenth-round knockout. After the two had traded vicious blows throughout the bout, Jackson unleashed a powerful right hand that knocked Pacho out.

On March 27, 1934, Pacho challenged Barney Ross for the world light welterweight title. Despite turning in a sensational performance, Pacho ultimately lost by decision. The two met again on December 10, but the rematch proved far more one-sided, with Ross comfortably outpointing Pacho over 12 rounds.

On March 4, 1939, Pacho challenged Henry Armstrong for the world welterweight title in Havana, losing by fourth-round technical knockout. The two met in a rematch in Denver on October 30, with Armstrong again prevailing by fourth-round stoppage.

Pacho notably faced three three-division world champions during his career—Tony Canzoneri, Barney Ross, and Henry Armstrong—fighting each of them twice. He also fought world champions Ceferino Garcia four times and Fritzie Zivic twice. His professional career spanned from 1928 to 1941, and he retired with a record of 130 wins, 71 losses, and 23 draws, including 67 victories by knockout.

== Professional boxing record ==
224 fights	130 wins	71 losses
By knockout	67	8
By decision	63	63
Draws	23	

No.	Result	Record	Opponent	Type	Round, time	Date	Location	Notes
224	Loss	130–71–23	Ceferino Garcia	KO	3 (10)	Aug 19, 1941	Ryan's Auditorium, Fresno, California, U.S.	
223	Loss	130–70–23	Shorty Hogue	PTS	10	Aug 8, 1941	Coliseum, San Diego, California, U.S.	
222	Loss	130–69–23	Everett Jure	PTS	10	Jul 4, 1941	Pismo Beach Arena, Pismo Beach, California, U.S.	
221	Win	130–68–23	Kid Lester	TKO	8 (10)	Jun 11, 1941	San Bernardino A.C., San Bernardino, California, U.S.	
220	Win	129–68–23	Baby Face Robinson	PTS	10	Mar 7, 1941	Riverside Auditorium, Tucson, Arizona, U.S.	
219	Loss	128–68–23	Freddie Dixon	PTS	10	Jan 17, 1941	Legion Arena, Phoenix, Arizona, U.S.	
218	Draw	128–67–23	Kid Azteca	PTS	10	Dec 13, 1940	Municipal Auditorium, San Antonio, Texas, U.S.	
217	Draw	128–67–22	Flashy Sebastian	PTS	10	Oct 29, 1940	Memorial Civic Auditorium, Stockton, California	
216	Loss	128–67–21	Sheik Rangel	PTS	10	Oct 25, 1940	National Hall, San Francisco, California, U.S.	
215	Loss	128–66–21	Aaron Wade	TKO	6 (10)	Sep 30, 1940	Coliseum Bowl, San Francisco, California, U.S.	
214	Loss	128–65–21	Fred Apostoli	PTS	10	Sep 16, 1940	Coliseum Bowl, San Francisco, California, U.S.	
213	Loss	128–64–21	Otto Blackwell	PTS	10	Aug 21, 1940	Wilmington Bowl, Wilmington, California, U.S.	
212	Loss	128–63–21	Sheik Rangel	PTS	10	Jul 9, 1940	Ryan's Auditorium, Fresno, California, U.S.	
211	Win	128–62–21	Otto Blackwell	TKO	4 (6)	Jun 25, 1940	Olympic Auditorium, Los Angeles, California, U.S.	
210	Loss	127–62–21	Johnny Jackson	PTS	6	May 7, 1940	Olympic Auditorium, Los Angeles, California, U.S.	
209	Loss	127–61–21	Johnny Jackson	PTS	6	Apr 23, 1940	Olympic Auditorium, Los Angeles, California, U.S.	
208	Draw	127–60–21	Mario Duccini	PTS	6	Apr 19, 1940	L-st Arena, Sacramento, California, U.S.	
207	Loss	127–60–20	Eddie Booker	PTS	10	Apr 9, 1940	Civic Auditorium, San Jose, California, U.S.	
206	Loss	127–59–20	Shorty Hogue	PTS	8	Mar 25, 1940	Ocean Park Arena, Santa Monica, California, U.S.	
205	Win	127–58–20	Doll Nelson	TKO	5 (8)	Mar 4, 1940	Ocean Park Arena, Santa Monica, California, U.S.	
204	Win	126–58–20	Jimmy Casino	PTS	10	Jan 23, 1940	Olympic Auditorium, Los Angeles, California, U.S.	
203	Loss	125–58–20	Shorty Hogue	PTS	10	Jan 12, 1940	Coliseum, San Diego, California, U.S.	
202	Win	125–57–20	Aaron Al Smith	PTS	10	Dec 26, 1939	Olympic Auditorium, Los Angeles, California, U.S.	
201	Loss	124–57–20	Eddie Booker	PTS	10	Dec 18, 1939	National Hall, San Francisco, California, U.S.	
200	Loss	124–56–20	Henry Armstrong	TKO	4 (15)	Oct 30, 1939	Municipal Auditorium, Denver, Colorado, U.S.	For NYSAC, NBA, and The Ring welterweight titles
199	Loss	124–55–20	Turkey Thompson	PTS	10	Sep 12, 1939	Olympic Auditorium, Los Angeles, California, U.S.	
198	Loss	124–54–20	Leon Zorrita	PTS	10	Sep 4, 1939	Mission A.C., Santa Barbara, California, U.S.	
197	Loss	124–53–20	Ceferino Garcia	KO	5 (10)	Aug 8, 1939	Olympic Auditorium, Los Angeles, California, U.S.	
196	Draw	124–52–20	Freddie Dixon	PTS	10	Jul 21, 1939	Madison Square Garden, Phoenix, Arizona, U.S.	
195	Win	124–52–19	O'Dell Mason	KO	3 (10)	Jul 11, 1939	Riverview Bowl, Yuma, Arizona, U.S.	
194	Loss	123–52–19	Ceferino Garcia	PTS	10	Jul 4, 1939	Civic Auditorium, Stockton, California, U.S.	
193	Loss	123–51–19	Big Boy Hogue	PTS	6	Jun 22, 1939	El Centro Arena, El Centro, California, U.S.	
192	Win	123–50–19	Hut Thompson	TKO	2 (10)	Jun 16, 1939	Madison Square Garden, Phoenix, Arizona, U.S.	
191	Win	122–50–19	Glen Lee	PTS	10	Jun 13, 1939	Olympic Auditorium, Los Angeles, California, U.S.	
190	Win	121–50–19	Art Johnson	KO	1 (10)	Jun 5, 1939	Mission A.C., Santa Barbara, California, U.S.	
189	Win	120–50–19	Herman Graves	PTS	10	May 26, 1939	Coliseum, San Diego, California, U.S.	
188	Win	119–50–19	Art Johnson	KO	2 (10)	May 18, 1939	El Centro A.C., El Centro, California	
187	Win	118–50–19	Herman Graves	PTS	10	Apr 27, 1939	El Centro Arena, El Centro, California, U.S.	
186	Win	117–50–19	Carlos Garcia	KO	4 (10)	Apr 3, 1939	Mission A.C., Santa Barbara, California, U.S.	
185	Loss	116–50–19	Louis Flyer	PTS	10	Mar 28, 1939	Olympic Auditorium, Los Angeles, California, U.S.	
184	Loss	116–49–19	Henry Armstrong	TKO	4 (15)	Mar 4, 1939	Tropical Stadium, Havana, Cuba	For NYSAC, NBA, and The Ring welterweight titles
183	Loss	116–48–19	Tony Canzoneri	PTS	10	Feb 7, 1939	Olympic Auditorium, Los Angeles, California, U.S.	
182	Win	116–47–19	Charlie Baxter	TKO	2 (10)	Dec 20, 1938	Olympic Auditorium, Los Angeles, California, U.S.	
181	Win	115–47–19	Johnny Stevens	TKO	3 (10)	Dec 6, 1938	Olympic Auditorium, Los Angeles, California, U.S.	
180	Draw	114–47–19	Dick Ritchie	TD	6 (10)	Nov 25, 1938	Coliseum, San Diego, California, U.S.	
179	Win	114–47–18	Tommy Howell	TKO	9 (10)	Oct 24, 1938	Marigold Gardens, Chicago, Illinois, U.S.	
178	Loss	113–47–18	Salvy Saban	PTS	8	Oct 11, 1938	New York Coliseum, The Bronx, New York City, New York, U.S.	
177	Loss	113–46–18	Steve Mamakos	PTS	10	Sep 27, 1938	Griffith Stadium, Washington, D.C., U.S.	
176	Loss	113–45–18	Fritzie Zivic	PTS	10	Sep 13, 1938	Meadowbrook Bowl, Newark, New Jersey, U.S.	
175	Win	113–44–18	Tony Petroskey	PTS	10	Aug 29, 1938	Marigold Gardens Outdoor Arena, Chicago, Illinois, U.S.	
174	Loss	112–44–18	Michele Palermo	PTS	10	Aug 4, 1938	Fort Hamilton Arena, Brooklyn, New York City, U.S.	
173	Win	112–43–18	Spider Hewitt	PTS	10	Jul 14, 1938	Fort Hamilton Arena, Brooklyn, New York City, U.S.	
172	Loss	111–43–18	Salvy Saban	PTS	10	Jul 5, 1938	Dyckman Oval, Manhattan, New York City, U.S.	
171	Win	111–42–18	Mickey Paul	PTS	10	Jun 20, 1938	Dyckman Oval, Manhattan, New York City, U.S.	
170	Loss	110–42–18	Milt Aron	UD	10	May 31, 1938	Marigold Gardens Outdoor Arena, Chicago, Illinois, U.S.	
169	Win	110–41–18	Eddie Conley	KO		May 16, 1938	St. Nicholas Arena, Manhattan, New York City, U.S.	
168	Win	109–41–18	Spider Hewitt	PTS	10	Apr 19, 1938	Broadway Arena, Brooklyn, New York City, U.S.	
167	Draw	108–41–18	Pete DeRuzza	PTS	10	Apr 11, 1938	St. Nicholas Arena, Manhattan, New York City, U.S.	
166	Loss	108–41–17	Leonard Bennett	PTS	10	Mar 7, 1938	Motor Square Garden, Pittsburgh, Pennsylvania, U.S.	
165	Loss	108–40–17	Werther Arcelli	PTS	10	Feb 28, 1938	St. Nicholas Arena, Manhattan, New York City, U.S.	
164	Win	108–39–17	Sammy Luftspring	SD	10	Feb 7, 1938	Maple Leaf Gardens, Toronto, Ontario, Canada	
163	Loss	107–39–17	Sammy Fuller	MD	10	Dec 17, 1937	Boston Garden, Boston, Massachusetts, U.S.	
162	Win	107–38–17	George Daly	PTS	10	Dec 6, 1937	Royal Windsor Palace, Manhattan, New York City, U.S.	
161	Loss	106–38–17	Ralph Zannelli	SD	10	Nov 12, 1937	Boston Garden, Boston, Massachusetts, U.S.	
160	Win	106–37–17	Phil Furr	PTS	8	Nov 1, 1937	Royal Windsor Palace, Manhattan, New York City, U.S.	
159	Win	105–37–17	Frankie Cavanna	PTS	8	Oct 18, 1937	Royal Windsor Palace, Manhattan, New York City, U.S.	
158	Win	104–37–17	Vince Pimpinella	PTS	8	Oct 9, 1937	Ridgewood Grove, Brooklyn, New York City, U.S.	
157	Win	103–37–17	Harry Rubin	PTS	8	Sep 13, 1937	Arena Stadium, Philadelphia, Pennsylvania, U.S.	
156	Loss	102–37–17	Leonard Del Genio	PTS	10	Aug 5, 1937	Madison Square Garden, Manhattan, New York City, U.S.	
155	Loss	102–36–17	Ceferino Garcia	TKO	9	Jul 22, 1937	Madison Square Garden, Manhattan, New York City, U.S.	
154	Win	102–35–17	Lew Raymond	TKO	6	Jun 29, 1937	Coney Island Velodrome, Brooklyn, New York City, U.S.	
153	Win	101–35–17	Salvy Saban	PTS	10	Jun 17, 1937	Madison Square Garden, Manhattan, New York City, U.S.	
152	Win	100–35–17	Joey Greb	TKO	6	May 24, 1937	St. Nicholas Arena, Manhattan, New York City, U.S.	
151	Draw	99–35–17	Salvy Saban	PTS	8	Apr 26, 1937	St. Nicholas Arena, Manhattan, New York City, U.S.	
150	Loss	99–35–16	Holman Williams	UD	10	Apr 19, 1937	Motor Square Garden, Pittsburgh, Pennsylvania, U.S.	
149	Win	99–34–16	Dewey Anderson	KO	2 (8)	Apr 6, 1937	Braddock Arena, Jersey City, New Jersey, U.S.	
148	Win	98–34–16	Bucky Jones	KO	2 (8)	Mar 29, 1937	St. Nicholas Arena, Manhattan, New York City, U.S.	
147	Loss	97–34–16	Andre Jessurun	PTS	8	Mar 15, 1937	St. Nicholas Arena, Manhattan, New York City, U.S.	
146	Loss	97–33–16	Fritzie Zivic	SD	10	Mar 1, 1937	Motor Square Garden, Pittsburgh, Pennsylvania, U.S.	
145	Win	97–32–16	Bobby Wilson	PTS	10	Feb 9, 1937	Broadway Arena, Brooklyn, New York City, U.S.	
144	Win	96–32–16	Johnny Alba	KO	1 (10)	Feb 2, 1937	Braddock Arena, Jersey City, New Jersey, U.S.	
143	Win	95–32–16	Frankie Blair	PTS	8	Jan 8, 1937	Madison Square Garden, Manhattan, New York City, U.S.	
142	Win	94–32–16	Joe Pennino	PTS	8	Dec 26, 1936	Ridgewood Grove, Brooklyn, New York City, U.S.	
141	Win	93–32–16	Pete Mascia	TKO	6 (8)	Dec 14, 1936	St. Nicholas Arena, Manhattan, New York City, U.S.	
140	Win	92–32–16	Ray Napolitano	PTS	8	Nov 30, 1936	St. Nicholas Arena, Manhattan, New York City, U.S.	
139	Win	91–32–16	Nick Pastore	TKO	3 (8)	Nov 23, 1936	St. Nicholas Arena, Manhattan, New York City, U.S.	
138	Loss	90–32–16	Kid Moro	PTS	10	Sep 18, 1936	Civic Auditorium, Honolulu, Hawaii, U.S.	
137	Draw	90–31–16	Gaston LeCadre	PTS	10	Aug 5, 1936	Civic Auditorium, San Francisco, California, U.S.	
136	Loss	90–31–15	Glen Lee	PTS	10	Jul 21, 1936	Olympic Auditorium, Los Angeles, California, U.S.	
135	Win	90–30–15	Frankie Wallace	RTD	7 (10)	May 1, 1936	Legion Stadium, Hollywood, California, U.S.	
134	Loss	89–30–15	Pedro Montañez	UD	10	Mar 23, 1936	St. Nicholas Arena, Manhattan, New York City, U.S.	
133	Loss	89–29–15	Wesley Ramey	PTS	10	Mar 4, 1936	Civic Auditorium, Grand Rapids, Michigan, U.S.	
132	Win	89–28–15	Cleto Locatelli	TKO	8 (10)	Jan 17, 1936	Madison Square Garden, Manhattan, New York City, U.S.	
131	Win	88–28–15	Leonard Del Genio	PTS	10	Jan 3, 1936	Madison Square Garden, Manhattan, New York City, U.S.	
130	Draw	87–28–15	Wesley Ramey	PTS	10	Nov 8, 1935	Civic Auditorium, Grand Rapids, Michigan, U.S.	
129	Loss	87–28–14	Wesley Ramey	PTS	10	Oct 11, 1935	Civic Auditorium, Grand Rapids, Michigan, U.S.	
128	Win	87–27–14	Eddie McGeever	KO	3 (10)	Oct 4, 1935	Chicago Stadium, Chicago, Illinois, U.S.	
127	Loss	86–27–14	Frankie Wallace	PTS	10	Sep 26, 1935	Arena, St. Louis, Missouri, U.S.	
126	Loss	86–26–14	Harry Carlton	UD	10	Sep 9, 1935	Marigold Gardens Outdoor Arena, Chicago, Illinois, U.S.	
125	Win	86–25–14	Gene Higgins	KO	3 (10)	Aug 20, 1935	Western Stadium, Chicago, Illinois, U.S.	
124	Loss	85–25–14	Tony Canzoneri	PTS	10	Jul 25, 1935	Mills Stadium, Chicago, Illinois, U.S.	
123	Win	85–24–14	Frankie Sagilio	PTS	10	Jul 2, 1935	Comiskey Park, Chicago, Illinois, U.S.	
122	Loss	84–24–14	Steve Halaiko	PTS	10	Jun 24, 1935	Dexter Park Arena, Woodhaven, Queens, New York City, U.S.	
121	Draw	84–23–14	Steve Halaiko	PTS	8	Jun 11, 1935	Dexter Park Arena, Woodhaven, Queens, New York City, U.S.	
120	Win	84–23–13	Jimmy Brady	KO	5 (8)	May 10, 1935	Madison Square Garden, Manhattan, New York City, U.S.	
119	Win	83–23–13	Johnny Morro	PTS	8	Apr 29, 1935	St. Nicholas Arena, Manhattan, New York City, U.S.	
118	Draw	82–23–13	Leonard Del Genio	PTS	8	Apr 15, 1935	St. Nicholas Arena, Manhattan, New York City, U.S.	
117	Win	82–23–12	Joey Zodda	PTS	8	Apr 8, 1935	St. Nicholas Arena, Manhattan, New York City, U.S.	
116	Win	81–23–12	Eddie Marks	PTS	8	Apr 1, 1935	St. Nicholas Arena, Manhattan, New York City, U.S.	
115	Win	80–23–12	Harry Carlton	PTS	10	Mar 14, 1935	Foot Guard Hall, Hartford, Connecticut, U.S.	
114	Loss	79–23–12	Davey Day	SD	10	Feb 21, 1935	Coliseum, Chicago, Illinois, U.S.	
113	Loss	79–22–12	Al Casimini	SD	8	Feb 11, 1935	St. Nicholas Arena, Manhattan, New York City, U.S.	
112	Loss	79–21–12	Lew Massey	UD	8	Jan 25, 1935	Madison Square Garden, Manhattan, New York City, U.S.	
111	Loss	79–20–12	Sammy Fuller	PTS	10	Dec 21, 1934	Boston Garden, Boston, Massachusetts, U.S.	
110	Loss	79–19–12	Barney Ross	UD	12	Dec 10, 1934	Public Hall, Cleveland, Ohio, U.S.	For the world light welterweight title
109	Draw	79–18–12	Harry Dublinsky	PTS	10	Oct 15, 1934	Arena, Philadelphia, Pennsylvania, U.S.	
108	Win	79–18–11	Tony Falco	PTS	10	Sep 24, 1934	Arena, Philadelphia, Pennsylvania, U.S.	
107	Win	78–18–11	Eddie Ran	TKO	3 (10)	Sep 11, 1934	Olympic Auditorium, Los Angeles, California, U.S.	
106	Win	77–18–11	Michele Palermo	SD	8	Aug 14, 1934	Olympic Auditorium, Los Angeles, California, U.S.	
105	Win	76–18–11	Jimmy Slavin	TKO	3 (8)	Jul 31, 1934	Olympic Auditorium, Los Angeles, California, U.S.	
104	Loss	75–18–11	Tony Falco	UD	10	Jul 10, 1934	Olympic Auditorium, Los Angeles, California, U.S.	
103	Win	75–17–11	Angus Smith	PTS	10	May 18, 1934	Legion Stadium, Hollywood, California, U.S.	
102	Win	74–17–11	Eddie Martin	KO	1 (10)	May 2, 1934	Olympic Auditorium, Los Angeles, California, U.S.	
101	Loss	73–17–11	Barney Ross	PTS	10	Mar 27, 1934	Olympic Auditorium, Los Angeles, California, U.S.	For the world light welterweight title
100	Win	73–16–11	Lou Jallos	TKO	5 (6)	Mar 6, 1934	Olympic Auditorium, Los Angeles, California, U.S.	
99	Loss	72–16–11	Young Peter Jackson	PTS	6	Mar 2, 1934	Legion Stadium, Hollywood, California, U.S.	
98	Loss	72–15–11	Gordon Wallace	PTS	8	Feb 6, 1934	Olympic Auditorium, Los Angeles, California, U.S.	
97	Loss	72–14–11	Ceferino Garcia	KO	3 (10)	Jan 16, 1934	Olympic Auditorium, Los Angeles, California, U.S.	
96	Win	72–13–11	Eddie Ran	PTS	8	Dec 19, 1933	Olympic Auditorium, Los Angeles, California, U.S.	
95	Win	71–13–11	Kid Moro	KO	2 (10)	Dec 12, 1933	Olympic Auditorium, Los Angeles, California, U.S.	
94	Loss	70–13–11	Young Peter Jackson	PTS	10	Nov 21, 1933	Olympic Auditorium, Los Angeles, California, U.S.	
93	Loss	70–12–11	Eddie Shea	PTS	10	Sep 26, 1933	Olympic Auditorium, Los Angeles, California, U.S.	
92	Loss	70–11–11	Lew Massey	PTS	10	Sep 19, 1933	Olympic Auditorium, Los Angeles, California, U.S.	
91	Win	70–10–11	Lloyd Smith	TKO	6 (10)	Aug 25, 1933	Legion Stadium, Hollywood, California, U.S.	
90	Win	69–10–11	Sammy O'Dell	TKO	8 (10)	Aug 22, 1933	Olympic Auditorium, Los Angeles, California, U.S.	
89	Loss	68–10–11	Kenny LaSalle	PTS	10	Aug 15, 1933	Olympic Auditorium, Los Angeles, California, U.S.	
88	Win	68–9–11	Kenny LaSalle	PTS	10	Jul 26, 1933	Olympic Auditorium, Los Angeles, California, U.S.	
87	Win	67–9–11	Freddie Tooley	KO	1 (6)	Jul 15, 1933	Arena, San Diego, California, U.S.	
86	Win	66–9–11	Sol Lippo	KO	2 (6)	Jun 28, 1933	Olympic Auditorium, Los Angeles, California, U.S.	
85	Win	65–9–11	Alex Hadrian	KO	8 (10)	Jun 9, 1933	Legion Stadium, Hollywood, California, U.S.	
84	Win	64–9–11	Frankie Neil	KO	2 (6)	May 27, 1933	Arena, San Diego, California, U.S.	
83	Draw	63–9–11	Alvin Lewis	PTS	6	May 2, 1933	Olympic Auditorium, Los Angeles, California, U.S.	
82	Win	63–9–10	Doc Snell	PTS	6	Apr 11, 1933	Olympic Auditorium, Los Angeles, California, U.S.	
81	Win	62–9–10	Kid Lombardo	PTS	10	Mar 28, 1933	Olympic Auditorium, Los Angeles, California, U.S.	
80	Win	61–9–10	Jackie Pilkington	TKO	5 (10)	Feb 28, 1933	Olympic Auditorium, Los Angeles, California, U.S.	
79	Win	60–9–10	Young Corpu	KO	1 (10)	Jan 27, 1933	Legion Stadium, Hollywood, California, U.S.	
78	Loss	59–9–10	Young Peter Jackson	KO	10 (10)	Dec 27, 1932	Olympic Auditorium, Los Angeles, California, U.S.	Lost California State Athletic Commission lightweight title; For Pacific Coast lightweight title according to The Ring magazine
77	Win	59–8–10	Eddie Volk	KO	2 (10)	Dec 9, 1932	Legion Stadium, Hollywood, California, U.S.	
76	Win	58–8–10	Joey Costa	PTS	8	Nov 4, 1932	Legion Stadium, Hollywood, California, U.S.	
75	Draw	57–8–10	Frankie Klick	PTS	8	Oct 7, 1932	Legion Stadium, Hollywood, California, U.S.	
74	Win	57–8–9	Frankie Diaz	KO	2 (10)	Jul 13, 1932	Olympic Auditorium, Los Angeles, California, U.S.	
73	Draw	56–8–9	Armando Santiago	PTS	10	Mar 8, 1932	Olympic Auditorium, Los Angeles, California, U.S.	
72	Win	56–8–8	Don Burchard	KO	1 (10)	Feb 10, 1932	Olympic Auditorium, Los Angeles, California, U.S.	
71	Loss	55–8–8	Manuel Villa I	PTS	12	Jan 1, 1932	Olympic Auditorium, Los Angeles, California, U.S.	For Mexican lightweight title
70	Win	55–7–8	Tony Azevedo	PTS	10	Dec 29, 1931	Olympic Auditorium, Los Angeles, California, U.S.	
69	Win	54–7–8	Hector McDonald	TKO	6 (10)	Dec 1, 1931	Olympic Auditorium, Los Angeles, California, U.S.	Retained California State Athletic Commission lightweight title
68	Win	53–7–8	Tod Morgan	TKO	7 (10)	Nov 10, 1931	Olympic Auditorium, Los Angeles, California, U.S.	
67	Loss	52–7–8	Cecil Payne	PTS	10	Oct 23, 1931	Legion Stadium, Hollywood, California, U.S.	
66	Win	52–6–8	Warren Frakes	PTS	10	Oct 9, 1931	Legion Stadium, Hollywood, California, U.S.	
65	Win	51–6–8	Tod Morgan	PTS	10	Aug 11, 1931	Olympic Auditorium, Los Angeles, California, U.S.	Won California State Athletic Commission lightweight title
64	Win	50–6–8	Goldie Hess	PTS	10	Jul 13, 1931	Olympic Auditorium, Los Angeles, California, U.S.	
63	Win	49–6–8	Danny Solis	KO	1 (10)	Jun 5, 1931	Legion Stadium, Hollywood, California, U.S.	
62	Win	48–6–8	Goldie Hess	PTS	10	May 29, 1931	Legion Stadium, Hollywood, California, U.S.	
61	Draw	47–6–8	Goldie Hess	PTS	10	May 8, 1931	Legion Stadium, Hollywood, California, U.S.	
60	Win	47–6–7	Jackie Mandell	KO	1 (10)	Apr 24, 1931	Legion Stadium, Hollywood, California, U.S.	
59	Win	46–6–7	Frankie Boldt	TKO	2 (4)	Apr 18, 1931	Arena, San Diego, California, U.S.	
58	Win	45–6–7	Joe Saldivar	PTS	10	Mar 27, 1931	Legion Stadium, Hollywood, California, U.S.	
57	Loss	44–6–7	Frankie Klick	PTS	10	Mar 13, 1931	Legion Stadium, Hollywood, California, U.S.	
56	Win	44–5–7	Bobby Herman	KO	1 (10)	Mar 6, 1931	Legion Stadium, Hollywood, California, U.S.	
55	Win	43–5–7	Joe Galvis	PTS	10	Feb 13, 1931	Legion Stadium, Hollywood, California, U.S.	
54	Win	42–5–7	Johnny Previs	TKO	6 (6)	Feb 6, 1931	Legion Stadium, Hollywood, California, U.S.	
53	Win	41–5–7	Ignacio Fernandez	PTS	10	Jan 23, 1931	Legion Stadium, Hollywood, California, U.S.	
52	Win	40–5–7	Dios Dado	KO	1 (10)	Jan 9, 1931	Legion Stadium, Hollywood, California, U.S.	
51	Win	39–5–7	Hymie Rudin	KO	2 (6)	Dec 20, 1930	Arena, San Diego, California, U.S.	
50	Win	38–5–7	Trip Limbaco	KO	2 (10)	Dec 12, 1930	Legion Stadium, Hollywood, California, U.S.	
49	Win	37–5–7	Bobbie Ramirez	KO	1 (10)	Dec 5, 1930	Legion Stadium, Hollywood, California, U.S.	
48	Draw	36–5–7	Benny Pelz	PTS	6	Nov 18, 1930	Olympic Auditorium, Los Angeles, California, U.S.	
47	Win	36–5–6	Jimmy Black	KO	3 (10)	Oct 31, 1930	Legion Stadium, Hollywood, California, U.S.	
46	Win	35–5–6	Charles Ernst	TKO	3 (6)	Oct 21, 1930	Olympic Auditorium, Los Angeles, California, U.S.	
45	Win	34–5–6	Wendell Long	KO	3 (10)	Oct 10, 1930	Legion Stadium, Hollywood, California, U.S.	
44	Draw	33–5–6	Rita Punay	PTS	6	Sep 30, 1930	Olympic Auditorium, Los Angeles, California, U.S.	
43	Win	33–5–5	Jimmy Black	PTS	6	Sep 16, 1930	Olympic Auditorium, Los Angeles, California, U.S.	
42	Loss	32–5–5	Jackie Mandell	DQ	2 (6)	Sep 9, 1930	Olympic Auditorium, Los Angeles, California, U.S.	
41	Draw	32–4–5	Jimmy Black	PTS	10	Aug 22, 1930	Legion Stadium, Hollywood, California, U.S.	
40	Loss	32–4–4	Johnny Delano	PTS	6	Aug 5, 1930	Olympic Auditorium, Los Angeles, California, U.S.	
39	Win	32–3–4	Battling Siki	PTS	10	Jul 18, 1930	Legion Stadium, Hollywood, California, U.S.	
38	Win	31–3–4	Huerta Evans	PTS	6	Jul 8, 1930	Olympic Auditorium, Los Angeles, California, U.S.	
37	Win	30–3–4	Johnny Torres	TKO	8 (10)	Jun 13, 1930	Legion Stadium, Hollywood, California, U.S.	
36	Loss	29–3–4	Santiago Zorrilla	PTS	10	May 23, 1930	Legion Stadium, Hollywood, California, U.S.	
35	Win	29–2–4	Santiago Zorrilla	PTS	10	Apr 25, 1930	Legion Stadium, Hollywood, California, U.S.	
34	Win	28–2–4	Angel Payo	KO	2 (10)	Apr 11, 1930	Legion Stadium, Hollywood, California, U.S.	
33	Draw	27–2–4	Wendell Red Humphries	PTS	6	Mar 4, 1930	Olympic Auditorium, Los Angeles, California, U.S.	
32	Win	27–2–3	Kid Avelino	PTS	10	Feb 28, 1930	Legion Stadium, Hollywood, California, U.S.	
31	Win	26–2–3	Johnny Villaflores	KO	1 (10)	Feb 14, 1930	Legion Stadium, Hollywood, California, U.S.	
30	Win	25–2–3	Battling Bulahan	KO	4 (10)	Jan 17, 1930	Legion Stadium, Hollywood, California, U.S.	
29	Win	24–2–3	Louie Balazo	KO	1 (10)	Jan 3, 1930	Legion Stadium, Hollywood, California, U.S.	
28	Win	23–2–3	Bobby Mars	KO	2 (10)	Dec 20, 1929	Legion Stadium, Hollywood, California, U.S.	
27	Win	22–2–3	Speedy Sparks	KO	1 (10)	Dec 6, 1929	Legion Stadium, Hollywood, California, U.S.	
26	Win	21–2–3	Benny Furrell	KO	1 (10)	Nov 22, 1929	Legion Stadium, Hollywood, California, U.S.	
25	Win	20–2–3	Johnny Villaflores	PTS	10	Nov 8, 1929	Legion Stadium, Hollywood, California, U.S.	
24	Win	19–2–3	Billy Harms	PTS	10	Oct 25, 1929	Legion Stadium, Hollywood, California, U.S.	
23	Win	18–2–3	Johnny Villaflores	PTS	10	Oct 11, 1929	Legion Stadium, Hollywood, California, U.S.	
22	Win	17–2–3	Mike Cordova	KO	2 (10)	Sep 27, 1929	Legion Stadium, Hollywood, California, U.S.	
21	Win	16–2–3	Jimmy Black	PTS	10	Sep 13, 1929	Legion Stadium, Hollywood, California, U.S.	
20	Win	15–2–3	Frankie Grandetta	PTS	10	Aug 30, 1929	Legion Stadium, Hollywood, California, U.S.	
19	Win	14–2–3	Kid Ponce	PTS	10	Aug 16, 1929	Legion Stadium, Hollywood, California, U.S.	
18	Win	13–2–3	Kid Avelino	PTS	10	Aug 2, 1929	Legion Stadium, Hollywood, California, U.S.	
17	Win	12–2–3	Johnny Torres	PTS	10	Jul 19, 1929	Legion Stadium, Hollywood, California, U.S.	
16	Win	11–2–3	Johnny Villaflores	PTS	10	Jul 5, 1929	Legion Stadium, Hollywood, California, U.S.	
15	Win	10–2–3	Mike Cordova	PTS	10	Jun 21, 1929	Legion Stadium, Hollywood, California, U.S.	
14	Win	9–2–3	Speedy Sparks	PTS	10	Jun 7, 1929	Legion Stadium, Hollywood, California, U.S.	
13	Win	8–2–3	Battling Bulahan	PTS	10	May 24, 1929	Legion Stadium, Hollywood, California, U.S.	
12	Loss	7–2–3	Young Bello	PTS	10	May 10, 1929	Legion Stadium, Hollywood, California, U.S.	
11	Win	7–1–3	Johnny Villaflores	PTS	10	Apr 26, 1929	Legion Stadium, Hollywood, California, U.S.	
10	Win	6–1–3	Kid Avelino	PTS	10	Apr 12, 1929	Legion Stadium, Hollywood, California, U.S.	
9	Win	5–1–3	Johnny Torres	PTS	10	Mar 29, 1929	Legion Stadium, Hollywood, California, U.S.	
8	Draw	4–1–3	Young Brooks	PTS	10	Mar 15, 1929	Legion Stadium, Hollywood, California, U.S.	
7	Win	4–1–2	Johnny Villaflores	PTS	10	Mar 1, 1929	Legion Stadium, Hollywood, California, U.S.	
6	Loss	3–1–2	Young Bello	PTS	10	Feb 15, 1929	Legion Stadium, Hollywood, California, U.S.	
5	Win	3–0–2	Johnny Torres	PTS	10	Feb 1, 1929	Legion Stadium, Hollywood, California, U.S.	
4	Win	2–0–2	Kid Avelino	PTS	10	Jan 18, 1929	Legion Stadium, Hollywood, California, U.S.	
3	Win	1–0–2	Mike Cordova	PTS	10	Dec 21, 1928	Legion Stadium, Hollywood, California, U.S.	
2	Draw	0–0–2	Young Brooks	PTS	10	Oct 12, 1928	Olympic Auditorium, Los Angeles, California, U.S.	
1	Draw	0–0–1	Young Brooks	PTS	10	Sep 14, 1928	Olympic Auditorium, Los Angeles, California, U.S.	

== See also ==
- List of male boxers
