= Tony Canzoneri =

American boxer (1908–1959)

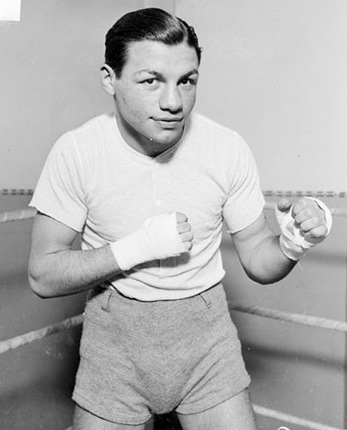
- Canzoneri in 1929

Personal information
- Born: November 6, 1908 Slidell, Louisiana, U.S.
- Died: December 9, 1959 (aged 51) Manhattan, New York, U.S.
- Height: 5 ft 4 in (163 cm)

Boxing career
- Weight class: Bantamweight; Featherweight; Lightweight; Light Welterweight
- Reach: 65 in (165 cm)
- Stance: Orthodox

Boxing record
- Total fights: 175
- Wins: 141
- Win by KO: 44
- Losses: 24
- Draws: 10

Tony Canzoneri (November 6, 1908 – December 9, 1959) was an American professional boxer. A three-division world champion, he held a total of five world titles. Canzoneri is a member of the exclusive group of boxing world champions who have won titles in three or more divisions. Canzoneri fought for championships between bantamweight and light welterweight. Historian Bert Sugar ranked Canzoneri as the 12th-greatest fighter of all time.

Canzoneri was inducted into The Ring magazine Hall of Fame in 1956, the World Boxing Hall of Fame in 1981, and the International Boxing Hall of Fame as a member of its inaugural class in 1990. As of November 2022, BoxRec ranked Canzoneri as the 11th-greatest pound for pound boxer of all time.

== Early life ==
Canzoneri was born in Slidell, Louisiana. By the time he was 11 in 1920, the family had moved to Johnston City, Illinois. In 1925, when he was 18, he lived in the Bedford–Stuyvesant area of Brooklyn (his occupation in the 1925 New York census is listed as "prize fighter"). The 1930 U.S. census shows the family in Marlboro, New York. In 1940 he was living on the Upper West Side, and the census indicates he had lived there since at least 1935. Although Staten Island claims him, no records seem to exist of his residence there. Staten Island, New York, although he may have campaigned most of his career there.

Canzoneri weighed only about 85 pounds when he first took up boxing and began competing as an amateur. He fit the mould of the typical American boxer of the era: He could box up to three or four times in one month and up to 24 or 25 times in one year, and he would seldom fight outside New York City, considered to be boxing's mecca at the time. Of his first 38 professional bouts, only one was fought west of New York City, and was in New Jersey. His first professional fight and win was against Jack Gardner on July 27, 1925. Canzoneri claimed he got the first knockout scored in the new Madison Square Garden in a bout against Danny Terris on December 23 of the same year.

== Professional career ==
=== Two-division world champion ===
Canzoneri won his first title, the World Featherweight title, with a 15-round decision over Benny Bass on February 10, 1928. He defended the title once and then went up in weight and challenged World Lightweight Champion Sammy Mandell, losing by a decision in ten rounds. In 1930, Mandell was knocked out in the first round by Al Singer and lost his title and Canzoneri, who had already beaten Singer by a ten-round decision before, challenged Singer for the title on November 14, 1930, knocking him out in the first round to become a two division world champion. In defeat, Singer made history by becoming the first man, and only man up until John Mugabi, to both win and lose the title by knockout in the first round.

=== Three-division world champion ===
Canzoneri's first defense was a unification of sorts: He faced World Light Welterweight champion Jack Kid Berg, who was putting his title on the line and trying to take Canzoneri's lightweight crown. Canzoneri became a three-division world champion by knocking Berg out in the third round on April 24, 1931. Canzoneri, Barney Ross and Henry Armstrong were the only boxing champions in history allowed to hold two or more world titles simultaneously. (Sugar Ray Leonard became both the vacant World Super Middleweight and the World Light Heavyweight Champion in one night in 1988, but he could keep only one and chose to keep the Super Middleweight title.)

=== Regaining the light welterweight title ===
Canzoneri lost his world Light Welterweight Championship to Johnny Jadick and he lost to Jadick again in a rematch. Meanwhile, Canzoneri kept retaining his lightweight belt, defending it against the likes of Billy Petrolle and his brother Frankie Petrolle.

Jadick lost his belt to Battling Shaw and Canzoneri once again challenged for the World Light Welterweight title while keeping his Lightweight title. He beat Shaw by decision and recovered the world Light Welterweight Championship. In his next bout, versus Ross, he lost both belts when Ross beat him by a ten-round decision. There was an immediate rematch and Ross won again, this time by decision in 15.

=== Regaining the lightweight title ===
On May 10, 1935, Canzoneri faced Lou Ambers for the world lightweight title, outpointing him over 15 rounds to regain the championship and become the first lightweight in history to recapture the title. After successfully defending his Lightweight title once, he lost it again in a rematch with Ambers by a 15-round decision. There was a rubber match between the two and Ambers once again won a decision in 15 rounds.

=== Later career ===
Canzoneri went on boxing professionally until 1939, but he never again challenged for a world title. Among other world champions that he beat were Frankie Klick, Baby Arizmendi, Jimmy McLarnin and Kid Chocolate.

Canzoneri had a record of 137 wins, 24 losses, 10 draws and 3 no decisions (Newspaper Decisions: 4–0–0). During his era, many states and countries still had no scoring on boxing fights, so each time a fight would go the scheduled number of rounds without a knockout, no decision would be made as to the winner. Newspapers, however, would fill this gap, giving their own opinion of which boxer had won the fight. He had 44 knockouts, and only one loss by knockout. Canzoneri was managed by Sammy Goldman.

He died of a heart attack in Manhattan at the age of 51. He is a member of the International Boxing Hall of Fame.

== Professional boxing record ==
All information in this section is derived from BoxRec, unless otherwise stated.

=== Official record ===
175 fights	137 wins	24 losses
By knockout	44	1
By decision	93	22
By disqualification	0	1
Draws	10	
Newspaper decisions/draws	4	

All newspaper decisions are officially regarded as “no decision” bouts and are not counted in the win/loss/draw column.

No.	Result	Record	Opponent	Type	Round	Date	Location	Notes
175	Loss	137–24–10 (4)	Al Bummy Davis	TKO	3 (10)	Nov 1, 1939	Madison Square Garden, New York City, New York, U.S.	
174	Win	137–23–10 (4)	Eddie Brink	PTS	8	Sep 19, 1939	Broadway Arena, New York City, New York, U.S.	
173	Win	136–23–10 (4)	Gerald D'Elia	PTS	8	Aug 26, 1939	Thompson's Stadium, New York City, New York, U.S.	
172	Win	135–23–10 (4)	Frankie Wallace	PTS	8	Aug 18, 1939	Long Beach Stadium, Long Beach, New Jersey, U.S.	
171	Win	134–23–10 (4)	Joe De Jesus	PTS	8	Aug 3, 1939	Fort Hamilton Arena, New York City, New York, U.S.	
170	Win	133–23–10 (4)	Ambrose Logan	PTS	8	Jul 17, 1939	Coney Island Velodrome, New York City, New York, U.S.	
169	Win	132–23–10 (4)	Joe De Jesus	PTS	8	Jul 6, 1939	Woodcliff Park, Poughkeepsie, New York, U.S.	
168	Loss	131–23–10 (4)	Harris Blake	PTS	10	Jun 5, 1939	Broadway Auditorium, Buffalo, New York, U.S.	
167	Draw	131–22–10 (4)	Nick Camarata	SD	10	May 15, 1939	Municipal Auditorium, New Orleans, Louisiana, U.S.	
166	Loss	131–22–9 (4)	Jimmy Tygh	SD	10	May 1, 1939	Arena, Philadelphia, Pennsylvania, U.S.	
165	Draw	131–21–9 (4)	Jimmy Vaughn	PTS	10	Apr 11, 1939	New York Coliseum, New York City, New York, U.S.	
164	Loss	131–21–8 (4)	Eddie Brink	SD	10	Mar 28, 1939	Hippodrome, New York City, New York, U.S.	
163	Win	131–20–8 (4)	Eddie Brink	PTS	8	Mar 7, 1939	New York Coliseum, New York City, New York, U.S.	
162	Win	130–20–8 (4)	Bobby Pacho	PTS	10	Feb 7, 1939	Olympic Auditorium, Los Angeles, California, U.S.	
161	Win	129–20–8 (4)	Everett Simington	TKO	3 (10)	Jan 31, 1939	Civic Auditorium, San Jose, California, U.S.	
160	Win	128–20–8 (4)	Joe Govras	TKO	2 (10)	Jan 27, 1939	Dreamland Auditorium, San Francisco, California, U.S.	
159	Win	127–20–8 (4)	Wally Hally	UD	10	Jan 19, 1939	City Auditorium, Denver, Colorado, U.S.	
158	Win	126–20–8 (4)	Eddie Zivic	PTS	10	Dec 30, 1938	Hippodrome, New York City, New York, U.S.	
157	Win	125–20–8 (4)	Jimmy Murray	PTS	8	Dec 1, 1938	Ridgewood Grove, New York City, New York, U.S.	
156	Win	124–20–8 (4)	Howard Scott	MD	8	Nov 22, 1938	New York Coliseum, New York City, New York, U.S.	
155	Win	124–20–8 (4)	Al Dunbard	KO	3 (10)	Nov 1, 1938	Convention Hall, Camden, New Jersey, U.S.	
154	Win	123–20–8 (4)	Howard Scott	PTS	8	Oct 26, 1938	Braddock Arena, Jersey City, New Jersey, U.S.	
153	Loss	122–20–8 (4)	Eddie Zivic	MD	10	Oct 17, 1938	Town Hall, Scranton, Pennsylvania, U.S.	
152	Loss	122–19–8 (4)	Lou Ambers	UD	15	May 7, 1937	Madison Square Garden, New York City, New York, U.S.	For NYSAC, NBA, and The Ring lightweight titles
151	Win	121–18–8 (4)	Joey Zodda	KO	7 (10)	Apr 24, 1937	Ridgewood Grove, New York City, New York, U.S.	
150	Win	120–18–8 (4)	Frankie Wallace	PTS	8	Apr 13, 1937	Broadway Arena, New York City, New York, U.S.	
149	Win	119–18–8 (4)	George Levy	TKO	7 (10)	Apr 5, 1937	Madison Square Garden, New York City, New York, U.S.	
148	Loss	118–18–8 (4)	Jimmy McLarnin	UD	10	Oct 5, 1936	Madison Square Garden, New York City, New York, U.S.	
147	Loss	118–17–8 (4)	Lou Ambers	UD	15	Sep 3, 1936	Madison Square Garden, New York City, New York, U.S.	Lost NYSAC, NBA, and The Ring lightweight titles
146	Win	118–16–8 (4)	Jimmy McLarnin	UD	10	May 8, 1936	Madison Square Garden, New York City, New York, U.S.	
145	Win	117–16–8 (4)	Johnny Jadick	PTS	10	Apr 9, 1936	St. Nicholas Arena, New York City, New York, U.S.	
144	Win	116–16–8 (4)	Steve Halaiko	KO	2 (8)	Mar 2, 1936	St. Nicholas Arena, New York City, New York, U.S.	
143	Win	115–16–8 (4)	Billy Hogan	KO	4 (10)	Feb 15, 1936	Ridgewood Grove, New York City, New York, U.S.	
142	Win	114–16–8 (4)	Tootsie Bashara	TKO	3 (10)	Jan 30, 1936	Olympia A.C., Philadelphia, Pennsylvania, U.S.	
141	Win	113–16–8 (4)	Midget Mexico	TKO	9 (10)	Jan 22, 1936	Star Casino, New York City, New York, U.S.	
140	Win	112–16–8 (4)	Al Roth	UD	15	Oct 4, 1935	Madison Square Garden, New York City, New York, U.S.	Retained NYSAC, NBA, and The Ring lightweight titles
139	Win	111–16–8 (4)	Joe Ghnouly	UD	10	Sep 13, 1935	Arena, Saint Louis, Missouri, U.S.	
138	Win	110–16–8 (4)	Frankie Klick	PTS	10	Aug 19, 1935	Civic Auditorium, San Francisco, California, U.S.	
137	Win	109–16–8 (4)	Bobby Pacho	PTS	10	Jul 25, 1935	Mills Stadium, Chicago, Illinois, U.S.	
136	Win	108–16–8 (4)	Frankie Klick	SD	12	Jun 10, 1935	Griffith Stadium, Washington, District of Columbia, U.S.	
135	Win	107–16–8 (4)	Lou Ambers	UD	15	May 10, 1935	Madison Square Garden, New York City, New York, U.S.	Won vacant NYSAC, NBA, and The Ring lightweight titles
134	Win	106–16–8 (4)	Eddie Zivic	TKO	7 (10)	Apr 25, 1935	Motor Square Garden, Pittsburgh, Pennsylvania, U.S.	
133	Win	105–16–8 (4)	Chuck Woods	UD	10	Mar 15, 1935	Chicago Stadium, Chicago, Illinois, U.S.	
132	Loss	104–16–8 (4)	Chuck Woods	PTS	10	Feb 26, 1935	Chicago Stadium, Chicago, Illinois, U.S.	
131	Win	104–15–8 (4)	Leo Rodak	UD	10	Jan 31, 1935	Chicago Stadium, Chicago, Illinois, U.S.	
130	Win	103–15–8 (4)	Honeyboy Hughes	PTS	10	Jan 21, 1935	Convention Hall, Utica, New York, U.S.	
129	Win	102–15–8 (4)	Eddie Ran	KO	2 (10)	Jan 7, 1935	Laurel Garden, Newark, New Jersey, U.S.	
128	Win	101–15–8 (4)	Harry Dublinsky	PTS	10	Sep 26, 1934	Ebbets Field, New York City, New York, U.S.	
127	Loss	100–15–8 (4)	Harry Dublinsky	PTS	10	Aug 29, 1934	Ebbets Field, New York City, New York, U.S.	
126	Win	100–14–8 (4)	Frankie Klick	TKO	9 (10)	Jun 28, 1934	Ebbets Field, New York City, New York, U.S.	
125	Win	99–14–8 (4)	Baby Arizmendi	PTS	10	Mar 13, 1934	Olympic Auditorium, Los Angeles, California, U.S.	
124	Win	98–14–8 (4)	Pete Nebo	PTS	12	Mar 1, 1934	Convention Hall, Kansas City, Missouri, U.S.	
123	Win	97–14–8 (4)	Cleto Locatelli	MD	12	Feb 2, 1934	Madison Square Garden, New York City, New York, U.S.	
122	Win	96–14–8 (4)	Cleto Locatelli	UD	10	Dec 15, 1933	Madison Square Garden, New York City, New York, U.S.	
121	Win	95–14–8 (4)	Cecil Payne	KO	5 (10)	Dec 4, 1933	Public Hall, Cleveland, Ohio, U.S.	
120	Win	94–14–8 (4)	Kid Chocolate	KO	2 (10)	Nov 24, 1933	Madison Square Garden, New York City, New York, U.S.	
119	Win	93–14–8 (4)	Frankie Klick	UD	10	Oct 28, 1933	Ridgewood Grove, New York City, New York, U.S.	
118	Loss	92–14–8 (4)	Barney Ross	SD	15	Sep 12, 1933	Polo Grounds, New York City, New York, U.S.	For NYSAC, NBA, and The Ring lightweight titles; For world light-welterweight title
117	Loss	92–13–8 (4)	Barney Ross	MD	10	Jun 23, 1933	Chicago Stadium, Chicago, Illinois, U.S.	Lost NYSAC, NBA, and The Ring lightweight titles; Lost world light-welterweight title
116	Win	92–12–8 (4)	Battling Shaw	UD	10	May 21, 1933	Heinemann Park, New Orleans, Louisiana, U.S.	Won World light-welterweight title
115	Loss	91–12–8 (4)	Wesley Ramey	PTS	10	Apr 20, 1933	Civic Auditorium, Grand Rapids, Michigan, U.S.	
114	Win	91–11–8 (4)	Pete Nebo	PTS	10	Feb 23, 1933	Madison Square Garden Stadium, Miami, Florida, U.S.	
113	Win	90–11–8 (4)	Billy Townsend	KO	1 (10)	Feb 3, 1933	Madison Square Garden, New York City, New York, U.S.	
112	Win	89–11–8 (4)	Billy Petrolle	UD	15	Nov 4, 1932	Madison Square Garden, New York City, New York, U.S.	Retained NYSAC, NBA, and The Ring lightweight titles
111	Win	88–11–8 (4)	Frankie Petrolle	KO	3 (10)	Oct 12, 1932	Ebbets Field, New York City, New York, U.S.	
110	Win	87–11–8 (4)	Lew Kirsch	TKO	3 (10)	Sep 29, 1932	Queensboro Stadium, New York City, New York, U.S.	
109	Loss	86–11–8 (4)	Johnny Jadick	SD	10	Jul 18, 1932	Baker Bowl, Philadelphia, Pennsylvania, U.S.	For NBA light-welterweight title
108	Win	86–10–8 (4)	Harry Dublinsky	SD	10	Jun 16, 1932	Sparta Stadium, Chicago, Illinois, U.S.	
107	Win	85–10–8 (4)	Battling Gizzy	PTS	5 (10)	May 23, 1932	Meyers Bowl, North Braddock, New Jersey, U.S.	
106	Win	84–10–8 (4)	Ray Kiser	UD	10	Apr 4, 1932	Coliseum Arena, New Orleans, Louisiana, U.S.	
105	Win	83–10–8 (4)	Lew Massey	UD	10	Feb 15, 1932	Arena, Philadelphia, Pennsylvania, U.S.	
104	Loss	82–10–8 (4)	Johnny Jadick	UD	10	Jan 18, 1932	Arena, Philadelphia, Pennsylvania, U.S.	Lost NBA light-welterweight title
103	Win	82–9–8 (4)	Kid Chocolate	SD	15	Nov 20, 1931	Polo Grounds, New York City, New York, U.S.	Retained NYSAC, NBA, and The Ring lightweight titles
102	Win	81–9–8 (4)	Philly Griffin	UD	10	Oct 29, 1931	Polo Grounds, New York City, New York, U.S.	Retained NBA light-welterweight title
101	Win	80–9–8 (4)	Jack Kid Berg	UD	15	Sep 10, 1931	Polo Grounds, New York City, New York, U.S.	Retained NYSAC, NBA, and The Ring lightweight titles; For NBA light-welterweight title
100	Win	79–9–8 (4)	Cecil Payne	PTS	10	Jul 13, 1931	Wrigley Field, Los Angeles, California, U.S.	Retained NBA light-welterweight title
99	Win	78–9–8 (4)	Herman Perlick	PTS	10	Jun 25, 1931	White City Stadium, West Haven, Connecticut, USA	
98	Win	77–9–8 (4)	Jack Kid Berg	KO	3 (10)	Apr 24, 1931	Chicago Stadium, Chicago, Illinois, U.S.	Retained NYSAC, NBA, and The Ring lightweight titles; Won NBA light-welterweight title
97	Win	76–9–8 (4)	Tommy Grogan	PTS	10	Mar 23, 1931	Arena, Philadelphia, Pennsylvania, U.S.	
96	Loss	75–9–8 (4)	Sammy Fuller	UD	10	Mar 6, 1931	Boston Garden, Boston, Illinois, U.S.	
95	Win	75–8–8 (4)	Joey Kaufman	TKO	1 (10)	Feb 25, 1931	Hollywood Arena, Jersey City, New Jersey, U.S.	
94	Win	74–8–8 (4)	Johnny Farr	NWS	10	Jan 26, 1931	Coliseum Arena, New Orleans, Louisiana, U.S.	
93	Win	74–8–8 (3)	Al Singer	KO	1 (15)	Nov 14, 1930	Madison Square Garden, New York City, New York, U.S.	Won NYSAC, NBA, and The Ring lightweight titles
92	Loss	73–8–8 (3)	Billy Petrolle	PTS	10	Sep 11, 1930	Chicago Stadium, Chicago, Illinois, U.S.	
91	Win	73–7–8 (3)	Goldie Hess	PTS	10	Aug 28, 1930	Queensboro Stadium, New York City, New York, U.S.	
90	Win	72–7–8 (3)	Benny Bass	UD	10	Jul 21, 1930	Shibe Park, Philadelphia, Pennsylvania, U.S.	
89	Win	71–7–8 (3)	Tommy Grogan	PTS	10	Jun 24, 1930	Queensboro Stadium, New York City, New York, U.S.	
88	Win	70–7–8 (3)	Joe Glick	PTS	10	Jun 4, 1930	Ebbets Field, New York City, New York, U.S.	
87	Win	69–7–8 (3)	Johnny Farr	PTS	10	May 14, 1930	Arena, New Haven, Connecticut, U.S.	
86	Win	68–7–8 (3)	Harry Carlton	UD	10	May 5, 1930	St. Nicholas Arena, New York City, New York, U.S.	
85	Win	67–7–8 (3)	Frankie LaFay	TKO	1 (10)	Apr 8, 1930	Broadway Arena, New York City, New York, U.S.	
84	Win	66–7–8 (3)	Steve Smith	TKO	7 (10)	Apr 1, 1930	Arena, New Haven, Connecticut, U.S.	
83	Win	65–7–8 (3)	Stanislaus Loayza	UD	10	Mar 14, 1930	Madison Square Garden, New York City, New York, U.S.	
82	Win	64–7–8 (3)	Solly Ritz	TKO	1 (10)	Mar 4, 1930	Broadway Arena, New York City, New York, U.S.	
81	Loss	63–7–8 (3)	Jack Kid Berg	SD	10	Jan 17, 1930	Madison Square Garden, New York City, New York, U.S.	
80	Win	63–6–8 (3)	Stanislaus Loayza	UD	10	Oct 30, 1929	Coliseum, Chicago, Illinois, U.S.	
79	Win	62–6–8 (3)	Johnny Farr	PTS	10	Oct 18, 1929	Madison Square Garden, New York City, New York, U.S.	
78	Win	61–6–8 (3)	Eddie Mack	TKO	8 (10)	Sep 27, 1929	Chicago Stadium, Chicago, Illinois, U.S.	
77	Win	60–6–8 (3)	Eddie Wolfe	PTS	10	Sep 20, 1929	Heinemann Park, New Orleans, Louisiana, U.S.	
76	Loss	59–6–8 (3)	Sammy Mandell	SD	10	Aug 2, 1929	Chicago Stadium, Chicago, Illinois, U.S.	For NYSAC, NBA, and The Ring lightweight titles
75	Win	59–5–8 (3)	Phil McGraw	PTS	10	Jul 9, 1929	Queensboro Stadium, New York City, New York, U.S.	
74	Win	58–5–8 (3)	Ignacio Fernandez	PTS	10	Jun 4, 1929	Queensboro Stadium, New York City, New York, U.S.	
73	Win	57–5–8 (3)	André Routis	UD	10	May 10, 1929	Chicago Stadium, Chicago, Illinois, U.S.	
72	Win	56–5–8 (3)	Sammy Dorfman	PTS	10	Apr 26, 1929	Madison Square Garden, New York City, New York, U.S.	
71	Win	55–5–8 (3)	Cowboy Eddie Anderson	NWS	10	Apr 9, 1929	Auditorium, Milwaukee, Wisconsin, U.S.	
70	Win	55–5–8 (2)	Cecil Payne	PTS	10	Mar 8, 1929	Olympia Stadium, Detroit, Michigan, U.S.	
69	Win	54–5–8 (2)	Ignacio Fernandez	UD	10	Feb 26, 1929	Coliseum, Chicago, Illinois, U.S.	
68	Win	53–5–8 (2)	Joey Sangor	TKO	7 (10)	Feb 6, 1929	Coliseum, Chicago, Illinois, U.S.	
67	Win	52–5–8 (2)	Armando Santiago	KO	5 (10)	Jan 18, 1929	Coliseum, Chicago, Illinois, U.S.	
66	Draw	51–5–8 (2)	Al Singer	MD	10	Dec 14, 1929	Coliseum, Chicago, Illinois, U.S.	
65	Win	51–5–7 (2)	Chick Suggs	KO	6 (10)	Dec 8, 1928	Olympia Boxing Club, New York City, New York, U.S.	
64	Win	50–5–7 (2)	Gaston Charles	PTS	10	Oct 29, 1928	Broadway Arena, New York City, New York, U.S.	
63	Loss	49–5–7 (2)	André Routis	SD	15	Sep 28, 1928	Madison Square Garden, New York City, New York, U.S.	Lost NYSAC, NBA, and The Ring featherweight titles
62	Win	49–4–7 (2)	Bobby Garcia	KO	1 (10)	Aug 28, 1928	Velodrome, Newark, New Jersey, U.S.	
61	Loss	48–4–7 (2)	Harry Blitman	PTS	10	Jun 27, 1928	Baker Bowl, Philadelphia, Pennsylvania, U.S.	
60	Win	48–3–7 (2)	Vic Foley	PTS	10	Jun 13, 1928	Baseball Stadium, Montreal, Quebec, Canada	
59	Win	47–3–7 (2)	Claude Wilson	TKO	1 (10)	May 28, 1928	Coliseum Arena, New Orleans, Louisiana, U.S.	
58	Win	46–3–7 (2)	Pete Passifiume	PTS	4	Feb 23, 1928	Broadway Arena, New York City, New York, U.S.	
57	Win	45–3–7 (2)	Benny Bass	SD	15	Feb 10, 1928	Madison Square Garden, New York City, New York, U.S.	Retained NYSAC and The Ring featherweight titles; Won NBA featherweight title
56	Draw	44–3–7 (2)	Pete Nebo	SD	10	Jan 30, 1928	Arena, Philadelphia, Pennsylvania, U.S.	
55	Win	44–3–6 (2)	Bud Taylor	UD	10	Dec 30, 1927	Madison Square Garden, New York City, New York, U.S.	
54	Win	43–3–6 (2)	Ignacio Fernandez	UD	10	Dec 1, 1927	Madison Square Garden, New York City, New York, U.S.	
53	Win	42–3–6 (2)	Vicent DiLeo	TKO	1 (4)	Nov 22, 1927	Olympia Boxing Club, New York City, New York, U.S.	
52	Win	41–3–6 (2)	Billy Henry	KO	2 (10)	Nov 7, 1927	Arena, Philadelphia, Pennsylvania, U.S.	
51	Win	40–3–6 (2)	Johnny Dundee	UD	15	Oct 24, 1927	Madison Square Garden, New York City, New York, U.S.	Won vacant NYSAC and The Ring featherweight titles
50	Win	39–3–6 (2)	Tommy Ryan	PTS	10	Oct 3, 1927	Broadway Arena, New York City, New York, U.S.	
49	Loss	38–3–6 (2)	Cowboy Eddie Anderson	DQ	3 (10)	Sep 2, 1927	Mills Stadium, Chicago, Illinois, U.S.	
48	Win	38–2–6 (2)	Joe Rivers	NWS	10	Aug 25, 1927	Kansas City, Kansas, U.S.	
47	Win	38–2–6 (1)	Pete Sarmiento	KO	1 (10)	Aug 17, 1927	Ebbets Field, New York City, New York, U.S.	
46	Win	37–2–6 (1)	Cowboy Eddie Anderson	PTS	10	Aug 9, 1927	Queensboro Stadium, New York City, New York, U.S.	
45	Win	36–2–6 (1)	California Joe Lynch	PTS	10	Jul 27, 1927	Olympic Arena, New York City, New York, U.S.	
44	Loss	35–2–6 (1)	Bud Taylor	UD	10	Jun 24, 1927	Wrigley Field, Chicago, Illinois, U.S.	For NBA bantamweight title
43	Win	35–1–6 (1)	Ray Rychell	TKO	7 (10)	May 3, 1927	Coliseum, Chicago, Illinois, U.S.	
42	Win	34–1–6 (1)	Harold Smith	TKO	3 (10)	Apr 24, 1927	Broadway Arena, New York City, New York, U.S.	
41	Draw	33–1–6 (1)	Vic Burrone	PTS	10	Apr 18, 1927	St. Nicholas Arena, New York City, New York, U.S.	
40	Draw	33–1–5 (1)	Bud Taylor	PTS	10	Mar 26, 1927	Coliseum, Chicago, Illinois, U.S.	For vacant NBA bantamweight title
39	Win	33–1–4 (1)	California Joe Lynch	PTS	10	Mar 7, 1927	Broadway Arena, New York City, New York, U.S.	
38	Win	32–1–4 (1)	Johnny Green	PTS	8	Feb 4, 1927	Madison Square Garden, New York City, New York, U.S.	
37	Win	31–1–4 (1)	Vic Burrone	PTS	10	Jan 22, 1927	Manhattan Casino, New York City, New York, U.S.	
36	Draw	30–1–4 (1)	Joe Ryder	PTS	10	Jan 12, 1927	Manhattan Casino, New York City, New York, U.S.	
35	Win	30–1–3 (1)	Bushy Graham	PTS	10	Dec 17, 1926	Madison Square Garden, New York City, New York, U.S.	
34	Win	29–1–3 (1)	André Routis	PTS	12	Nov 22, 1926	Broadway Arena, New York City, New York, U.S.	
33	Win	28–1–3 (1)	Enrique Savaardo	TKO	5 (10)	Nov 13, 1926	Walker A.C., New York City, New York, U.S.	
32	Loss	27–1–3 (1)	Davey Abad	PTS	10	Nov 6, 1926	Ridgewood Grove, New York City, New York, U.S.	
31	Win	27–0–3 (1)	Benny Hall	PTS	6	Oct 5, 1926	Pioneer Sporting Club, New York City, New York, U.S.	
30	Win	26–0–3 (1)	George Marks	PTS	6	Sep 20, 1926	Dexter Park Arena, Woodhaven, New York City, New York, U.S.	
29	Draw	25–0–3 (1)	Georgie Mack	PTS	6	Aug 28, 1926	Queensboro Stadium, New York City, New York, U.S.	
28	Win	25–0–2 (1)	Buck Josephs	PTS	6	Aug 14, 1926	Ridgewood Grove, New York City, New York, U.S.	
27	Win	24–0–2 (1)	Young Montreal	PTS	6	Aug 9, 1926	Dexter Park Arena, Woodhaven, New York City, New York, U.S.	
26	Win	23–0–2 (1)	Manny Wexler	KO	5 (6)	Jul 26, 1926	Dexter Park Arena, Woodhaven, New York City, New York, U.S.	
25	Win	22–0–2 (1)	Archie Bell	TKO	5 (6)	Jun 25, 1926	Coney Island Stadium, New York City, New York, U.S.	
24	Win	21–0–2 (1)	Willie Suess	PTS	6	Jun 21, 1926	Dexter Park Arena, Woodhaven, New York City, New York, U.S.	
23	Win	20–0–2 (1)	Sonny Smith	PTS	6	Jun 16, 1926	Golden City Arena, New York City, New York, U.S.	
22	Win	19–0–2 (1)	Sammy Nable	TKO	5 (6)	May 28, 1926	Coney Island Stadium, New York City, New York, U.S.	
21	Draw	18–0–2 (1)	Benny Hall	PTS	6	May 8, 1926	Ridgewood Grove, New York City, New York, U.S.	
20	Draw	18–0–1 (1)	Mike Esposito	PTS	4	Mar 25, 1926	Madison Square Garden, New York City, New York, U.S.	
19	Win	18–0 (1)	Tommy Milton	PTS	6	Mar 20, 1926	Ridgewood Grove, New York City, New York, U.S.	
18	Win	17–0 (1)	Jacinto Valdez	PTS	4	Mar 11, 1926	Commonwealth Sporting Club, New York City, New York, U.S.	
17	Win	16–0 (1)	Bobby Wolgast	PTS	6	Mar 6, 1926	Ridgewood Grove, New York City, New York, U.S.	
16	Win	15–0 (1)	Al Scorda	PTS	4	Feb 18, 1926	Broadway Arena, New York City, New York, U.S.	
15	Win	14–0 (1)	Romeo Vaughn	PTS	6	Feb 13, 1926	Ridgewood Grove, New York City, New York, U.S.	
14	Win	13–0 (1)	Mickey Lewis	PTS	4	Jan 26, 1926	Pioneer Sporting Club, New York City, New York, U.S.	
13	Win	12–0 (1)	Kid Rash	PTS	4	Jan 21, 1926	Broadway Arena, New York City, New York, U.S.	
12	Win	11–0 (1)	George Nickfor	TKO	4 (6)	Jan 13, 1926	Manhattan Casino, New York City, New York, U.S.	
11	Win	10–0 (1)	Danny Terris	KO	4 (4)	Dec 23, 1925	Madison Square Garden, New York City, New York, U.S.	
10	Win	9–0 (1)	Danny Terris	PTS	6	Dec 7, 1925	Broadway Arena, New York City, New York, U.S.	
9	Win	8–0 (1)	Ralph Nischo	PTS	4	Nov 26, 1925	Ridgewood Grove, New York City, New York, U.S.	
8	Win	7–0 (1)	Harry Brandon	PTS	4	Nov 12, 1925	Broadway Arena, New York City, New York, U.S.	
7	Win	6–0 (1)	Henry Molinari	KO	1 (6)	Nov 7, 1925	Ridgewood Grove, New York City, New York, U.S.	
6	Win	5–0 (1)	Johnny Huber	PTS	6	Oct 10, 1925	Commonwealth Sporting Club, New York City, New York, U.S.	
5	Win	4–0 (1)	Paulie Porter	KO	5 (6)	Sep 12, 1925	Ridgewood Grove, New York City, New York, U.S.	
4	Win	3–0 (1)	Henry Usse	PTS	6	Aug 22, 1925	Ridgewood Grove, New York City, New York, U.S.	
3	Win	2–0 (1)	Henry Usse	PTS	6	Aug 8, 1925	Ridgewood Grove, New York City, New York, U.S.	
2	Win	1–0 (1)	Ray Cummings	NWS	4	Aug 5, 1925	Bayonne Stadium, Bayonne, New Jersey, U.S.	
1	Win	1–0	Jack Grodner	KO	1 (4)	Jul 24, 1925	Arena, Rockaway Beach, New York City, New York, U.S.	

=== Unofficial record ===
175 fights	141 wins	24 losses
By knockout	44	1
By decision	97	22
By disqualification	0	1
Draws	10	

Record with the inclusion of newspaper decisions in the win/loss/draw column.

No.	Result	Record	Opponent	Type	Round	Date	Location	Notes
175	Loss	141–24–10	Al Bummy Davis	TKO	3 (10)	Nov 1, 1939	Madison Square Garden, New York City, New York, U.S.	
174	Win	141–23–10	Eddie Brink	PTS	8	Sep 19, 1939	Broadway Arena, New York City, New York, U.S.	
173	Win	140–23–10	Gerald D'Elia	PTS	8	Aug 26, 1939	Thompson's Stadium, New York City, New York, U.S.	
172	Win	139–23–10	Frankie Wallace	PTS	8	Aug 18, 1939	Long Beach Stadium, Long Beach, New Jersey, U.S.	
171	Win	138–23–10	Joe De Jesus	PTS	8	Aug 3, 1939	Fort Hamilton Arena, New York City, New York, U.S.	
170	Win	137–23–10	Ambrose Logan	PTS	8	Jul 17, 1939	Coney Island Velodrome, New York City, New York, U.S.	
169	Win	136–23–10	Joe De Jesus	PTS	8	Jul 6, 1939	Woodcliff Park, Poughkeepsie, New York, U.S.	
168	Loss	135–23–10	Harris Blake	PTS	10	Jun 5, 1939	Broadway Auditorium, Buffalo, New York, U.S.	
167	Draw	135–22–10	Nick Camarata	SD	10	May 15, 1939	Municipal Auditorium, New Orleans, Louisiana, U.S.	
166	Loss	135–22–9	Jimmy Tygh	SD	10	May 1, 1939	Arena, Philadelphia, Pennsylvania, U.S.	
165	Draw	135–21–9	Jimmy Vaughn	PTS	10	Apr 11, 1939	New York Coliseum, New York City, New York, U.S.	
164	Loss	135–21–8	Eddie Brink	SD	10	Mar 28, 1939	Hippodrome, New York City, New York, U.S.	
163	Win	135–20–8	Eddie Brink	PTS	8	Mar 7, 1939	New York Coliseum, New York City, New York, U.S.	
162	Win	134–20–8	Bobby Pacho	PTS	10	Feb 7, 1939	Olympic Auditorium, Los Angeles, California, U.S.	
161	Win	133–20–8	Everett Simington	TKO	3 (10)	Jan 31, 1939	Civic Auditorium, San Jose, California, U.S.	
160	Win	132–20–8	Joe Govras	TKO	2 (10)	Jan 27, 1939	Dreamland Auditorium, San Francisco, California, U.S.	
159	Win	131–20–8	Wally Hally	UD	10	Jan 19, 1939	City Auditorium, Denver, Colorado, U.S.	
158	Win	130–20–8	Eddie Zivic	PTS	10	Dec 30, 1938	Hippodrome, New York City, New York, U.S.	
157	Win	129–20–8	Jimmy Murray	PTS	8	Dec 1, 1938	Ridgewood Grove, New York City, New York, U.S.	
156	Win	128–20–8	Howard Scott	MD	8	Nov 22, 1938	New York Coliseum, New York City, New York, U.S.	
155	Win	127–20–8	Al Dunbard	KO	3 (10)	Nov 1, 1938	Convention Hall, Camden, New Jersey, U.S.	
154	Win	126–20–8	Howard Scott	PTS	8	Oct 26, 1938	Braddock Arena, Jersey City, New Jersey, U.S.	
153	Loss	125–20–8	Eddie Zivic	MD	10	Oct 17, 1938	Town Hall, Scranton, Pennsylvania, U.S.	
152	Loss	125–19–8	Lou Ambers	UD	15	May 7, 1937	Madison Square Garden, New York City, New York, U.S.	For NYSAC, NBA, and The Ring lightweight titles
151	Win	125–18–8	Joey Zodda	KO	7 (10)	Apr 24, 1937	Ridgewood Grove, New York City, New York, U.S.	
150	Win	124–18–8	Frankie Wallace	PTS	8	Apr 13, 1937	Broadway Arena, New York City, New York, U.S.	
149	Win	123–18–8	George Levy	TKO	7 (10)	Apr 5, 1937	Madison Square Garden, New York City, New York, U.S.	
148	Loss	122–18–8	Jimmy McLarnin	UD	10	Oct 5, 1936	Madison Square Garden, New York City, New York, U.S.	
147	Loss	122–17–8	Lou Ambers	UD	15	Sep 3, 1936	Madison Square Garden, New York City, New York, U.S.	Lost NYSAC, NBA, and The Ring lightweight titles
146	Win	122–16–8	Jimmy McLarnin	UD	10	May 8, 1936	Madison Square Garden, New York City, New York, U.S.	
145	Win	121–16–8	Johnny Jadick	PTS	10	Apr 9, 1936	St. Nicholas Arena, New York City, New York, U.S.	
144	Win	120–16–8	Steve Halaiko	KO	2 (8)	Mar 2, 1936	St. Nicholas Arena, New York City, New York, U.S.	
143	Win	119–16–8	Billy Hogan	KO	4 (10)	Feb 15, 1936	Ridgewood Grove, New York City, New York, U.S.	
142	Win	118–16–8	Tootsie Bashara	TKO	3 (10)	Jan 30, 1936	Olympia A.C., Philadelphia, Pennsylvania, U.S.	
141	Win	117–16–8	Midget Mexico	TKO	9 (10)	Jan 22, 1936	Star Casino, New York City, New York, U.S.	
140	Win	116–16–8	Al Roth	UD	15	Oct 4, 1935	Madison Square Garden, New York City, New York, U.S.	Retained NYSAC, NBA, and The Ring lightweight titles
139	Win	115–16–8	Joe Ghnouly	UD	10	Sep 13, 1935	Arena, Saint Louis, Missouri, U.S.	
138	Win	114–16–8	Frankie Klick	PTS	10	Aug 19, 1935	Civic Auditorium, San Francisco, California, U.S.	
137	Win	113–16–8	Bobby Pacho	PTS	10	Jul 25, 1935	Mills Stadium, Chicago, Illinois, U.S.	
136	Win	112–16–8	Frankie Klick	SD	12	Jun 10, 1935	Griffith Stadium, Washington, District of Columbia, U.S.	
135	Win	111–16–8	Lou Ambers	UD	15	May 10, 1935	Madison Square Garden, New York City, New York, U.S.	Won vacant NYSAC, NBA, and The Ring lightweight titles
134	Win	110–16–8	Eddie Zivic	TKO	7 (10)	Apr 25, 1935	Motor Square Garden, Pittsburgh, Pennsylvania, U.S.	
133	Win	109–16–8	Chuck Woods	UD	10	Mar 15, 1935	Chicago Stadium, Chicago, Illinois, U.S.	
132	Loss	108–16–8	Chuck Woods	PTS	10	Feb 26, 1935	Chicago Stadium, Chicago, Illinois, U.S.	
131	Win	108–15–8	Leo Rodak	UD	10	Jan 31, 1935	Chicago Stadium, Chicago, Illinois, U.S.	
130	Win	107–15–8	Honeyboy Hughes	PTS	10	Jan 21, 1935	Convention Hall, Utica, New York, U.S.	
129	Win	106–15–8	Eddie Ran	KO	2 (10)	Jan 7, 1935	Laurel Garden, Newark, New Jersey, U.S.	
128	Win	105–15–8	Harry Dublinsky	PTS	10	Sep 26, 1934	Ebbets Field, New York City, New York, U.S.	
127	Loss	104–15–8	Harry Dublinsky	PTS	10	Aug 29, 1934	Ebbets Field, New York City, New York, U.S.	
126	Win	104–14–8	Frankie Klick	TKO	9 (10)	Jun 28, 1934	Ebbets Field, New York City, New York, U.S.	
125	Win	103–14–8	Baby Arizmendi	PTS	10	Mar 13, 1934	Olympic Auditorium, Los Angeles, California, U.S.	
124	Win	102–14–8	Pete Nebo	PTS	12	Mar 1, 1934	Convention Hall, Kansas City, Missouri, U.S.	
123	Win	101–14–8	Cleto Locatelli	MD	12	Feb 2, 1934	Madison Square Garden, New York City, New York, U.S.	
122	Win	100–14–8	Cleto Locatelli	UD	10	Dec 15, 1933	Madison Square Garden, New York City, New York, U.S.	
121	Win	99–14–8	Cecil Payne	KO	5 (10)	Dec 4, 1933	Public Hall, Cleveland, Ohio, U.S.	
120	Win	98–14–8	Kid Chocolate	KO	2 (10)	Nov 24, 1933	Madison Square Garden, New York City, New York, U.S.	
119	Win	97–14–8	Frankie Klick	UD	10	Oct 28, 1933	Ridgewood Grove, New York City, New York, U.S.	
118	Loss	96–14–8	Barney Ross	SD	15	Sep 12, 1933	Polo Grounds, New York City, New York, U.S.	For NYSAC, NBA, and The Ring lightweight titles; For world light-welterweight title
117	Loss	96–13–8	Barney Ross	MD	10	Jun 23, 1933	Chicago Stadium, Chicago, Illinois, U.S.	Lost NYSAC, NBA, and The Ring lightweight titles; Lost world light-welterweight title
116	Win	96–12–8	Battling Shaw	UD	10	May 21, 1933	Heinemann Park, New Orleans, Louisiana, U.S.	Won World light-welterweight title
115	Loss	95–12–8	Wesley Ramey	PTS	10	Apr 20, 1933	Civic Auditorium, Grand Rapids, Michigan, U.S.	
114	Win	95–11–8	Pete Nebo	PTS	10	Feb 23, 1933	Madison Square Garden Stadium, Miami, Florida, U.S.	
113	Win	94–11–8	Billy Townsend	KO	1 (10)	Feb 3, 1933	Madison Square Garden, New York City, New York, U.S.	
112	Win	93–11–8	Billy Petrolle	UD	15	Nov 4, 1932	Madison Square Garden, New York City, New York, U.S.	Retained NYSAC, NBA, and The Ring lightweight titles
111	Win	92–11–8	Frankie Petrolle	KO	3 (10)	Oct 12, 1932	Ebbets Field, New York City, New York, U.S.	
110	Win	91–11–8	Lew Kirsch	TKO	3 (10)	Sep 29, 1932	Queensboro Stadium, New York City, New York, U.S.	
109	Loss	90–11–8	Johnny Jadick	SD	10	Jul 18, 1932	Baker Bowl, Philadelphia, Pennsylvania, U.S.	For NBA light-welterweight title
108	Win	90–10–8	Harry Dublinsky	SD	10	Jun 16, 1932	Sparta Stadium, Chicago, Illinois, U.S.	
107	Win	89–10–8	Battling Gizzy	PTS	5 (10)	May 23, 1932	Meyers Bowl, North Braddock, New Jersey, U.S.	
106	Win	88–10–8	Ray Kiser	UD	10	Apr 4, 1932	Coliseum Arena, New Orleans, Louisiana, U.S.	
105	Win	87–10–8	Lew Massey	UD	10	Feb 15, 1932	Arena, Philadelphia, Pennsylvania, U.S.	
104	Loss	86–10–8	Johnny Jadick	UD	10	Jan 18, 1932	Arena, Philadelphia, Pennsylvania, U.S.	Lost NBA light-welterweight title
103	Win	86–9–8	Kid Chocolate	SD	15	Nov 20, 1931	Polo Grounds, New York City, New York, U.S.	Retained NYSAC, NBA, and The Ring lightweight titles
102	Win	85–9–8	Philly Griffin	UD	10	Oct 29, 1931	Polo Grounds, New York City, New York, U.S.	Retained NBA light-welterweight title
101	Win	84–9–8	Jack Kid Berg	UD	15	Sep 10, 1931	Polo Grounds, New York City, New York, U.S.	Retained NYSAC, NBA, and The Ring lightweight titles; Retained NBA light-welterweight title
100	Win	83–9–8	Cecil Payne	PTS	10	Jul 13, 1931	Wrigley Field, Los Angeles, California, U.S.	Retained NBA light-welterweight title
99	Win	82–9–8	Herman Perlick	PTS	10	Jun 25, 1931	White City Stadium, West Haven, Connecticut, USA	
98	Win	81–9–8	Jack Kid Berg	KO	3 (10)	Apr 24, 1931	Chicago Stadium, Chicago, Illinois, U.S.	Retained NYSAC, NBA, and The Ring lightweight titles; Won NBA light-welterweight title
97	Win	80–9–8	Tommy Grogan	PTS	10	Mar 23, 1931	Arena, Philadelphia, Pennsylvania, U.S.	
96	Loss	79–9–8	Sammy Fuller	UD	10	Mar 6, 1931	Boston Garden, Boston, Illinois, U.S.	
95	Win	79–8–8	Joey Kaufman	TKO	1 (10)	Feb 25, 1931	Hollywood Arena, Jersey City, New Jersey, U.S.	
94	Win	78–8–8	Johnny Farr	NWS	10	Jan 26, 1931	Coliseum Arena, New Orleans, Louisiana, U.S.	
93	Win	77–8–8	Al Singer	KO	1 (15)	Nov 14, 1930	Madison Square Garden, New York City, New York, U.S.	Won NYSAC, NBA, and The Ring lightweight titles
92	Loss	76–8–8	Billy Petrolle	PTS	10	Sep 11, 1930	Chicago Stadium, Chicago, Illinois, U.S.	
91	Win	76–7–8	Goldie Hess	PTS	10	Aug 28, 1930	Queensboro Stadium, New York City, New York, U.S.	
90	Win	75–7–8	Benny Bass	UD	10	Jul 21, 1930	Shibe Park, Philadelphia, Pennsylvania, U.S.	
89	Win	74–7–8	Tommy Grogan	PTS	10	Jun 24, 1930	Queensboro Stadium, New York City, New York, U.S.	
88	Win	73–7–8	Joe Glick	PTS	10	Jun 4, 1930	Ebbets Field, New York City, New York, U.S.	
87	Win	72–7–8	Johnny Farr	PTS	10	May 14, 1930	Arena, New Haven, Connecticut, U.S.	
86	Win	71–7–8	Harry Carlton	UD	10	May 5, 1930	St. Nicholas Arena, New York City, New York, U.S.	
85	Win	70–7–8	Frankie LaFay	TKO	1 (10)	Apr 8, 1930	Broadway Arena, New York City, New York, U.S.	
84	Win	69–7–8	Steve Smith	TKO	7 (10)	Apr 1, 1930	Arena, New Haven, Connecticut, U.S.	
83	Win	68–7–8	Stanislaus Loayza	UD	10	Mar 14, 1930	Madison Square Garden, New York City, New York, U.S.	
82	Win	67–7–8	Solly Ritz	TKO	1 (10)	Mar 4, 1930	Broadway Arena, New York City, New York, U.S.	
81	Loss	66–7–8	Jack Kid Berg	SD	10	Jan 17, 1930	Madison Square Garden, New York City, New York, U.S.	
80	Win	66–6–8	Stanislaus Loayza	UD	10	Oct 30, 1929	Coliseum, Chicago, Illinois, U.S.	
79	Win	65–6–8	Johnny Farr	PTS	10	Oct 18, 1929	Madison Square Garden, New York City, New York, U.S.	
78	Win	64–6–8	Eddie Mack	TKO	8 (10)	Sep 27, 1929	Chicago Stadium, Chicago, Illinois, U.S.	
77	Win	63–6–8	Eddie Wolfe	PTS	10	Sep 20, 1929	Heinemann Park, New Orleans, Louisiana, U.S.	
76	Loss	62–6–8	Sammy Mandell	SD	10	Aug 2, 1929	Chicago Stadium, Chicago, Illinois, U.S.	For NYSAC, NBA, and The Ring lightweight titles
75	Win	62–5–8	Phil McGraw	PTS	10	Jul 9, 1929	Queensboro Stadium, New York City, New York, U.S.	
74	Win	61–5–8	Ignacio Fernandez	PTS	10	Jun 4, 1929	Queensboro Stadium, New York City, New York, U.S.	
73	Win	60–5–8	André Routis	UD	10	May 10, 1929	Chicago Stadium, Chicago, Illinois, U.S.	
72	Win	59–5–8	Sammy Dorfman	PTS	10	Apr 26, 1929	Madison Square Garden, New York City, New York, U.S.	
71	Win	58–5–8	Cowboy Eddie Anderson	NWS	10	Apr 9, 1929	Auditorium, Milwaukee, Wisconsin, U.S.	
70	Win	57–5–8	Cecil Payne	PTS	10	Mar 8, 1929	Olympia Stadium, Detroit, Michigan, U.S.	
69	Win	56–5–8	Ignacio Fernandez	UD	10	Feb 26, 1929	Coliseum, Chicago, Illinois, U.S.	
68	Win	55–5–8	Joey Sangor	TKO	7 (10)	Feb 6, 1929	Coliseum, Chicago, Illinois, U.S.	
67	Win	54–5–8	Armando Santiago	KO	5 (10)	Jan 18, 1929	Coliseum, Chicago, Illinois, U.S.	
66	Draw	53–5–8	Al Singer	MD	10	Dec 14, 1929	Coliseum, Chicago, Illinois, U.S.	
65	Win	53–5–7	Chick Suggs	KO	6 (10)	Dec 8, 1928	Olympia Boxing Club, New York City, New York, U.S.	
64	Win	52–5–7	Gaston Charles	PTS	10	Oct 29, 1928	Broadway Arena, New York City, New York, U.S.	
63	Loss	51–5–7	André Routis	SD	15	Sep 28, 1928	Madison Square Garden, New York City, New York, U.S.	Lost NYSAC, NBA, and The Ring featherweight titles
62	Win	51–4–7	Bobby Garcia	KO	1 (10)	Aug 28, 1928	Velodrome, Newark, New Jersey, U.S.	
61	Loss	50–4–7	Harry Blitman	PTS	10	Jun 27, 1928	Baker Bowl, Philadelphia, Pennsylvania, U.S.	
60	Win	50–3–7	Vic Foley	PTS	10	Jun 13, 1928	Baseball Stadium, Montreal, Quebec, Canada	
59	Win	49–3–7	Claude Wilson	TKO	1 (10)	May 28, 1928	Coliseum Arena, New Orleans, Louisiana, U.S.	
58	Win	48–3–7	Pete Passifiume	PTS	4	Feb 23, 1928	Broadway Arena, New York City, New York, U.S.	
57	Win	47–3–7	Benny Bass	SD	15	Feb 10, 1928	Madison Square Garden, New York City, New York, U.S.	Retained NYSAC and The Ring featherweight titles; Won NBA featherweight title
56	Draw	46–3–7	Pete Nebo	SD	10	Jan 30, 1928	Arena, Philadelphia, Pennsylvania, U.S.	
55	Win	46–3–6	Bud Taylor	UD	10	Dec 30, 1927	Madison Square Garden, New York City, New York, U.S.	
54	Win	45–3–6	Ignacio Fernandez	UD	10	Dec 1, 1927	Madison Square Garden, New York City, New York, U.S.	
53	Win	44–3–6	Vicent DiLeo	TKO	1 (4)	Nov 22, 1927	Olympia Boxing Club, New York City, New York, U.S.	
52	Win	43–3–6	Billy Henry	KO	2 (10)	Nov 7, 1927	Arena, Philadelphia, Pennsylvania, U.S.	
51	Win	42–3–6	Johnny Dundee	UD	15	Oct 24, 1927	Madison Square Garden, New York City, New York, U.S.	Won vacant NYSAC and The Ring featherweight titles
50	Win	41–3–6	Tommy Ryan	PTS	10	Oct 3, 1927	Broadway Arena, New York City, New York, U.S.	
49	Loss	40–3–6	Cowboy Eddie Anderson	DQ	3 (10)	Sep 2, 1927	Mills Stadium, Chicago, Illinois, U.S.	
48	Win	40–2–6	Joe Rivers	NWS	10	Aug 25, 1927	Kansas City, Kansas, U.S.	
47	Win	39–2–6	Pete Sarmiento	KO	1 (10)	Aug 17, 1927	Ebbets Field, New York City, New York, U.S.	
46	Win	38–2–6	Cowboy Eddie Anderson	PTS	10	Aug 9, 1927	Queensboro Stadium, New York City, New York, U.S.	
45	Win	37–2–6	California Joe Lynch	PTS	10	Jul 27, 1927	Olympic Arena, New York City, New York, U.S.	
44	Loss	36–2–6	Bud Taylor	UD	10	Jun 24, 1927	Wrigley Field, Chicago, Illinois, U.S.	For NBA bantamweight title
43	Win	36–1–6	Ray Rychell	TKO	7 (10)	May 3, 1927	Coliseum, Chicago, Illinois, U.S.	
42	Win	35–1–6	Harold Smith	TKO	3 (10)	Apr 24, 1927	Broadway Arena, New York City, New York, U.S.	
41	Draw	34–1–6	Vic Burrone	PTS	10	Apr 18, 1927	St. Nicholas Arena, New York City, New York, U.S.	
40	Draw	34–1–5	Bud Taylor	PTS	10	Mar 26, 1927	Coliseum, Chicago, Illinois, U.S.	For vacant NBA bantamweight title
39	Win	34–1–4	California Joe Lynch	PTS	10	Mar 7, 1927	Broadway Arena, New York City, New York, U.S.	
38	Win	33–1–4	Johnny Green	PTS	8	Feb 4, 1927	Madison Square Garden, New York City, New York, U.S.	
37	Win	32–1–4	Vic Burrone	PTS	10	Jan 22, 1927	Manhattan Casino, New York City, New York, U.S.	
36	Draw	31–1–4	Joe Ryder	PTS	10	Jan 12, 1927	Manhattan Casino, New York City, New York, U.S.	
35	Win	31–1–3	Bushy Graham	PTS	10	Dec 17, 1926	Madison Square Garden, New York City, New York, U.S.	
34	Win	30–1–3	André Routis	PTS	12	Nov 22, 1926	Broadway Arena, New York City, New York, U.S.	
33	Win	29–1–3	Enrique Savaardo	TKO	5 (10)	Nov 13, 1926	Walker A.C., New York City, New York, U.S.	
32	Loss	28–1–3	Davey Abad	PTS	10	Nov 6, 1926	Ridgewood Grove, New York City, New York, U.S.	
31	Win	28–0–3	Benny Hall	PTS	6	Oct 5, 1926	Pioneer Sporting Club, New York City, New York, U.S.	
30	Win	27–0–3	George Marks	PTS	6	Sep 20, 1926	Dexter Park Arena, Woodhaven, New York City, New York, U.S.	
29	Draw	26–0–3	Georgie Mack	PTS	6	Aug 28, 1926	Queensboro Stadium, New York City, New York, U.S.	
28	Win	26–0–2	Buck Josephs	PTS	6	Aug 14, 1926	Ridgewood Grove, New York City, New York, U.S.	
27	Win	25–0–2	Young Montreal	PTS	6	Aug 9, 1926	Dexter Park Arena, Woodhaven, New York City, New York, U.S.	
26	Win	24–0–2	Manny Wexler	KO	5 (6)	Jul 26, 1926	Dexter Park Arena, Woodhaven, New York City, New York, U.S.	
25	Win	23–0–2	Archie Bell	TKO	5 (6)	Jun 25, 1926	Coney Island Stadium, New York City, New York, U.S.	
24	Win	22–0–2	Willie Suess	PTS	6	Jun 21, 1926	Dexter Park Arena, Woodhaven, New York City, New York, U.S.	
23	Win	21–0–2	Sonny Smith	PTS	6	Jun 16, 1926	Golden City Arena, New York City, New York, U.S.	
22	Win	20–0–2	Sammy Nable	TKO	5 (6)	May 28, 1926	Coney Island Stadium, New York City, New York, U.S.	
21	Draw	19–0–2	Benny Hall	PTS	6	May 8, 1926	Ridgewood Grove, New York City, New York, U.S.	
20	Draw	19–0–1	Mike Esposito	PTS	4	Mar 25, 1926	Madison Square Garden, New York City, New York, U.S.	
19	Win	19–0	Tommy Milton	PTS	6	Mar 20, 1926	Ridgewood Grove, New York City, New York, U.S.	
18	Win	18–0	Jacinto Valdez	PTS	4	Mar 11, 1926	Commonwealth Sporting Club, New York City, New York, U.S.	
17	Win	17–0	Bobby Wolgast	PTS	6	Mar 6, 1926	Ridgewood Grove, New York City, New York, U.S.	
16	Win	16–0	Al Scorda	PTS	4	Feb 18, 1926	Broadway Arena, New York City, New York, U.S.	
15	Win	15–0	Romeo Vaughn	PTS	6	Feb 13, 1926	Ridgewood Grove, New York City, New York, U.S.	
14	Win	14–0	Mickey Lewis	PTS	4	Jan 26, 1926	Pioneer Sporting Club, New York City, New York, U.S.	
13	Win	13–0	Kid Rash	PTS	4	Jan 21, 1926	Broadway Arena, New York City, New York, U.S.	
12	Win	12–0	George Nickfor	TKO	4 (6)	Jan 13, 1926	Manhattan Casino, New York City, New York, U.S.	
11	Win	11–0	Danny Terris	KO	4 (4)	Dec 23, 1925	Madison Square Garden, New York City, New York, U.S.	
10	Win	10–0	Danny Terris	PTS	6	Dec 7, 1925	Broadway Arena, New York City, New York, U.S.	
9	Win	9–0	Ralph Nischo	PTS	4	Nov 26, 1925	Ridgewood Grove, New York City, New York, U.S.	
8	Win	8–0	Harry Brandon	PTS	4	Nov 12, 1925	Broadway Arena, New York City, New York, U.S.	
7	Win	7–0	Henry Molinari	KO	1 (6)	Nov 7, 1925	Ridgewood Grove, New York City, New York, U.S.	
6	Win	6–0	Johnny Huber	PTS	6	Oct 10, 1925	Commonwealth Sporting Club, New York City, New York, U.S.	
5	Win	5–0	Paulie Porter	KO	5 (6)	Sep 12, 1925	Ridgewood Grove, New York City, New York, U.S.	
4	Win	4–0	Henry Usse	PTS	6	Aug 22, 1925	Ridgewood Grove, New York City, New York, U.S.	
3	Win	3–0	Henry Usse	PTS	6	Aug 8, 1925	Ridgewood Grove, New York City, New York, U.S.	
2	Win	2–0	Ray Cummings	NWS	4	Aug 5, 1925	Bayonne Stadium, Bayonne, New Jersey, U.S.	
1	Win	1–0	Jack Grodner	KO	1 (4)	Jul 24, 1925	Arena, Rockaway Beach, New York City, New York, U.S.	

== Titles in boxing ==
=== Major world titles ===
- NYSAC featherweight champion (126 lbs)
- NBA (WBA) featherweight champion (126 lbs)
- NYSAC lightweight champion (135 lbs) (2×)
- NBA (WBA) lightweight champion (135 lbs) (2×)
- NBA (WBA) light welterweight champion (Note: On September 20, 1932, the NBA decided to stop recognizing the division.) (140 lbs)
- World light welterweight champion (140 lbs)

=== The Ring magazine titles ===
- The Ring featherweight champion (126 lbs)
- The Ring lightweight champion (135 lbs) (2×)

=== Undisputed titles ===
- Undisputed featherweight champion (Note: The first ever undisputed featherweight champion.)
- Undisputed lightweight champion (2×)

== See also ==
- Lineal championship
- List of lightweight boxing champions
- List of The Ring world champions
- List of boxing triple champions

== Notes and references ==
=== References ===
Achievements
Preceded by Louis (Kid) Kaplan; Vacated	World Featherweight Champion; February 10, 1928 – September 28, 1928	Succeeded by Andre Routis
Preceded by Al Singer	World Lightweight Champion; November 14, 1930 – June 23, 1933	Succeeded by Barney Ross
Preceded by Jackie (Kid) Berg	World Light Welterweight Champion; April 24, 1931 – January 18, 1932	Succeeded by Johnny Jadick
Preceded by Battling Shaw	World Light Welterweight Champion; May 21, 1933 – June 23, 1933	Succeeded by Barney Ross
Preceded by Barney Ross; Vacated	The Ring Lightweight Champion; May 10, 1935 – September 3, 1936	Succeeded by Lou Ambers
Preceded by Barney Ross; Vacated	World Lightweight Champion; May 10, 1935 – September 3, 1936	Succeeded by Lou Ambers
