= Frankie Klick =

American boxer (1907–1982)

Personal information
- Born: Frank Klich; May 5, 1907 San Francisco, California, U.S.
- Died: May 18, 1982 (aged 75)
- Height: 5 ft 5 in (1.65 m)
- Weight: Junior Lightweight; Lightweight

Boxing career
- Reach: 67.5 in (171 cm)
- Stance: Orthodox

Boxing record
- Total fights: 126
- Wins: 86
- Win by KO: 25
- Losses: 26
- Draws: 13
- No contests: 1

Frankie Klick (May 5, 1907 – May 18, 1982) was an American boxer who became a World Jr. Lightweight boxing champion when he defeated Kid Chocolate, on December 25, 1933, at the arena in Philadelphia, Pennsylvania, in a seventh-round technical knockout. In his career he fought the exceptional champions Henry Armstrong once, Barney Ross twice and Tony Canzoneri four times. His managers were Joe Doran and Ray Carlin.

== Early life and career ==
Frank Klich was born on May 5, 1907, in San Francisco, California. Klick, as he became known when a promoter of one of his early bouts misspelled his name, began his interest in boxing when an older brother gifted him with a pair of boxing gloves when he was nine years old. From October 9, 1924, to April 22, 1927, Klick fought twenty-seven times in San Francisco's National Hall or Dreamland Rink. He won all but one of his first twenty-seven bouts, as one was a draw. Impressively eight of his twenty-seven early wins were by knockout or technical knockout.

On January 28, 1927, Klick defeated California Joe Lynch, a well respected West Coast boxer, for the first time at Dreamland Rink in San Francisco in a six-round points decision. On March 23, 1928, Klick defeated California Joe Lynch again in a four-round points decision at the State Armory in San Francisco. He would fight Lynch twice more in ten round draws.

=== Loss to Joe Murphy ===
In his first loss, and very likely his first knockout, Klick was defeated by Dynamite Joe Murphy in the fourth round at the Auditorium in Oakland, California on June 1, 1927. A left hook to the head dropped Klick to the canvas for a count of eight, and when he arose another attack landed him on the canvas for the full count.

=== Marriage in May 1928 ===
At the age of twenty-one, Klick was married to Cecelia McCarthy on May 6, 1928. The marriage lasted seven years and produced two children Patricia, and Frankie Jr., but ended in divorce on June 5, 1935.

On May 18, 1932, Klick tried unsuccessfully to take the USA California State Lightweight Title, but was defeated by Young Peter Jackson in a ten-round points decision at the Golden Gate Arena in San Francisco California.

== Taking the World Jr. Lightweight Championship against Kid Chocolate ==
Before a crowd of 4,000, Klick took the World Jr. Lightweight boxing champion against Kid Chocolate, on December 25, 1933, at the Arena in Philadelphia, Pennsylvania, in a seventh-round technical knockout. The Ludington Daily News, wrote "The flashy Cuban "bon bon" (Chocolate) was bereft of the title in the seventh round of a scheduled fifteen round Christmas Day bout by a whistling right smash to the chin and all he got in exchange was the second knockout of his career although the latest was of the technical variety." The bout had been fairly close until the seventh with Chocolate showing stamina and style. The seventh round had gone two minutes and fifty-eight seconds when the knockout occurred. "The Cuban waged a fast, aggressive fight in the early rounds that gave him a temporary lead." Chocolate had landed rights "to the head and body," but may have lacked the stamina to stay with Klick. Chocolate may have been suffering from a knockout he had received from Tony Canzoneri only a month previously. He retained his featherweight championship at least in the state of New York.

== Boxing after taking the Jr. Lightweight Title ==
On October 28, 1933, he lost to Tony Canzoneri at Ridgewood Grove in Brooklyn in a ten-round Unanimous Decision. It was the first of four meetings the two would have, and Klick would fail to win a decision in all four. Nonetheless, the capacity Brooklyn crowd of 5000 hailed Klick and booed when he lost the decision.

On January 22, 1934, Klick lost a ten-round points decision to Frankie Wallace, a Cleveland native, at Public Hall in Cleveland, Ohio.

=== First bout with champion Barney Ross ===
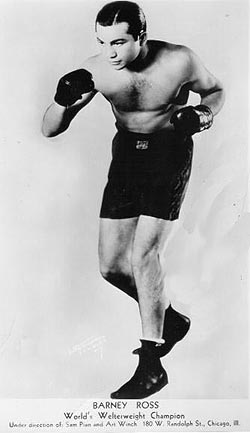
Champion Barney Ross

On March 5, 1934, Klick met Barney Ross, defending his Jr. Welterweight Title before a capacity crowd of 10,000, in a ten-round draw at Civic Auditorium in San Francisco. Klick's quick punching in the last two rounds earned him the draw according to the referee Toby Irwin. The Associated Press gave Ross five rounds, Klick four, and one even. Ross, in his typically lightning fast style, may have landed twice as many punches, but many ringside believed Klick's punches carried more authority. According to the Santa Cruz Evening News, "Klick's swift rallys in the last two rounds earned him the decision of the referee." The draw was impressive for Klick, as Ross had won all his bouts in the previous three years, never having been held to a draw.

=== Vacating the World Jr. Lightweight Title ===
Klick vacated the World Jr. Lightweight Title in 1934, most likely as a result of being unable to maintain a weight under 130 pounds, the limit for the Jr. Lightweight division.

=== Losing to champion Tony Canzoneri ===
On June 28, 1934, Tony Canzoneri defeated Klick in a ninth-round technical knockout when referee Patsy Haley stopped the bout at Ebbets field in Brooklyn. Haley, former lightweight boxer, would become one of the best known and trusted New York referees in history. Klick may have won the first two rounds but by the third Canzoneri had battered Klick with a strong right to the jaw, and began piling up points in the following rounds, landing a hard blow to the eye of Klick in the fifth which contributed to Haley's decision to end the bout four rounds later. The winner of the bout would be matched with Barney Ross for the World Lightweight Crown.

On July 31, 1934, Klick lost a disputed ten round points decision to Italian boxer Cleto Locatelli at Shibe Park, in Philadelphia. A significant crowd of 15,000 voiced their disapproval of the decision, and Ray Carlin, Klick's manager wrote a letter of protest indicating Klick had clearly won six of the ten rounds.

On October 2, 1934, Klick defeated Harry Dublinksky in an important ten round split decision at New York's Madison Square Garden.

Klick would face Canzoneri two more times, on June 10, 1935, in Washington, D.C., and in a non-title fight on August 19, 1935, at Civic Auditorium in San Francisco. He would lose both of the well attended fights, the first in a close twelve round Split Decision by referee Jack Dempsey, and the second in a ten-round points decision. Their first bout was a great tribute to the staying power of Klick, who managed to match one of the greatest fighters of the era at Griffith Stadium in Washington, D.C., before a crowd of 20,000. The bout was not a title fight. A hard right to the face of Klick, may have been the turning point in the judging, and at least one source felt that Canzoneri had done the heavier punching in the close bout. Many fans protested the decision as the judges split their votes, and Dempsey, more a boxing celebrity than an experienced referee, was required to make the call as to who had won the fight.

==== Klick's decline in the fourth and last Canzoneri bout ====
Their second meeting on August 19, 1935, was described as a "dull bout" by the Oakland Tribune. Noting a decline in his fighting style, the Tribune, wrote, "the Klick of last evening was a tentative, uncertain chap, who depended almost entirely on a left jab, who missed more punches than could be expected of a world's champion." Canzoneri managed to outpunch Klick for nearly the entire bout. Canzoneri was noted as having an advantage in every round but the seventh. Canzoneri was easily one of the greatest, and fastest boxers of the era, and hardly an easy target. Both boxers had fought over one hundred bouts, a telling number, and both were nearing thirty, which may have been a factor in their lack of snap and stamina.

=== Second bout with Barney Ross ===
On January 28, 1935, Barney Ross retained his Jr. Welterweight crown in a title bout against Klick before a crowd of 13,000 at Municipal Stadium in Miami, Florida. Ross's Lightweight Title was not at stake. Ross scored the only knockdown of the fight, with a blow to the chin of Klick in the second round. With Ross showing greater confidence and technique, the Associated Press gave him eight of the ten rounds, though he received a hard right from Klick in the sixth round.

On November 22, 1935, Klick defeated Al Roth in a ten-round points decision at Madison Square Garden. Klick was still hoping for a Lightweight Title fight with Canzoneri, though one never materialized.

=== Loss to Lou Ambers ===
On January 3, 1936, Klick lost to important lightweight contender Lou Ambers in a ten-round Unanimous Decision at Madison Square Garden. The winner of the bout was to earn a World Lightweight Title match with Tony Canzoneri. The Associated Press gave eight round to Ambers and only one to Klick with one even. Only 8,236 fans turned out to see what the Arizona Republic considered a "tame" fight.

On June 9, 1936, Klick lost to Puerto Rican fighter Pedro Montanez in a ten-round points decision. According to one source, Klick was on the "verge of being knocked out three times in the ten round affair."

On May 4, 1937, Klick lost to the great Henry Armstrong in a fourth-round technical knockout at Olympic Auditorium in Los Angeles. Armstrong, along with Barney Ross, would become one of the few triple World Champions in boxing history.

Klick ended his career with two bouts against Al Citrino at National Hall in San Francisco in February and April 1943, drawing in eight rounds in the first, and losing in eight in the second.

Klick lived a relatively long life for a boxer who had fought so many champions and over one hundred fights. He died on May 18, 1982, at the age of 75.

== Professional boxing record ==
| 126 fights | 86 wins | 26 losses |
|---|---|---|
| By knockout | 25 | 4 |
| By decision | 60 | 22 |
| By disqualification | 1 | 0 |
| Draws | 13 | |
| No contests | 1 | |

| No. | Result | Record | Opponent | Type | Round, time | Date | Location | Notes |
|---|---|---|---|---|---|---|---|---|
| 126 | Loss | 86–26–13 (1) | Al Citrino | PTS | 8 | Apr 16, 1943 | National Hall, San Francisco, California, US | |
| 125 | Draw | 86–25–13 (1) | Al Citrino | PTS | 8 | Feb 19, 1943 | National Hall, San Francisco, California, US | |
| 124 | Loss | 86–25–12 (1) | Clever Henry | PTS | 10 | Jan 13, 1939 | Civic Auditorium, Honolulu, Hawaii | |
| 123 | Loss | 86–24–12 (1) | Johnny Bellus | PTS | 10 | Mar 17, 1938 | Arena, New Haven, Connecticut, US | |
| 122 | Win | 86–23–12 (1) | Felix Garcia | PTS | 8 | Jan 18, 1938 | New York Coliseum, New York City, New York, US | |
| 121 | Loss | 85–23–12 (1) | Billy Beauhuld | PTS | 10 | Sep 27, 1937 | Royal Windsor Palace, New York City, New York, US | |
| 120 | Loss | 85–22–12 (1) | Henry Armstrong | TKO | 4 (10), 2:57 | May 4, 1937 | Olympic Auditorium, Los Angeles, California, US | |
| 119 | Loss | 85–21–12 (1) | Enrico Venturi | MD | 10 | Nov 13, 1936 | Madison Square Garden, New York City, New York, US | |
| 118 | Loss | 85–20–12 (1) | Jimmy Garrison | PTS | 10 | Sep 1, 1936 | Municipal Auditorium, Kansas City, Missouri, US | |
| 117 | Win | 85–19–12 (1) | Eddie Zivic | UD | 10 | Aug 24, 1936 | Hickey Park Bowl, Millvale, Pennsylvania, US | |
| 116 | Loss | 84–19–12 (1) | Howard Scott | SD | 10 | Aug 3, 1936 | Griffith Stadium, Washington, DC, US | |
| 115 | Loss | 84–18–12 (1) | Jimmy Vaughn | SD | 10 | Jul 20, 1936 | Swiss Park Open Air Arena, Louisville, Kentucky, US | |
| 114 | Loss | 84–17–12 (1) | Pedro Montañez | PTS | 10 | Jun 8, 1936 | Dyckman Oval, New York City, New York, US | |
| 113 | Win | 84–16–12 (1) | Rafael Hurtado | UD | 10 | Apr 20, 1936 | St. Nicholas Arena, New York City, New York, US | |
| 112 | Loss | 83–16–12 (1) | Lou Ambers | PTS | 10 | Jan 3, 1936 | Madison Square Garden, New York City, New York, US | |
| 111 | Win | 83–15–12 (1) | Al Roth | PTS | 10 | Nov 22, 1935 | Madison Square Garden, New York City, New York, US | |
| 110 | Loss | 82–15–12 (1) | Tony Canzoneri | PTS | 10 | Aug 19, 1935 | Civic Auditorium, San Francisco, California, US | |
| 109 | Loss | 82–14–12 (1) | Tony Canzoneri | SD | 12 | Jun 10, 1935 | Griffith Stadium, Washington, DC, US | |
| 108 | Loss | 82–13–12 (1) | Barney Ross | UD | 10 | Jan 28, 1935 | Municipal Stadium, Miami, Florida, US | For world junior welterweight title |
| 107 | Win | 82–12–12 (1) | Harry Dublinsky | SD | 10 | Nov 2, 1934 | Madison Square Garden, New York City, New York, US | |
| 106 | Loss | 81–12–12 (1) | Cleto Locatelli | SD | 10 | Jul 31, 1934 | Baker Bowl, Philadelphia, Pennsylvania, US | |
| 105 | Loss | 81–11–12 (1) | Tony Canzoneri | TKO | 9 (10) | Jun 28, 1934 | Ebbets Field, New York City, New York, US | |
| 104 | Draw | 81–10–12 (1) | Barney Ross | PTS | 10 | Mar 5, 1934 | Civic Auditorium, San Francisco, California, US | For world junior welterweight title |
| 103 | Loss | 81–10–11 (1) | Frankie Wallace | PTS | 10 | Jan 22, 1934 | Public Hall, Cleveland, Ohio, US | |
| 102 | Win | 81–9–11 (1) | Kid Chocolate | TKO | 7 (15), 2:58 | Dec 25, 1933 | Arena, Philadelphia, Pennsylvania, US | Won world junior lightweight title |
| 101 | Loss | 80–9–11 (1) | Eddie Cool | PTS | 10 | Nov 27, 1933 | Arena, Philadelphia, Pennsylvania, US | |
| 100 | Loss | 80–8–11 (1) | Jimmy Leto | PTS | 10 | Nov 13, 1933 | Valley Arena, Holyoke, Massachusetts, US | |
| 99 | Loss | 80–7–11 (1) | Tony Canzoneri | UD | 10 | Oct 28, 1933 | Ridgewood Grove, New York City, New York, US | |
| 98 | Win | 80–6–11 (1) | Tony Falco | PTS | 10 | Sep 22, 1933 | Carlin's Park, Baltimore, Maryland, US | |
| 97 | Win | 79–6–11 (1) | Eddie Cool | PTS | 10 | Sep 8, 1933 | Carlin's Park, Baltimore, Maryland, US | |
| 96 | Draw | 78–6–11 (1) | Al Ciullo | PTS | 6 | Aug 29, 1933 | Fugazy Bowl, New York City, New York, US | |
| 95 | Win | 78–6–10 (1) | Joey Kaufman | PTS | 6 | Aug 12, 1933 | Fugazy Bowl, New York City, New York, US | |
| 94 | Win | 77–6–10 (1) | Pedro Nieves | KO | 4 (?) | Jun 5, 1933 | Oakland Outdoor Arena, Jersey City, New Jersey, US | |
| 93 | Win | 76–6–10 (1) | Ernie Tedesco | KO | 5 (6) | Jun 1, 1933 | Fort Hamilton Arena, New York City, New York, US | |
| 92 | Win | 75–6–10 (1) | Johnny Bonito | PTS | 6 | May 27, 1933 | Ridgewood Grove, New York City, New York, US | |
| 91 | Win | 74–6–10 (1) | Tony Scarpati | TKO | 3 (4), 1:46 | May 19, 1933 | Madison Square Garden, New York City, New York, US | |
| 90 | Loss | 73–6–10 (1) | Petey Gulotta | PTS | 6 | Apr 8, 1933 | Ridgewood Grove, New York City, New York, US | |
| 89 | Win | 73–5–10 (1) | Patsy Rubinetti | PTS | 6 | Mar 25, 1933 | Ridgewood Grove, New York City, New York, US | |
| 88 | Win | 72–5–10 (1) | Tony Scarpati | PTS | 6 | Mar 11, 1933 | Ridgewood Grove, New York City, New York, US | |
| 87 | Win | 71–5–10 (1) | Tony Melore | KO | 6 (?) | Feb 3, 1933 | Madison Square Garden, New York City, New York, US | |
| 86 | Win | 70–5–10 (1) | Lou Jallos | PTS | 5 | Jan 13, 1933 | Madison Square Garden, New York City, New York, US | |
| 85 | Win | 69–5–10 (1) | Paolo Villa | PTS | 8 | Jan 9, 1933 | St. Nicholas Arena, New York City, New York, US | |
| 84 | Win | 68–5–10 (1) | Ace Dundee | KO | 3 (?) | Dec 10, 1932 | Broadway Arena, New York City, New York, US | |
| 83 | Draw | 67–5–10 (1) | Bobby Pacho | PTS | 8 | Oct 7, 1932 | Madison Square Garden, New York City, New York, US | |
| 82 | Draw | 67–5–9 (1) | Tony Falco | PTS | 8 | Jul 18, 1932 | Madison Square Garden Bowl, New York City, New York, US | |
| 81 | Win | 67–5–8 (1) | Johnny Chrismas | TKO | 8 (10) | May 25, 1932 | Chestnut St. Arena, Reno, Nevada, US | |
| 80 | Loss | 66–5–8 (1) | Young Peter Jackson | PTS | 10 | May 18, 1932 | Golden Gate Arena, San Francisco, California, US | For USA California State lightweight title |
| 79 | Win | 66–4–8 (1) | Hymie Miller | DQ | 7 (10) | Feb 4, 1932 | Memorial Auditorium, Sacramento, California, US | Miller was DQ'd for a low blow |
| 78 | Win | 65–4–8 (1) | Buddy Ryan | PTS | 10 | Nov 25, 1931 | National Hall, San Francisco, California, US | |
| 77 | Win | 64–4–8 (1) | Frankie Monroe | PTS | 10 | Nov 4, 1931 | 10th Street Arena, Modesto, California, US | |
| 76 | Win | 63–4–8 (1) | Varias Milling | PTS | 10 | Sep 11, 1931 | Legion Stadium, Hollywood, California, US | |
| 75 | Win | 62–4–8 (1) | Sailor Joe Noto | PTS | 10 | Sep 3, 1931 | Veterans Memorial, Vallejo, California, US | |
| 74 | Win | 61–4–8 (1) | Sailor Joe Noto | PTS | 10 | Aug 20, 1931 | San Rafael, California, US | |
| 73 | Win | 60–4–8 (1) | Benny Gallup | PTS | 10 | Jul 14, 1931 | Sonoma A.C., Santa Rosa, California, US | |
| 72 | Win | 59–4–8 (1) | Frankie Monroe | PTS | 10 | Jul 4, 1931 | Klamath A.C., Klamath Falls, Oregon, US | |
| 71 | Win | 58–4–8 (1) | Johnny Chrismas | PTS | 10 | Jun 23, 1931 | Sonoma A.C., Santa Rosa, California, US | |
| 70 | Win | 57–4–8 (1) | Pierre Pothier | PTS | 10 | May 13, 1931 | Legion Hall, Klamath Falls, Oregon, US | |
| 69 | Win | 56–4–8 (1) | Bobby Pacho | PTS | 10 | Mar 13, 1931 | Legion Stadium, Hollywood, California, US | |
| 68 | Win | 55–4–8 (1) | Ray Montoya | PTS | 6 | Feb 20, 1931 | Legion Stadium, Hollywood, California, US | |
| 67 | Win | 54–4–8 (1) | Pierre Pothier | PTS | 10 | Feb 6, 1931 | Community Club Hall, Merrill, Oregon, US | |
| 66 | Draw | 53–4–8 (1) | Santiago Zorrilla | PTS | 10 | Jan 16, 1931 | Dreamland Auditorium, San Francisco, California, US | |
| 65 | Draw | 53–4–7 (1) | Santiago Zorrilla | PTS | 4 | Dec 19, 1930 | Dreamland Auditorium, San Francisco, California, US | |
| 64 | Win | 53–4–6 (1) | Sailor Joe Noto | PTS | 6 | Dec 14, 1930 | Eureka, California, US | |
| 63 | Win | 52–4–6 (1) | Harry Wallace | KO | 1 (?) | Nov 23, 1930 | Eureka, California, US | |
| 62 | Win | 51–4–6 (1) | Sailor Joe Noto | PTS | 10 | Nov 18, 1930 | Forman's Arena, San Jose, California, US | |
| 61 | Win | 50–4–6 (1) | Bobby Gray | TKO | 7 (10) | Nov 4, 1930 | Forman's Arena, San Jose, California, US | |
| 60 | NC | 49–4–6 (1) | Jackie Spencer | NC | 10 (10) | Sep 30, 1930 | Reno Arena, Reno, Nevada, US | No contest for 'not fighting' |
| 59 | Win | 49–4–6 | Battling Bulahan | PTS | 10 | Jul 1, 1930 | 10th Street Arena, Modesto, California, US | |
| 58 | Win | 48–4–6 | Eddie Graham | TKO | 6 (10) | Jun 13, 1930 | Dreamland Auditorium, San Francisco, California, US | |
| 57 | Win | 47–4–6 | Ward Sparks | PTS | 10 | Mar 6, 1930 | Dreamland Auditorium, San Francisco, California, US | |
| 56 | Loss | 46–4–6 | Maurice Holtzer | PTS | 10 | Jan 3, 1930 | Legion Stadium, Hollywood, California, US | |
| 55 | Win | 46–3–6 | Ignacio Fernández | PTS | 10 | Nov 29, 1929 | Legion Stadium, Hollywood, California, US | |
| 54 | Win | 45–3–6 | Huerta Evans | PTS | 10 | Nov 22, 1929 | Dreamland Auditorium, San Francisco, California, US | |
| 53 | Draw | 44–3–6 | Jackie Spencer | PTS | 10 | Jul 24, 1929 | Lawton Springs Arena, Reno, Nevada, US | |
| 52 | Win | 44–3–5 | Tommy Fielding | PTS | 10 | Jul 5, 1929 | Dreamland Auditorium, San Francisco, California, US | |
| 51 | Win | 43–3–5 | Wendell 'Red' Humphries | PTS | 10 | Jun 14, 1929 | Dreamland Auditorium, San Francisco, California, US | |
| 50 | Win | 42–3–5 | Bert Foster | KO | 3 (6) | May 24, 1929 | Dreamland Auditorium, San Francisco, California, US | |
| 49 | Win | 41–3–5 | Charlie Miller | TKO | 8 (10) | Apr 24, 1929 | National Hall, San Francisco, California, US | |
| 48 | Draw | 40–3–5 | Charlie Miller | PTS | 10 | Mar 27, 1929 | Reno Arena, Reno, Nevada, US | |
| 47 | Win | 40–3–4 | Bert Foster | PTS | 10 | Mar 15, 1929 | L Street Arena, Sacramento, California, US | |
| 46 | Win | 39–3–4 | Battling Bulahan | PTS | 10 | Jan 30, 1929 | National Hall, San Francisco, California, US | |
| 45 | Win | 38–3–4 | Bobby Herman | PTS | 6 | Dec 14, 1928 | Dreamland Auditorium, San Francisco, California, US | |
| 44 | Draw | 37–3–4 | 'California' Joe Lynch | UD | 10 | Oct 17, 1928 | National Hall, San Francisco, California, US | |
| 43 | Win | 37–3–3 | 'Sailor' Willie Gordon | UD | 10 | Oct 2, 1928 | Armory, Portland, Oregon, US | |
| 42 | Win | 36–3–3 | Sidney White | PTS | 10 | Sep 7, 1928 | El Cerrito A.C., El Cerrito, California, US | |
| 41 | Win | 35–3–3 | Charlie Miller | KO | 4 (8) | Aug 1, 1928 | National Hall, San Francisco, California, US | |
| 40 | Win | 34–3–3 | Bobby Herman | KO | 6 (10) | Jun 20, 1928 | National Hall, San Francisco, California, US | |
| 39 | Win | 33–3–3 | Ignacio Fernández | PTS | 10 | Jun 4, 1928 | State Armory, San Francisco, California, US | |
| 38 | Draw | 32–3–3 | 'California' Joe Lynch | PTS | 10 | Apr 19, 1928 | Stockton, California, US | |
| 37 | Win | 32–3–2 | 'California' Joe Lynch | PTS | 4 | Mar 23, 1928 | State Armory, San Francisco, California, US | |
| 36 | Loss | 31–3–2 | Midget Mike O'Dowd | KO | 3 (10) | Feb 10, 1928 | Golden Gate Arena, San Francisco, California, US | |
| 35 | Win | 31–2–2 | Charlie Miller | TKO | 3 (10) | Feb 3, 1928 | Golden Gate Arena, San Francisco, California, US | |
| 34 | Loss | 30–2–2 | Vic Foley | PTS | 6 | Jan 17, 1928 | Crystal Pool, Seattle, Washington, US | |
| 33 | Win | 30–1–2 | Tommy O'Brien | TKO | 7 (10) | Sep 23, 1927 | Golden Gate Arena, San Francisco, California, US | |
| 32 | Draw | 29–1–2 | Santiago Zorrilla | PTS | 10 | Aug 26, 1927 | Dreamland Rink, San Francisco, California, US | |
| 31 | Win | 29–1–1 | Georgie Lee | PTS | 6 | Jul 4, 1927 | Exposition Arena, Reno, Nevada, US | |
| 30 | Loss | 28–1–1 | Dynamite Joe Murphy | KO | 4 (10) | Jun 1, 1927 | Auditorium, Oakland, California, US | |
| 29 | Win | 28–0–1 | Joe Pimentel | PTS | 10 | May 25, 1927 | National Hall, San Francisco, California, US | |
| 28 | Win | 27–0–1 | Billy Evans | TKO | 9 (10) | Apr 22, 1927 | Dreamland Rink, San Francisco, California, US | |
| 27 | Win | 26–0–1 | Ollie Bartlett | PTS | 6 | Apr 1, 1927 | Dreamland Rink, San Francisco, California, US | |
| 26 | Win | 25–0–1 | 'California' Joe Lynch | PTS | 6 | Jan 28, 1927 | Dreamland Rink, San Francisco, California, US | |
| 25 | Win | 24–0–1 | Leonardo Garcia | PTS | 6 | Jan 7, 1927 | Dreamland Rink, San Francisco, California, US | |
| 24 | Win | 23–0–1 | Joe French | PTS | 6 | Dec 21, 1926 | Dreamland Rink, San Francisco, California, US | |
| 23 | Win | 22–0–1 | Lou Rickard | TKO | 5 (6) | Dec 17, 1926 | Dreamland Rink, San Francisco, California, US | |
| 22 | Win | 21–0–1 | Georgie Lee | PTS | 6 | Dec 3, 1926 | Dreamland Rink, San Francisco, California, US | |
| 21 | Win | 20–0–1 | Davie Flash | TKO | 4 (?) | Nov 26, 1926 | Dreamland Rink, San Francisco, California, US | |
| 20 | Win | 19–0–1 | Sidney White | PTS | 6 | Nov 12, 1926 | Dreamland Rink, San Francisco, California, US | |
| 19 | Draw | 18–0–1 | Sidney White | PTS | 10 | May 12, 1926 | National Hall, San Francisco, California, US | |
| 18 | Win | 18–0 | Sidney White | PTS | 6 | Apr 30, 1926 | Dreamland Rink, San Francisco, California, US | |
| 17 | Win | 17–0 | Jimmy Briggs | TKO | 8 (?) | Mar 23, 1926 | San Rafael, California, US | |
| 16 | Win | 16–0 | Johnny 'Kid' Fiske | TKO | 4 (?) | Feb 19, 1926 | Dreamland Rink, San Francisco, California, US | |
| 15 | Win | 15–0 | Johnny Lawson | TKO | 3 (4) | Feb 12, 1926 | Dreamland Rink, San Francisco, California, US | Lawson turned his ankle and was forced to quit |
| 14 | Win | 14–0 | Fred Bindon | PTS | 4 | Feb 5, 1926 | Dreamland Rink, San Francisco, California, US | |
| 13 | Win | 13–0 | Jimmy Dwyer | PTS | 4 | Jan 13, 1926 | National Hall, San Francisco, California, US | |
| 12 | Win | 12–0 | Pal Bayardo | KO | 1 (4) | Dec 30, 1925 | National Hall, San Francisco, California, US | |
| 11 | Win | 11–0 | Fred Bindon | PTS | 4 | Dec 9, 1925 | National Hall, San Francisco, California, US | |
| 10 | Win | 10–0 | Jimmy Briggs | PTS | 4 | Dec 2, 1925 | National Hall, San Francisco, California, US | |
| 9 | Win | 9–0 | Frankie Kline | KO | 2 (4) | Nov 24, 1925 | Egg City A.C., Petaluma, California, US | |
| 8 | Win | 8–0 | Kid Magsambol | PTS | 4 | Mar 4, 1925 | National Hall, San Francisco, California, US | |
| 7 | Win | 7–0 | Jack Flynn | PTS | 4 | Feb 20, 1925 | Dreamland Rink, San Francisco, California, US | |
| 6 | Win | 6–0 | Phil Dorio | KO | 3 (?) | Jan 14, 1925 | National Hall, San Francisco, California, US | |
| 5 | Win | 5–0 | Jimmy Barry | PTS | 4 | Jan 8, 1925 | National Hall, San Francisco, California, US | |
| 4 | Win | 4–0 | Frankie Wilson | PTS | 4 | Dec 10, 1924 | National Hall, San Francisco, California, US | |
| 3 | Win | 3–0 | Dick Cruz | PTS | 4 | Nov 26, 1924 | National Hall, San Francisco, California, US | |
| 2 | Win | 2–0 | Tommy Baroni | PTS | 4 | Nov 12, 1924 | National Hall, San Francisco, California, US | |
| 1 | Win | 1–0 | Young Manila | PTS | 4 | Oct 29, 1924 | National Hall, San Francisco, California, US | |

== See also ==
- List of super featherweight boxing champions

Achievements
| Preceded by Kid Chocolate | World Jr. Lightweight Champion; December 25, 1933 – Vacated 1934 | Vacant Title next held by Sandy Saddler |
