= Wesley Ramey =

American boxer

Personal information
- Nationality: American
- Born: Wesley Ramey; September 17, 1909 Evart Township, Michigan
- Died: March 10, 1997 (aged 87)
- Height: 5 ft 4 in (1.63 m)
- Weight: Lightweight

Boxing career
- Reach: 67 in (170 cm)

Boxing record
- Total fights: 194
- Wins: 152
- Win by KO: 11
- Losses: 28
- Draws: 14
- No contests: 1

Wesley "Wes" Ramey (September 17, 1909 – March 10, 1997) was an American boxer who was dubbed the "Uncrowned Champion of the Lightweights". Although he was ranked as a top-10 lightweight contender for 10 consecutive years, he was never given a chance to fight for a world title. Over the course of his career he defeated Hall of Famers Tony Canzoneri, Benny Bass, Lew Jenkins and Cocoa Kid. He also faced the likes of Sammy Angott and Pedro Montanez in defeat.

Although lacking in knockout power (he had only 11 knockouts in 152 wins), Ramey possessed excellent lateral movement skills; which allowed him to dart in and out of range. This, coupled with his excellent conditioning gave him a critical edge outpointing his opposition.

Reporter Bill Farnsworth, Jr. wrote, "Wes Ramey … came to Fort Hamilton last night and haunted Joey Costa, the New Jersey lad. Ramey was the ghost. He was so elusive for eight of the rounds that Joey couldn’t have struck him with a handful of buckshot." After retiring from the sport, Ramey ran two successful bars while concurrently training amateur and professional fighters. He was inducted into the International Boxing Hall of Fame in 2013.

== Professional boxing record ==
All information in this section is derived from BoxRec, unless otherwise stated.

=== Official record ===
194 fights	141 wins	28 losses
By knockout	11	4
By decision	129	23
By disqualification	1	1
Draws	12	
Newspaper decisions/draws	13	

All newspaper decisions are officially regarded as “no decision” bouts and are not counted in the win/loss/draw column.

No.	Result	Record	Opponent	Type	Round, time	Date	Location	Notes
194	Win	141–28–12 (13)	Maurice Arnault	PTS	10	Jun 20, 1941	Civic Auditorium, Grand Rapids, Michigan, US	
193	Loss	140–28–12 (13)	Billy Beauhuld	PTS	8	Sep 23, 1940	Meadowbrook Bowl, Newark, New Jersey, US	
192	Win	140–27–12 (13)	Nunzio Bisogno	PTS	10	Jul 22, 1940	Meadowbrook Bowl, Newark, New Jersey, US	
191	Loss	139–27–12 (13)	Dave Castilloux	PTS	8	Apr 23, 1940	New York Coliseum, New York City, New York, US	
190	Win	139–26–12 (13)	Paul DeBello	UD	10	Apr 11, 1940	Civic Auditorium, Grand Rapids, Michigan, US	
189	Loss	138–26–12 (13)	Paul DeBello	PTS	8	Mar 2, 1940	Ridgewood Grove, New York City, New York, US	
188	Win	138–25–12 (13)	Johnny Rinaldi	PTS	8	Feb 20, 1940	New York Coliseum, New York City, New York, US	
187	Win	137–25–12 (13)	Mike Gamiere	UD	10	Jan 18, 1940	Civic Auditorium, Grand Rapids, Michigan, US	
186	Loss	136–25–12 (13)	Mike Gamiere	PTS	10	Jan 5, 1940	Public Hall, Cleveland, Ohio, US	
185	Loss	136–24–12 (13)	Maxie Berger	PTS	8	Dec 12, 1939	New York Coliseum, New York City, New York, US	
184	Win	136–23–12 (13)	Wishy Jones	PTS	10	Oct 16, 1939	Eagles Club, Milwaukee, Wisconsin, US	
183	Win	135–23–12 (13)	Joe Boscarino	UD	10	Sep 7, 1939	Sportatorium, Dallas, Texas, US	
182	Draw	134–23–12 (13)	Paul DeBello	PTS	8	Aug 16, 1939	Airport Stadium, Rochester, New York, US	
181	Win	134–23–11 (13)	Armando Sicilia	PTS	10	Aug 4, 1939	Federation Park, Port Huron, Michigan, US	
180	Loss	133–23–11 (13)	Maxie Berger	UD	10	Jul 5, 1939	Forum, Montreal, Quebec, Canada	For vacant world junior welterweight title (Montreal version)
179	Win	133–22–11 (13)	Leonard Del Genio	PTS	10	Jun 13, 1939	Grand Rapids, Michigan, US	
178	Win	132–22–11 (13)	Emil Joseph	UD	10	May 22, 1939	Hickey Park, Millvale, Pennsylvania, US	
177	Win	131–22–11 (13)	Billy Hardges	PTS	8	Apr 19, 1939	Futuristic Ballroom, Milwaukee, Wisconsin, US	
176	Win	130–22–11 (13)	Maxie Berger	PTS	10	Mar 28, 1939	New York Coliseum, New York City, New York, US	
175	Win	129–22–11 (13)	Wishy Jones	PTS	10	Mar 14, 1939	Grand Rapids, Michigan, US	
174	Win	128–22–11 (13)	Maxie Berger	PTS	8	Feb 21, 1939	New York Coliseum, New York City, New York, US	
173	Win	127–22–11 (13)	Emil Joseph	UD	10	Jan 31, 1939	Motor Square Garden, Pittsburgh, Pennsylvania, US	
172	Win	126–22–11 (13)	Joe Boscarino	PTS	10	Jan 19, 1939	Grand Rapids, Michigan, US	
171	Loss	125–22–11 (13)	Joe Boscarino	KO	5 (10), 1:24	Jan 3, 1939	Convention Hall, Rochester, New York, US	
170	Win	125–21–11 (13)	Russell Brock	PTS	10	Dec 29, 1938	Sportatorium, Dallas, Texas, US	
169	Win	124–21–11 (13)	Lew Jenkins	PTS	10	Dec 16, 1938	Sportatorium, Dallas, Texas, US	Won USA Texas State lightweight title
168	Win	123–21–11 (13)	Paul DeBello	PTS	8	Oct 29, 1938	Ridgewood Grove, New York City, New York, US	
167	Win	122–21–11 (13)	Harry Weekly	PTS	10	Oct 6, 1938	Sportatorium, Dallas, Texas, US	
166	Loss	121–21–11 (13)	Sammy Angott	UD	10	Sep 16, 1938	Sportatorium, Dallas, Texas, US	
165	Win	121–20–11 (13)	Chino Alvarez	PTS	10	Sep 1, 1938	Municipal Stadium, Savannah, Georgia, US	
164	Win	120–20–11 (13)	Eddie Brink	PTS	10	Aug 11, 1938	Grand Rapids, Michigan, US	
163	Win	119–20–11 (13)	Leo Rodak	UD	10	Jul 8, 1938	Sportatorium, Dallas, Texas, US	
162	Loss	118–20–11 (13)	Wishy Jones	PTS	10	Jun 28, 1938	Olympiad Arena, Houston, Texas, US	
161	Win	118–19–11 (13)	Chino Alvarez	MD	10	Jun 24, 1938	Sportatorium, Dallas, Texas, US	
160	Win	117–19–11 (13)	Al Manriquez	PTS	10	Jun 10, 1938	Sportatorium, Dallas, Texas, US	
159	Win	116–19–11 (13)	Bobby Britton	MD	10	Jun 3, 1938	Sportatorium, Dallas, Texas, US	
158	Win	115–19–11 (13)	Johnny Durso	PTS	10	May 24, 1938	Armory, Muskegon, Michigan, US	
157	Loss	114–19–11 (13)	Sammy Angott	UD	10	May 6, 1938	Jefferson County Armory, Louisville, Kentucky, US	
156	Win	114–18–11 (13)	Lew Jenkins	PTS	10	Apr 28, 1938	Sportatorium, Dallas, Texas, US	
155	Win	113–18–11 (13)	Bobby McIntire	PTS	10	Apr 21, 1938	Armory, Muskegon, Michigan, US	
154	Win	112–18–11 (13)	Joey Greb	PTS	10	Apr 11, 1938	Grand Rapids, Michigan, US	
153	Win	111–18–11 (13)	Jimmy Buckler	PTS	10	Apr 1, 1938	Studebaker Clubrooms, South Bend, Indiana, US	
152	Win	110–18–11 (13)	Russell Hayes	TKO	7 (10)	Mar 24, 1938	Armory, Muskegon, Michigan, US	
151	Win	109–18–11 (13)	Jimmy Buckler	PTS	10	Mar 8, 1938	Armory, Muskegon, Michigan, US	
150	Win	108–18–11 (13)	Eddie McGeever	PTS	8	Feb 15, 1938	New York Coliseum, New York City, New York, US	
149	Win	107–18–11 (13)	Wesley Farrell	PTS	6	Jan 12, 1938	Madison Square Garden, New York City, New York, US	
148	Win	106–18–11 (13)	Pete Caracciola	PTS	8	Dec 21, 1937	New York Coliseum, New York City, New York, US	
147	Win	105–18–11 (13)	Charlie Baxter	KO	3 (10)	Dec 10, 1937	Grand Rapids, Michigan, US	
146	Win	104–18–11 (13)	Jimmy Vaughn	PTS	10	Nov 15, 1937	Columbia Gymnasium Arena, Louisville, Kentucky, US	
145	Win	103–18–11 (13)	Joey Alcanter	TKO	7 (10)	Sep 17, 1937	Legion Stadium, Hollywood, California, US	
144	Loss	102–18–11 (13)	Pedro Montañez	KO	1 (10), 2:40	Jul 26, 1937	Gilmore Stadium, Los Angeles, California, US	
143	Win	102–17–11 (13)	Hubert 'Kid' Dennis	MD	10	Jun 7, 1937	Broadway Theater, Butte, Montana, US	
142	Win	101–17–11 (13)	Charley Gomer	PTS	8	May 24, 1937	Dexter Park Arena, New York City, New York, US	
141	Win	100–17–11 (13)	Jimmy Vaughn	PTS	10	May 10, 1937	Broadway Theater, Butte, Montana, US	
140	Win	99–17–11 (13)	Jimmy Buckler	PTS	10	May 4, 1937	Armory, Benton Harbor, Michigan, US	
139	Win	98–17–11 (13)	Dominic Mancini	PTS	10	Mar 15, 1937	Columbia Gymnasium Arena, Louisville, Kentucky, US	
138	Win	97–17–11 (13)	Carl Guggino	PTS	10	Mar 10, 1937	Civic Auditorium, Grand Rapids, Michigan, US	
137	Loss	96–17–11 (13)	Carl Guggino	PTS	6	Feb 26, 1937	Madison Square Garden, New York City, New York, US	
136	Win	96–16–11 (13)	Tommy Rawson Jr.	UD	10	Feb 4, 1937	Eagleston Square Stadium, Boston, Massachusetts, US	
135	Win	95–16–11 (13)	Johnny Jadick	UD	10	Jan 22, 1937	Arena, Syracuse, New York, US	
134	Win	94–16–11 (13)	Rafael Hurtado	PTS	10	Dec 7, 1936	Civic Auditorium, Grand Rapids, Michigan, US	
133	Win	93–16–11 (13)	Tony Petroskey	PTS	10	Nov 20, 1936	Armory, Muskegon, Michigan, US	
132	Win	92–16–11 (13)	Joe Doty	PTS	10	Nov 9, 1936	Armory, Kalamazoo, Michigan, US	
131	Win	91–16–11 (13)	Frankie Wallace	PTS	10	Oct 9, 1936	Civic Auditorium, Grand Rapids, Michigan, US	
130	Win	90–16–11 (13)	Speedy Johnson	PTS	10	Sep 29, 1936	Arena Gardens, Detroit, Michigan, US	
129	Win	89–16–11 (13)	Johnny Green	PTS	6	Sep 22, 1936	Kalamazoo, Michigan, US	
128	Draw	88–16–11 (13)	Rafael Hurtado	PTS	10	Jul 22, 1936	Ebbets Field, New York City, New York, US	
127	Win	88–16–10 (13)	Joey Zodda	KO	5 (10)	Jul 15, 1936	Grand Rapids, Michigan, US	
126	Win	87–16–10 (13)	Jimmy Garrison	SD	10	Jun 24, 1936	Municipal Auditorium, Kansas City, Missouri, US	
125	Draw	86–16–10 (13)	Joey Zodda	PTS	8	Jun 2, 1936	Braddock Bowl, Jersey City, New Jersey, US	
124	Win	86–16–9 (13)	Mickey Genaro	PTS	10	May 19, 1936	The Mart, Muskegon, Michigan, US	
123	Draw	85–16–9 (13)	Eddie Zivic	PTS	10	May 5, 1936	Civic Auditorium, Grand Rapids, Michigan, US	
122	Loss	85–16–8 (13)	Leonard Del Genio	SD	10	Mar 30, 1936	St. Nicholas Arena, New York City, New York, US	
121	Win	85–15–8 (13)	Bobby Pacho	PTS	10	Mar 4, 1936	Civic Auditorium, Grand Rapids, Michigan, US	
120	Win	84–15–8 (13)	Tony Falco	UD	10	Feb 18, 1936	Broadway Arena, New York City, New York, US	
119	Win	83–15–8 (13)	Frankie Williams	PTS	8	Feb 10, 1936	Laurel Garden, Newark, New Jersey, US	
118	Win	82–15–8 (13)	Johnny Lucas	PTS	10	Feb 6, 1936	Olympia A.C., Philadelphia, Pennsylvania, US	
117	Win	81–15–8 (13)	Eddie Cool	UD	10	Jan 28, 1936	Broadway Arena, New York City, New York, US	
116	Draw	80–15–8 (13)	Bobby Pacho	PTS	10	Nov 8, 1935	Civic Auditorium, Grand Rapids, Michigan, US	
115	Win	80–15–7 (13)	Bobby Pacho	PTS	10	Oct 11, 1935	Civic Auditorium, Grand Rapids, Michigan, US	
114	Win	79–15–7 (13)	Steve Halaiko	PTS	6	Oct 4, 1935	Madison Square Garden, New York City, New York, US	
113	Win	78–15–7 (13)	Chuck Woods	PTS	10	Sep 13, 1935	Civic Auditorium, Grand Rapids, Michigan, US	
112	Win	77–15–7 (13)	Jackie Kelly	TKO	8 (10)	Sep 5, 1935	Veterans' of Foreign Wars Arena, Lansing, Michigan, US	
111	Win	76–15–7 (13)	Bucky Keyes	PTS	10	Aug 1, 1935	Fort Hamilton Arena, New York City, New York, US	
110	Win	75–15–7 (13)	Joey Costa	PTS	10	Jul 18, 1935	Fort Hamilton Arena, New York City, New York, US	
109	Win	74–15–7 (13)	Tiger Kid Walker	KO	10 (10)	Jul 10, 1935	Civic Auditorium, Grand Rapids, Michigan, US	
108	Win	73–15–7 (13)	Tiger Kid Walker	PTS	10	Jun 21, 1935	Arena Gardens Bowl, Detroit, Michigan, US	
107	Win	72–15–7 (13)	Leo Rodak	PTS	12	Jun 13, 1935	Mills Stadium, Chicago, Illinois, US	
106	Win	71–15–7 (13)	Steve Halaiko	PTS	10	May 15, 1935	Heinemann Park, New Orleans, Louisiana, US	
105	Win	70–15–7 (13)	Roger Bernard	PTS	10	Apr 10, 1935	Civic Auditorium, Grand Rapids, Michigan, US	
104	Loss	69–15–7 (13)	Maxie Strub	PTS	10	Apr 5, 1935	Carney Auditorium, Erie, Pennsylvania, US	
103	Win	69–14–7 (13)	Frankie Sagilio	PTS	10	Mar 15, 1935	Chicago Stadium, Chicago, Illinois, US	
102	Win	68–14–7 (13)	Jimmy Vaughn	PTS	10	Feb 26, 1935	Olympia Stadium, Detroit, Michigan, US	
101	Win	67–14–7 (13)	Tommy John	KO	2 (10)	Jan 27, 1935	The Ring, London, England, UK	
100	Loss	66–14–7 (13)	Jimmy Walsh	DQ	6 (10)	Jan 21, 1935	Royal Albert Hall, London, England, UK	
99	Win	66–13–7 (13)	Harry Brooks	PTS	12	Dec 30, 1934	The Ring, London, England, UK	
98	Win	65–13–7 (13)	Boyo Rees	PTS	12	Dec 13, 1934	The Stadium, Liverpool, Merseyside, England, UK	
97	Loss	64–13–7 (13)	Jackie Flynn	PTS	12	Nov 5, 1934	City Hall, Cape Town, South Africa	
96	Win	64–12–7 (13)	Louis Botes	PTS	10	Oct 6, 1934	Town Hall, Durban, South Africa	
95	Loss	63–12–7 (13)	Laurie Stevens	PTS	10	Sep 22, 1934	Wanderers Stadium, Johannesburg, South Africa	
94	Loss	63–11–7 (13)	Laurie Stevens	PTS	12	Aug 18, 1934	Wanderers Stadium, Johannesburg, South Africa	
93	Loss	63–10–7 (13)	Jack Carroll	TKO	10 (15), 0:50	May 14, 1934	Sydney Stadium, Sydney, Australia	
92	Win	63–9–7 (13)	Bobby Delaney	PTS	15	Mar 31, 1934	Sydney Stadium, Sydney, Australia	
91	Win	62–9–7 (13)	Jimmy Kelso	PTS	15	Mar 5, 1934	Sydney Stadium, Sydney, Australia	
90	Loss	61–9–7 (13)	Jack Portney	MD	10	Jan 1, 1934	Convention Hall, Rochester, New York, US	
89	Win	61–8–7 (13)	Johnny Stroppa	PTS	10	Dec 18, 1933	Grand Rapids, Michigan, US	
88	Win	60–8–7 (13)	Johnny Stroppa	PTS	10	Dec 1, 1933	Arena Gardens, Detroit, Michigan, US	
87	Win	59–8–7 (13)	Harry Dublinsky	PTS	10	Nov 23, 1933	Auditorium, Milwaukee, Wisconsin, US	
86	Win	58–8–7 (13)	Billy Hogan	UD	6	Nov 14, 1933	Ridgewood Grove, New York City, New York, US	
85	Win	57–8–7 (13)	Ray Bowen	PTS	10	Nov 7, 1933	Portner's Arena, Alexandria, Virginia, US	
84	Draw	56–8–7 (13)	Petey Gulotta	PTS	8	Nov 4, 1933	Ridgewood Grove, New York City, New York, US	
83	Win	56–8–6 (13)	Dick Sisk	PTS	10	Oct 23, 1933	Auditorium, Milwaukee, Wisconsin, US	
82	Loss	55–8–6 (13)	Tony Herrera	PTS	10	Oct 9, 1933	Grand Rapids, Michigan, US	
81	Win	55–7–6 (13)	Jackie Davis	PTS	10	Sep 26, 1933	Coliseum, Cleveland, Ohio, US	
80	Win	54–7–6 (13)	Herbert Lewis Hardwick	UD	10	Aug 31, 1933	Heywood Arena, West Springfield, Massachusetts, US	
79	Loss	53–7–6 (13)	Steve Halaiko	SD	10	Aug 7, 1933	Heywood Arena, West Springfield, Massachusetts, US	
78	Draw	53–6–6 (13)	Jimmy Leto	PTS	10	Jul 26, 1933	South Park Arena, Hartford, Connecticut, US	
77	Win	53–6–5 (13)	Jimmy Slavin	PTS	5	Jul 12, 1933	Polo Grounds, New York City, New York, US	
76	Loss	52–6–5 (13)	Tony Herrera	PTS	10	Jun 16, 1933	Grand Rapids, Michigan, US	
75	Win	52–5–5 (13)	Harry Dublinsky	MD	10	May 19, 1933	Northside Arena, Pittsburgh, Pennsylvania, US	
74	Win	51–5–5 (13)	Roger Bernard	PTS	10	May 8, 1933	I.M.A. Auditorium, Flint, Michigan, US	
73	Win	50–5–5 (13)	Tony Sciolino	PTS	10	May 1, 1933	Broadway Auditorium, Buffalo, New York, US	
72	Win	49–5–5 (13)	Tony Canzoneri	PTS	10	Apr 20, 1933	Civic Auditorium, Grand Rapids, Michigan, US	
71	Draw	48–5–5 (13)	Steve Halaiko	MD	10	Apr 6, 1933	Convention Hall, Rochester, New York, US	
70	Win	48–5–4 (13)	Johnny Jadick	PTS	10	Mar 3, 1933	Grand Rapids, Michigan, US	
69	Win	47–5–4 (13)	Steve Halaiko	UD	10	Feb 2, 1933	Convention Hall, Rochester, New York, US	
68	Win	46–5–4 (13)	Eddie Ran	PTS	10	Jan 24, 1933	Olympia Stadium, Detroit, Michigan, US	
67	Win	45–5–4 (13)	Tony Herrera	PTS	10	Jan 12, 1933	Grand Rapids, Michigan, US	
66	Win	44–5–4 (13)	Battling Shaw	PTS	10	Jan 7, 1933	Arena Nacional, Mexico City, Mexico	
65	Loss	43–5–4 (13)	Manuel Villa I	PTS	10	Dec 10, 1932	Arena Nacional, Mexico City, Mexico	
64	Win	43–4–4 (13)	Tommy Grogan	PTS	10	Oct 26, 1932	Grand Rapids, Michigan, US	
63	Win	42–4–4 (13)	Herman Perlick	PTS	10	Oct 14, 1932	Grand Rapids, Michigan, US	
62	Win	41–4–4 (13)	Orrie Mosher	PTS	10	Sep 1, 1932	Grand Rapids, Michigan, US	
61	Win	40–4–4 (13)	Charley Raymond	PTS	10	Aug 11, 1932	Ebbets Field, New York City, New York, US	
60	Win	39–4–4 (13)	Jackie Pilkington	PTS	8	Jul 28, 1932	Queensboro Stadium, New York City, New York, US	
59	Win	38–4–4 (13)	Battling Gizzy	UD	10	Jul 18, 1932	Meyers Bowl, North Braddock, New Jersey, US	
58	Win	37–4–4 (13)	Joey Haas	KO	2 (10)	Jul 15, 1932	Coney Island Stadium, New York City, New York, US	
57	Loss	36–4–4 (13)	Orrie Mosher	PTS	10	Jun 20, 1932	Marsh Field, Muskegon, Michigan, US	
56	Win	36–3–4 (13)	Santiago Zorrilla	PTS	10	May 27, 1932	Grand Rapids, Michigan, US	
55	Win	35–3–4 (13)	Ray Miller	PTS	10	May 13, 1932	Olympia Stadium, Detroit, Michigan, US	
54	Win	34–3–4 (13)	Battling Gizzy	PTS	10	Mar 31, 1932	Olympia Stadium, Detroit, Michigan, US	
53	Win	33–3–4 (13)	Benny Bass	UD	10	Mar 9, 1932	Coliseum, Saint Louis, Missouri, US	
52	Win	32–3–4 (13)	Lou Terry	PTS	10	Feb 24, 1932	Coliseum, Saint Louis, Missouri, US	
51	Win	31–3–4 (13)	Jackie Elverrillo	PTS	10	Feb 19, 1932	Olympia Stadium, Detroit, Michigan, US	
50	Draw	30–3–4 (13)	Orrie Mosher	PTS	10	Feb 9, 1932	Armory, Muskegon, Michigan, US	
49	Win	30–3–3 (13)	Steve Halaiko	PTS	10	Jan 29, 1932	Grand Rapids, Michigan, US	
48	Win	29–3–3 (13)	Pat Igo	PTS	10	Jan 11, 1932	Armory, Grand Rapids, Michigan, US	
47	Draw	28–3–3 (13)	Eddie Cool	PTS	10	Dec 25, 1931	Arena, Philadelphia, Pennsylvania, US	
46	Loss	28–3–2 (13)	Pat Igo	KO	3 (10), 0:54	Dec 14, 1931	Arena, Philadelphia, Pennsylvania, US	
45	Win	28–2–2 (13)	Ralph Lenny	PTS	10	Nov 12, 1931	Coliseum, Grand Rapids, Michigan, US	
44	Win	27–2–2 (13)	Tex Takala	PTS	10	Oct 31, 1931	Opera House, Traverse City, Michigan, US	
43	Win	26–2–2 (13)	Frankie O'Farrell	KO	2 (?)	Oct 22, 1931	Muskegon, Michigan, US	
42	Win	25–2–2 (13)	Ervin Berlier	PTS	10	Sep 15, 1931	Coliseum Arena, New Orleans, Louisiana, US	
41	Win	24–2–2 (13)	Lou Saunders	TKO	8 (10)	Jul 14, 1931	Grand Rapids, Michigan, US	Won USA Michigan State lightweight title
40	Win	23–2–2 (13)	Johnny Jadick	PTS	8	May 25, 1931	Chicago Stadium, Chicago, Illinois, US	
39	Win	22–2–2 (13)	Sammy Dorfman	PTS	10	May 15, 1931	Grand Rapids, Michigan, US	
38	Win	21–2–2 (13)	Maxie Strub	PTS	10	Apr 15, 1931	Grand Rapids, Michigan, US	
37	Win	20–2–2 (13)	Herman Perlick	PTS	10	Mar 26, 1931	Armory, Kalamazoo, Michigan, US	
36	Win	19–2–2 (13)	Harry Dublinsky	PTS	10	Feb 18, 1931	Grand Rapids, Michigan, US	
35	Draw	18–2–2 (13)	Maxie Strub	PTS	10	Feb 6, 1931	Carney Auditorium, Erie, Pennsylvania, US	
34	Loss	18–2–1 (13)	Steve Halaiko	UD	10	Jan 1, 1931	Convention Hall, Rochester, New York, US	
33	Win	18–1–1 (13)	Steve Halaiko	MD	10	Dec 15, 1930	Convention Hall, Rochester, New York, US	
32	Win	17–1–1 (13)	Sammy Hackett	PTS	6	Dec 8, 1930	Convention Hall, Rochester, New York, US	
31	Win	16–1–1 (13)	Ray Collins	PTS	6	Dec 5, 1930	Carney Auditorium, Erie, Pennsylvania, US	
30	Win	15–1–1 (13)	Johnny Bedini	PTS	6	Dec 1, 1930	Convention Hall, Rochester, New York, US	
29	Win	14–1–1 (13)	Ritchie Mack	NWS	10	Oct 27, 1930	Coliseum, Des Moines, Iowa, US	
28	Win	14–1–1 (12)	Johnny Bedini	PTS	6	Oct 10, 1930	Broadway Auditorium, Buffalo, New York, US	
27	Win	13–1–1 (12)	Cowboy Eddie Anderson	DQ	8 (10)	Aug 29, 1930	Armory, Grand Rapids, Michigan, US	
26	Win	12–1–1 (12)	Harry Dublinsky	PTS	10	Jul 30, 1930	Island Park, Grand Rapids, Michigan, US	
25	Draw	11–1–1 (12)	Alex Miller	PTS	8	Jul 10, 1930	Kalamazoo, Michigan, US	
24	Win	11–1 (12)	Benny Duke	PTS	8	Jun 30, 1930	Olympic A.C., Grand Rapids, Michigan, US	
23	Win	10–1 (12)	Dick Landeg	PTS	8	Jun 17, 1930	Prudden Auditorium, Lansing, Michigan, US	
22	Win	9–1 (12)	Lester Smith	PTS	8	Jun 2, 1930	Ramona Baseball Park, Grand Rapids, Michigan, US	
21	Win	8–1 (12)	Tony Facelli	PTS	6	May 23, 1930	Olympic A.C., Grand Rapids, Michigan, US	
20	Win	7–1 (12)	Tony Facelli	PTS	4	May 9, 1930	Olympia Stadium, Detroit, Michigan, US	
19	Win	6–1 (12)	Marty Stone	NWS	6	Apr 30, 1930	Armory, Grand Rapids, Michigan, US	
18	Win	6–1 (11)	Alex Miller	NWS	6	Apr 11, 1930	Armory, Grand Rapids, Michigan, US	
17	Win	6–1 (10)	Mickey Genaro	PTS	10	Mar 29, 1930	Iron Mountain, Michigan, US	
16	Win	5–1 (10)	Johnny Conley	NWS	6	Mar 12, 1930	Armory, Muskegon, Michigan, US	
15	Win	5–1 (9)	Gans McKay	NWS	6	Feb 28, 1930	Armory, Grand Rapids, Michigan, US	
14	Win	5–1 (8)	Charlie Crocker	PTS	10	Jan 27, 1930	Iron Mountain, Michigan, US	
13	Win	4–1 (8)	Nelson Cobb	NWS	6	Jan 9, 1930	Armory, Grand Rapids, Michigan, US	
12	Win	4–1 (7)	Harry LaBarre	PTS	8	Dec 23, 1929	Janesville, Wisconsin, US	
11	Draw	3–1 (7)	Chester Karsten	NWS	6	Dec 13, 1929	Grand Rapids, Michigan, US	
10	Loss	3–1 (6)	Joey Freeman	PTS	4	Nov 27, 1929	Armory, Grand Rapids, Michigan, US	
9	Win	3–0 (6)	Jack Bresnan	KO	1 (4)	Nov 25, 1929	Kansas City, Missouri, US	
8	Win	2–0 (6)	Harry Barton	PTS	3	Nov 22, 1929	Location unknown	
7	Win	1–0 (6)	Joey Freeman	PTS	4	Nov 21, 1929	Armory, Grand Rapids, Michigan, US	
6	Win	0–0 (6)	Bruce McMyler	NWS	6	Nov 8, 1929	Prudden Auditorium, Lansing, Michigan, US	
5	Win	0–0 (5)	Verne Rogers	NWS	6	Oct 30, 1929	Armory, Grand Rapids, Michigan, US	
4	Win	0–0 (4)	Freddie Beal	NWS	6	Oct 22, 1929	Prudden Auditorium, Lansing, Michigan, US	
3	Win	0–0 (3)	Battling Delgado	NWS	6	Sep 13, 1929	Armory, Grand Rapids, Michigan, US	
2	Draw	0–0 (2)	Billy Kochneff	NWS	6	Aug 26, 1929	Marsh Field, Muskegon, Michigan, US	
1	Win	0–0 (1)	Packy McFarland	NWS	6	Aug 14, 1929	Island Park, Grand Rapids, Michigan, US	

=== Unofficial record ===
192 fights	150 wins	28 losses
By knockout	11	4
By decision	138	23
By disqualification	1	1
Draws	14	

Record with the inclusion of newspaper decisions in the win/loss/draw column.

No.	Result	Record	Opponent	Type	Round	Date	Location	Notes
194	Win	152–28–14	Maurice Arnault	PTS	10	Jun 20, 1941	Civic Auditorium, Grand Rapids, Michigan, US	
193	Loss	151–28–14	Billy Beauhuld	PTS	8	Sep 23, 1940	Meadowbrook Bowl, Newark, New Jersey, US	
192	Win	151–27–14	Nunzio Bisogno	PTS	10	Jul 22, 1940	Meadowbrook Bowl, Newark, New Jersey, US	
191	Loss	150–27–14	Dave Castilloux	PTS	8	Apr 23, 1940	New York Coliseum, New York City, New York, US	
190	Win	150–26–14	Paul DeBello	UD	10	Apr 11, 1940	Civic Auditorium, Grand Rapids, Michigan, US	
189	Loss	149–26–14	Paul DeBello	PTS	8	Mar 2, 1940	Ridgewood Grove, New York City, New York, US	
188	Win	149–25–14	Johnny Rinaldi	PTS	8	Feb 20, 1940	New York Coliseum, New York City, New York, US	
187	Win	148–25–14	Mike Gamiere	UD	10	Jan 18, 1940	Civic Auditorium, Grand Rapids, Michigan, US	
186	Loss	147–25–14	Mike Gamiere	PTS	10	Jan 5, 1940	Public Hall, Cleveland, Ohio, US	
185	Loss	147–24–14	Maxie Berger	PTS	8	Dec 12, 1939	New York Coliseum, New York City, New York, US	
184	Win	147–23–14	Wishy Jones	PTS	10	Oct 16, 1939	Eagles Club, Milwaukee, Wisconsin, US	
183	Win	146–23–14	Joe Boscarino	UD	10	Sep 7, 1939	Sportatorium, Dallas, Texas, US	
182	Draw	145–23–14	Paul DeBello	PTS	8	Aug 16, 1939	Airport Stadium, Rochester, New York, US	
181	Win	145–23–13	Armando Sicilia	PTS	10	Aug 4, 1939	Federation Park, Port Huron, Michigan, US	
180	Loss	144–23–13	Maxie Berger	UD	10	Jul 5, 1939	Forum, Montreal, Quebec, Canada	For vacant world junior welterweight title (Montreal version)
179	Win	144–22–13	Leonard Del Genio	PTS	10	Jun 13, 1939	Grand Rapids, Michigan, US	
178	Win	143–22–13	Emil Joseph	UD	10	May 22, 1939	Hickey Park, Millvale, Pennsylvania, US	
177	Win	142–22–13	Billy Hardges	PTS	8	Apr 19, 1939	Futuristic Ballroom, Milwaukee, Wisconsin, US	
176	Win	141–22–13	Maxie Berger	PTS	10	Mar 28, 1939	New York Coliseum, New York City, New York, US	
175	Win	140–22–13	Wishy Jones	PTS	10	Mar 14, 1939	Grand Rapids, Michigan, US	
174	Win	139–22–13	Maxie Berger	PTS	8	Feb 21, 1939	New York Coliseum, New York City, New York, US	
173	Win	138–22–13	Emil Joseph	UD	10	Jan 31, 1939	Motor Square Garden, Pittsburgh, Pennsylvania, US	
172	Win	137–22–13	Joe Boscarino	PTS	10	Jan 19, 1939	Grand Rapids, Michigan, US	
171	Loss	136–22–13	Joe Boscarino	KO	5 (10), 1:24	Jan 3, 1939	Convention Hall, Rochester, New York, US	
170	Win	136–21–13	Russell Brock	PTS	10	Dec 29, 1938	Sportatorium, Dallas, Texas, US	
169	Win	135–21–13	Lew Jenkins	PTS	10	Dec 16, 1938	Sportatorium, Dallas, Texas, US	Won USA Texas State lightweight title
168	Win	134–21–13	Paul DeBello	PTS	8	Oct 29, 1938	Ridgewood Grove, New York City, New York, US	
167	Win	133–21–13	Harry Weekly	PTS	10	Oct 6, 1938	Sportatorium, Dallas, Texas, US	
166	Loss	132–21–13	Sammy Angott	UD	10	Sep 16, 1938	Sportatorium, Dallas, Texas, US	
165	Win	132–20–13	Chino Alvarez	PTS	10	Sep 1, 1938	Municipal Stadium, Savannah, Georgia, US	
164	Win	131–20–13	Eddie Brink	PTS	10	Aug 11, 1938	Grand Rapids, Michigan, US	
163	Win	130–20–13	Leo Rodak	UD	10	Jul 8, 1938	Sportatorium, Dallas, Texas, US	
162	Loss	129–20–13	Wishy Jones	PTS	10	Jun 28, 1938	Olympiad Arena, Houston, Texas, US	
161	Win	129–19–13	Chino Alvarez	MD	10	Jun 24, 1938	Sportatorium, Dallas, Texas, US	
160	Win	128–19–13	Al Manriquez	PTS	10	Jun 10, 1938	Sportatorium, Dallas, Texas, US	
159	Win	127–19–13	Bobby Britton	MD	10	Jun 3, 1938	Sportatorium, Dallas, Texas, US	
158	Win	126–19–13	Johnny Durso	PTS	10	May 24, 1938	Armory, Muskegon, Michigan, US	
157	Loss	125–19–13	Sammy Angott	UD	10	May 6, 1938	Jefferson County Armory, Louisville, Kentucky, US	
156	Win	125–18–13	Lew Jenkins	PTS	10	Apr 28, 1938	Sportatorium, Dallas, Texas, US	
155	Win	124–18–13	Bobby McIntire	PTS	10	Apr 21, 1938	Armory, Muskegon, Michigan, US	
154	Win	123–18–13	Joey Greb	PTS	10	Apr 11, 1938	Grand Rapids, Michigan, US	
153	Win	122–18–13	Jimmy Buckler	PTS	10	Apr 1, 1938	Studebaker Clubrooms, South Bend, Indiana, US	
152	Win	121–18–13	Russell Hayes	TKO	7 (10)	Mar 24, 1938	Armory, Muskegon, Michigan, US	
151	Win	120–18–13	Jimmy Buckler	PTS	10	Mar 8, 1938	Armory, Muskegon, Michigan, US	
150	Win	119–18–13	Eddie McGeever	PTS	8	Feb 15, 1938	New York Coliseum, New York City, New York, US	
149	Win	118–18–13	Wesley Farrell	PTS	6	Jan 12, 1938	Madison Square Garden, New York City, New York, US	
148	Win	117–18–13	Pete Caracciola	PTS	8	Dec 21, 1937	New York Coliseum, New York City, New York, US	
147	Win	116–18–13	Charlie Baxter	KO	3 (10)	Dec 10, 1937	Grand Rapids, Michigan, US	
146	Win	115–18–13	Jimmy Vaughn	PTS	10	Nov 15, 1937	Columbia Gymnasium Arena, Louisville, Kentucky, US	
145	Win	114–18–13	Joey Alcanter	TKO	7 (10)	Sep 17, 1937	Legion Stadium, Hollywood, California, US	
144	Loss	113–18–13	Pedro Montañez	KO	1 (10), 2:40	Jul 26, 1937	Gilmore Stadium, Los Angeles, California, US	
143	Win	113–17–13	Hubert 'Kid' Dennis	MD	10	Jun 7, 1937	Broadway Theater, Butte, Montana, US	
142	Win	112–17–13	Charley Gomer	PTS	8	May 24, 1937	Dexter Park Arena, New York City, New York, US	
141	Win	111–17–13	Jimmy Vaughn	PTS	10	May 10, 1937	Broadway Theater, Butte, Montana, US	
140	Win	110–17–13	Jimmy Buckler	PTS	10	May 4, 1937	Armory, Benton Harbor, Michigan, US	
139	Win	109–17–13	Dominic Mancini	PTS	10	Mar 15, 1937	Columbia Gymnasium Arena, Louisville, Kentucky, US	
138	Win	108–17–13	Carl Guggino	PTS	10	Mar 10, 1937	Civic Auditorium, Grand Rapids, Michigan, US	
137	Loss	107–17–13	Carl Guggino	PTS	6	Feb 26, 1937	Madison Square Garden, New York City, New York, US	
136	Win	107–16–13	Tommy Rawson Jr.	UD	10	Feb 4, 1937	Eagleston Square Stadium, Boston, Massachusetts, US	
135	Win	106–16–13	Johnny Jadick	UD	10	Jan 22, 1937	Arena, Syracuse, New York, US	
134	Win	105–16–13	Rafael Hurtado	PTS	10	Dec 7, 1936	Civic Auditorium, Grand Rapids, Michigan, US	
133	Win	104–16–13	Tony Petroskey	PTS	10	Nov 20, 1936	Armory, Muskegon, Michigan, US	
132	Win	103–16–13	Joe Doty	PTS	10	Nov 9, 1936	Armory, Kalamazoo, Michigan, US	
131	Win	102–16–13	Frankie Wallace	PTS	10	Oct 9, 1936	Civic Auditorium, Grand Rapids, Michigan, US	
130	Win	101–16–13	Speedy Johnson	PTS	10	Sep 29, 1936	Arena Gardens, Detroit, Michigan, US	
129	Win	100–16–13	Johnny Green	PTS	6	Sep 22, 1936	Kalamazoo, Michigan, US	
128	Draw	99–16–13	Rafael Hurtado	PTS	10	Jul 22, 1936	Ebbets Field, New York City, New York, US	
127	Win	99–16–12	Joey Zodda	KO	5 (10)	Jul 15, 1936	Grand Rapids, Michigan, US	
126	Win	98–16–12	Jimmy Garrison	SD	10	Jun 24, 1936	Municipal Auditorium, Kansas City, Missouri, US	
125	Draw	97–16–12	Joey Zodda	PTS	8	Jun 2, 1936	Braddock Bowl, Jersey City, New Jersey, US	
124	Win	97–16–11	Mickey Genaro	PTS	10	May 19, 1936	The Mart, Muskegon, Michigan, US	
123	Draw	96–16–11	Eddie Zivic	PTS	10	May 5, 1936	Civic Auditorium, Grand Rapids, Michigan, US	
122	Loss	96–16–10	Leonard Del Genio	SD	10	Mar 30, 1936	St. Nicholas Arena, New York City, New York, US	
121	Win	96–15–10	Bobby Pacho	PTS	10	Mar 4, 1936	Civic Auditorium, Grand Rapids, Michigan, US	
120	Win	95–15–10	Tony Falco	UD	10	Feb 18, 1936	Broadway Arena, New York City, New York, US	
119	Win	94–15–10	Frankie Williams	PTS	8	Feb 10, 1936	Laurel Garden, Newark, New Jersey, US	
118	Win	93–15–10	Johnny Lucas	PTS	10	Feb 6, 1936	Olympia A.C., Philadelphia, Pennsylvania, US	
117	Win	92–15–10	Eddie Cool	UD	10	Jan 28, 1936	Broadway Arena, New York City, New York, US	
116	Draw	91–15–10	Bobby Pacho	PTS	10	Nov 8, 1935	Civic Auditorium, Grand Rapids, Michigan, US	
115	Win	91–15–9	Bobby Pacho	PTS	10	Oct 11, 1935	Civic Auditorium, Grand Rapids, Michigan, US	
114	Win	90–15–9	Steve Halaiko	PTS	6	Oct 4, 1935	Madison Square Garden, New York City, New York, US	
113	Win	89–15–9	Chuck Woods	PTS	10	Sep 13, 1935	Civic Auditorium, Grand Rapids, Michigan, US	
112	Win	88–15–9	Jackie Kelly	TKO	8 (10)	Sep 5, 1935	Veterans' of Foreign Wars Arena, Lansing, Michigan, US	
111	Win	87–15–9	Bucky Keyes	PTS	10	Aug 1, 1935	Fort Hamilton Arena, New York City, New York, US	
110	Win	86–15–9	Joey Costa	PTS	10	Jul 18, 1935	Fort Hamilton Arena, New York City, New York, US	
109	Win	85–15–9	Tiger 'Kid' Walker	KO	10 (10)	Jul 10, 1935	Civic Auditorium, Grand Rapids, Michigan, US	
108	Win	84–15–9	Tiger 'Kid' Walker	PTS	10	Jun 21, 1935	Arena Gardens Bowl, Detroit, Michigan, US	
107	Win	83–15–9	Leo Rodak	PTS	12	Jun 13, 1935	Mills Stadium, Chicago, Illinois, US	
106	Win	82–15–9	Steve Halaiko	PTS	10	May 15, 1935	Heinemann Park, New Orleans, Louisiana, US	
105	Win	81–15–9	Roger Bernard	PTS	10	Apr 10, 1935	Civic Auditorium, Grand Rapids, Michigan, US	
104	Loss	80–15–9	Maxie Strub	PTS	10	Apr 5, 1935	Carney Auditorium, Erie, Pennsylvania, US	
103	Win	80–14–9	Frankie Sagilio	PTS	10	Mar 15, 1935	Chicago Stadium, Chicago, Illinois, US	
102	Win	79–14–9	Jimmy Vaughn	PTS	10	Feb 26, 1935	Olympia Stadium, Detroit, Michigan, US	
101	Win	78–14–9	Tommy John	KO	2 (10)	Jan 27, 1935	The Ring, London, England, UK	
100	Loss	77–14–9	Jimmy Walsh	DQ	6 (10)	Jan 21, 1935	Royal Albert Hall, London, England, UK	
99	Win	77–13–9	Harry Brooks	PTS	12	Dec 30, 1934	The Ring, London, England, UK	
98	Win	76–13–9	Boyo Rees	PTS	12	Dec 13, 1934	The Stadium, Liverpool, Merseyside, England, UK	
97	Loss	75–13–9	Jackie Flynn	PTS	12	Nov 5, 1934	City Hall, Cape Town, South Africa	
96	Win	75–12–9	Louis Botes	PTS	10	Oct 6, 1934	Town Hall, Durban, South Africa	
95	Loss	74–12–9	Laurie Stevens	PTS	10	Sep 22, 1934	Wanderers Stadium, Johannesburg, South Africa	
94	Loss	74–11–9	Laurie Stevens	PTS	12	Aug 18, 1934	Wanderers Stadium, Johannesburg, South Africa	
93	Loss	74–10–9	Jack Carroll	TKO	10 (15), 0:50	May 14, 1934	Sydney Stadium, Sydney, Australia	
92	Win	74–9–9	Bobby Delaney	PTS	15	Mar 31, 1934	Sydney Stadium, Sydney, Australia	
91	Win	73–9–9	Jimmy Kelso	PTS	15	Mar 5, 1934	Sydney Stadium, Sydney, Australia	
90	Loss	72–9–9	Jack Portney	MD	10	Jan 1, 1934	Convention Hall, Rochester, New York, US	
89	Win	72–8–9	Johnny Stroppa	PTS	10	Dec 18, 1933	Grand Rapids, Michigan, US	
88	Win	71–8–9	Johnny Stroppa	PTS	10	Dec 1, 1933	Arena Gardens, Detroit, Michigan, US	
87	Win	70–8–9	Harry Dublinsky	PTS	10	Nov 23, 1933	Auditorium, Milwaukee, Wisconsin, US	
86	Win	69–8–9	Billy Hogan	UD	6	Nov 14, 1933	Ridgewood Grove, New York City, New York, US	
85	Win	68–8–9	Ray Bowen	PTS	10	Nov 7, 1933	Portner's Arena, Alexandria, Virginia, US	
84	Draw	67–8–9	Petey Gulotta	PTS	8	Nov 4, 1933	Ridgewood Grove, New York City, New York, US	
83	Win	67–8–8	Dick Sisk	PTS	10	Oct 23, 1933	Auditorium, Milwaukee, Wisconsin, US	
82	Loss	66–8–8	Tony Herrera	PTS	10	Oct 9, 1933	Grand Rapids, Michigan, US	
81	Win	66–7–8	Jackie Davis	PTS	10	Sep 26, 1933	Coliseum, Cleveland, Ohio, US	
80	Win	65–7–8	Herbert Lewis Hardwick	UD	10	Aug 31, 1933	Heywood Arena, West Springfield, Massachusetts, US	
79	Loss	64–7–8	Steve Halaiko	SD	10	Aug 7, 1933	Heywood Arena, West Springfield, Massachusetts, US	
78	Draw	64–6–8	Jimmy Leto	PTS	10	Jul 26, 1933	South Park Arena, Hartford, Connecticut, US	
77	Win	64–6–7	Jimmy Slavin	PTS	5	Jul 12, 1933	Polo Grounds, New York City, New York, US	
76	Loss	63–6–7	Tony Herrera	PTS	10	Jun 16, 1933	Grand Rapids, Michigan, US	
75	Win	63–5–7	Harry Dublinsky	MD	10	May 19, 1933	Northside Arena, Pittsburgh, Pennsylvania, US	
74	Win	62–5–7	Roger Bernard	PTS	10	May 8, 1933	I.M.A. Auditorium, Flint, Michigan, US	
73	Win	61–5–7	Tony Sciolino	PTS	10	May 1, 1933	Broadway Auditorium, Buffalo, New York, US	
72	Win	60–5–7	Tony Canzoneri	PTS	10	Apr 20, 1933	Civic Auditorium, Grand Rapids, Michigan, US	
71	Draw	59–5–7	Steve Halaiko	MD	10	Apr 6, 1933	Convention Hall, Rochester, New York, US	
70	Win	59–5–6	Johnny Jadick	PTS	10	Mar 3, 1933	Grand Rapids, Michigan, US	
69	Win	58–5–6	Steve Halaiko	UD	10	Feb 2, 1933	Convention Hall, Rochester, New York, US	
68	Win	57–5–6	Eddie Ran	PTS	10	Jan 24, 1933	Olympia Stadium, Detroit, Michigan, US	
67	Win	56–5–6	Tony Herrera	PTS	10	Jan 12, 1933	Grand Rapids, Michigan, US	
66	Win	55–5–6	Battling Shaw	PTS	10	Jan 7, 1933	Arena Nacional, Mexico City, Mexico	
65	Loss	54–5–6	Manuel Villa I	PTS	10	Dec 10, 1932	Arena Nacional, Mexico City, Mexico	
64	Win	54–4–6	Tommy Grogan	PTS	10	Oct 26, 1932	Grand Rapids, Michigan, US	
63	Win	53–4–6	Herman Perlick	PTS	10	Oct 14, 1932	Grand Rapids, Michigan, US	
62	Win	52–4–6	Orrie Mosher	PTS	10	Sep 1, 1932	Grand Rapids, Michigan, US	
61	Win	51–4–6	Charley Raymond	PTS	10	Aug 11, 1932	Ebbets Field, New York City, New York, US	
60	Win	50–4–6	Jackie Pilkington	PTS	8	Jul 28, 1932	Queensboro Stadium, New York City, New York, US	
59	Win	49–4–6	Battling Gizzy	UD	10	Jul 18, 1932	Meyers Bowl, North Braddock, New Jersey, US	
58	Win	48–4–6	Joey Haas	KO	2 (10)	Jul 15, 1932	Coney Island Stadium, New York City, New York, US	
57	Loss	47–4–6	Orrie Mosher	PTS	10	Jun 20, 1932	Marsh Field, Muskegon, Michigan, US	
56	Win	47–3–6	Santiago Zorrilla	PTS	10	May 27, 1932	Grand Rapids, Michigan, US	
55	Win	46–3–6	Ray Miller	PTS	10	May 13, 1932	Olympia Stadium, Detroit, Michigan, US	
54	Win	45–3–6	Battling Gizzy	PTS	10	Mar 31, 1932	Olympia Stadium, Detroit, Michigan, US	
53	Win	44–3–6	Benny Bass	UD	10	Mar 9, 1932	Coliseum, Saint Louis, Missouri, US	
52	Win	43–3–6	Lou Terry	PTS	10	Feb 24, 1932	Coliseum, Saint Louis, Missouri, US	
51	Win	42–3–6	Jackie Elverrillo	PTS	10	Feb 19, 1932	Olympia Stadium, Detroit, Michigan, US	
50	Draw	41–3–6	Orrie Mosher	PTS	10	Feb 9, 1932	Armory, Muskegon, Michigan, US	
49	Win	41–3–5	Steve Halaiko	PTS	10	Jan 29, 1932	Grand Rapids, Michigan, US	
48	Win	40–3–5	Pat Igo	PTS	10	Jan 11, 1932	Armory, Grand Rapids, Michigan, US	
47	Draw	39–3–5	Eddie Cool	PTS	10	Dec 25, 1931	Arena, Philadelphia, Pennsylvania, US	
46	Loss	39–3–4	Pat Igo	KO	3 (10), 0:54	Dec 14, 1931	Arena, Philadelphia, Pennsylvania, US	
45	Win	39–2–4	Ralph Lenny	PTS	10	Nov 12, 1931	Coliseum, Grand Rapids, Michigan, US	
44	Win	38–2–4	Tex Takala	PTS	10	Oct 31, 1931	Opera House, Traverse City, Michigan, US	
43	Win	37–2–4	Frankie O'Farrell	KO	2 (?)	Oct 22, 1931	Muskegon, Michigan, US	
42	Win	36–2–4	Ervin Berlier	PTS	10	Sep 15, 1931	Coliseum Arena, New Orleans, Louisiana, US	
41	Win	35–2–4	Lou Saunders	TKO	8 (10)	Jul 14, 1931	Grand Rapids, Michigan, US	Won USA Michigan State lightweight title
40	Win	34–2–4	Johnny Jadick	PTS	8	May 25, 1931	Chicago Stadium, Chicago, Illinois, US	
39	Win	33–2–4	Sammy Dorfman	PTS	10	May 15, 1931	Grand Rapids, Michigan, US	
38	Win	32–2–4	Maxie Strub	PTS	10	Apr 15, 1931	Grand Rapids, Michigan, US	
37	Win	31–2–4	Herman Perlick	PTS	10	Mar 26, 1931	Armory, Kalamazoo, Michigan, US	
36	Win	30–2–4	Harry Dublinsky	PTS	10	Feb 18, 1931	Grand Rapids, Michigan, US	
35	Draw	29–2–4	Maxie Strub	PTS	10	Feb 6, 1931	Carney Auditorium, Erie, Pennsylvania, US	
34	Loss	29–2–3	Steve Halaiko	UD	10	Jan 1, 1931	Convention Hall, Rochester, New York, US	
33	Win	29–1–3	Steve Halaiko	MD	10	Dec 15, 1930	Convention Hall, Rochester, New York, US	
32	Win	28–1–3	Sammy Hackett	PTS	6	Dec 8, 1930	Convention Hall, Rochester, New York, US	
31	Win	27–1–3	Ray Collins	PTS	6	Dec 5, 1930	Carney Auditorium, Erie, Pennsylvania, US	
30	Win	26–1–3	Johnny Bedini	PTS	6	Dec 1, 1930	Convention Hall, Rochester, New York, US	
29	Win	25–1–3	Ritchie Mack	NWS	10	Oct 27, 1930	Coliseum, Des Moines, Iowa, US	
28	Win	24–1–3	Johnny Bedini	PTS	6	Oct 10, 1930	Broadway Auditorium, Buffalo, New York, US	
27	Win	23–1–3	Cowboy Eddie Anderson	DQ	8 (10)	Aug 29, 1930	Armory, Grand Rapids, Michigan, US	
26	Win	22–1–3	Harry Dublinsky	PTS	10	Jul 30, 1930	Island Park, Grand Rapids, Michigan, US	
25	Draw	21–1–3	Alex Miller	PTS	8	Jul 10, 1930	Kalamazoo, Michigan, US	
24	Win	21–1–2	Benny Duke	PTS	8	Jun 30, 1930	Olympic A.C., Grand Rapids, Michigan, US	
23	Win	20–1–2	Dick Landeg	PTS	8	Jun 17, 1930	Prudden Auditorium, Lansing, Michigan, US	
22	Win	19–1–2	Lester Smith	PTS	8	Jun 2, 1930	Ramona Baseball Park, Grand Rapids, Michigan, US	
21	Win	18–1–2	Tony Facelli	PTS	6	May 23, 1930	Olympic A.C., Grand Rapids, Michigan, US	
20	Win	17–1–2	Tony Facelli	PTS	4	May 9, 1930	Olympia Stadium, Detroit, Michigan, US	
19	Win	16–1–2	Marty Stone	NWS	6	Apr 30, 1930	Armory, Grand Rapids, Michigan, US	
18	Win	15–1–2	Alex Miller	NWS	6	Apr 11, 1930	Armory, Grand Rapids, Michigan, US	
17	Win	14–1–2	Mickey Genaro	PTS	10	Mar 29, 1930	Iron Mountain, Michigan, US	
16	Win	13–1–2	Johnny Conley	NWS	6	Mar 12, 1930	Armory, Muskegon, Michigan, US	
15	Win	12–1–2	Gans McKay	NWS	6	Feb 28, 1930	Armory, Grand Rapids, Michigan, US	
14	Win	11–1–2	Charlie Crocker	PTS	10	Jan 27, 1930	Iron Mountain, Michigan, US	
13	Win	10–1–2	Nelson Cobb	NWS	6	Jan 9, 1930	Armory, Grand Rapids, Michigan, US	
12	Win	9–1–2	Harry LaBarre	PTS	8	Dec 23, 1929	Janesville, Wisconsin, US	
11	Draw	8–1–2	Chester Karsten	NWS	6	Dec 13, 1929	Grand Rapids, Michigan, US	
10	Loss	8–1–1	Joey Freeman	PTS	4	Nov 27, 1929	Armory, Grand Rapids, Michigan, US	
9	Win	8–0–1	Jack Bresnan	KO	1 (4)	Nov 25, 1929	Kansas City, Missouri, US	
8	Win	7–0–1	Harry Barton	PTS	3	Nov 22, 1929	Location unknown	
7	Win	6–0–1	Joey Freeman	PTS	4	Nov 21, 1929	Armory, Grand Rapids, Michigan, US	
6	Win	5–0–1	Bruce McMyler	NWS	6	Nov 8, 1929	Prudden Auditorium, Lansing, Michigan, US	
5	Win	4–0–1	Verne Rogers	NWS	6	Oct 30, 1929	Armory, Grand Rapids, Michigan, US	
4	Win	3–0–1	Freddie Beal	NWS	6	Oct 22, 1929	Prudden Auditorium, Lansing, Michigan, US	
3	Win	2–0–1	Battling Delgado	NWS	6	Sep 13, 1929	Armory, Grand Rapids, Michigan, US	
2	Draw	1–0–1	Billy Kochneff	NWS	6	Aug 26, 1929	Marsh Field, Muskegon, Michigan, US	
1	Win	1–0	Packy McFarland	NWS	6	Aug 14, 1929	Island Park, Grand Rapids, Michigan, US	
