= Tony Morgano =

American boxer

Personal information
- Nationality: American
- Born: August 19, 1913 Philadelphia, Pennsylvania
- Died: February 2, 1985 (aged 71)
- Height: 5 ft 5 in (1.65 m)
- Weight: 135 lb (61 kg)

Boxing career
- Stance: Southpaw

Boxing record
- Wins: At Least 55
- Win by KO: 25
- Losses: 11
- Draws: 5

Tony Morgano (August 19, 1913 – February 2, 1984) was an American professional boxer, iron worker, politician and boxing trainer'

During the 1930s Morgano was a left-handed professional boxer who defeated Freddie Miller, Baby Arizmendi, Tommy Paul, Lew Feldman, and Johnny Jadick in non-title fights.

After his retirement from boxing, Morgano worked as an iron worker. He later served as a Republican committeeman in the Ninth Division of the 26th Ward of Philadelphia.

Morgano provided training to approximately 1,250 young boxers, and assisted many retired fighters

== Early years ==
Morgano was born and raised in Philadelphia on Montrose Street, to Paul and Concetta Morgano. Morgano had four brothers - Robert, Paul, Sam, and Edward and two sisters - Anne and Grace. His father Paul was an immigrant painter who died when he was five.

Morgano started working after finishing the third grad. He spent his leisure time watching boxers train at the Olympic gym at Broad and Bainbridge streets.

== Amateur career ==
When Morgano started boxing at age 12, he only weighed 88 pounds. According to the rules, all boxers had to weigh at least 100 lbs. In response, Morgano would fill his shoes with lead weights so that he could weigh in at 105 lbs.

In his first year, Morgano won the Middle Atlantic AAU flyweight title. In the next three years, he won 21 fights. Whenever Morgano won a bout, he was awarded a Walton watch.

In order to help his mother support his family, he would then sell the watch to someone at ringside for $2 or $3 and bring the money home to his mother.

Morgano went undefeated as an amateur defeating 22 fighters.

== Professional career ==
Still a teenager, Morgano's professional career started when a promoter in Camden, New Jersey offered him $25 to be a stand-in boxer against Pee Wee Ross, an experienced fighter. On January 15, 1929, Morgano defeated Ross. He kept $5 and gave $20 to his mother. Telegraphs revealed that much of his prize money in later fights would be sent home.

When it became known that Morgano had fought for pay, his amateur days were done. At 15, he signed a contract with Max "Boo Boo" Hoff, a local promoter. Prior to going with Hoff, Morgano was managed by Vincent "Jimmy" Barbieri who at the age of 102 told stories of "his boy" Tony.

Morgano boxed in the Philadelphia area until the age of 21, accumulating approximately 51 victories. He then teamed up with Frankie Caris, a middleweight, and traveled the nation boxing. While in California, Morgano became popular with many Hollywood celebrities. He defeated Georgie Hansford, Tommy Paul, and Lew Feldman taking 9 out of 10 rounds on April 5, 1935. His only loss was against Jimmy Christy. In a later rematch, the two boxer had a draw.

In 1935 Morgano participated in Gold Diggers of 1935, a film with Mae West, and a Western.

Upon his return to Philadelphia, Morgano won 13 fights and lost one (to Billy Maher). Morgano had entered the Maher fight with two broken ribs and a fractured ankle. Morgano then defeated Tommy Speigal on September 27, 1940, for lightweight title. However, because Morgano had come into the fight overweight, he was stripped of the title. Later in 1940, Morgano retired from boxing because of a shattered hand.

Morgano finished his boxing career with 55 victories, 11 defeats and at 25 kos.

== After Boxing ==
During World War II, Morgano worked as a welder at the New York Shipyard in Camden. After the war he became an ironworker and worked on several major projects. He married a young woman by the name of Patricia and had three sons, Kevin, Tony and Michael.

Morgano became active in Republican Party politics serving as a committeeman in the Ninth Division of the 26th Ward. He ran unsuccessfully for the Philadelphia City Council and for the Pennsylvania General Assembly.

Morgano worked in South Philadelphia, with young boxers at the Police Athletic League and the Southside Boys club. Ge trained some 1,250 boxers over 30 years. His Southside Boys club competed for and won on several occasions the Pennsylvania Golden Gloves tournament.

Morgano served as longtime president of the Veteran's Boxing Association, and worked to better the lives of many ex boxers. Often staging events to support them.

== Professional Record ==
Below represents a partial list of Morgano's professional bouts. Due to the incomplete record keeping of the time the list is unfinished and will be updated as more information becomes available.

Result	Opponent	Type	Date	Location	Notes
Loss	Aldo Spoldi	Decision	06-19-1941	Olympia A.C., Philadelphia, Pennsylvania, US	
Win	Buck Streator	Decision	05-08-1941	Olympia A.C., Philadelphia, Pennsylvania, US	
Win	Tommy Spiegal	Unanimous Decision	09-26-1940	Olympia A.C., Philadelphia, Pennsylvania, US	Was for title, Morgano would have been awarded had he not come in over weight
Loss	Billy Maher		05-24-1940	Metropolitan Opera House, Philadelphia, Pennsylvania, US	lost in 8th round, in a previous fight with Maher, Morgano lost in the 5th had Novocaine injections, had two broken ribs and fractured ankle from training
Win	Lew Feldman		04-11-1940	Olympia A.C., Philadelphia, Pennsylvania, US	
Win	Jimmy Lancaster		02-08-1940	Olympia A.C., Philadelphia, Pennsylvania, US	
Win	Lou Fortuna		01-18-1940	Olympia A.C., Philadelphia, Pennsylvania, US	
Win	Jackie Sheppard		12-25-1939	Olympia A.C., Philadelphia, Pennsylvania, US	
		Two year layoff			
Win	Johnny Dube		10-11-1937	Arena, Philadelphia, Pennsylvania, US	
Win	Snag Trowbridge		08-16-1937	Arena, Philadelphia, Pennsylvania, US	
Win	Young Raspi		08-02-1937	Philadelphia, Pennsylvania, US	
Win	Al Dunbar	TKO in 2nd	07-19-1937	Arena, Philadelphia, Pennsylvania, US	
Win	Freddie Cochrane		06-28-1937	Arena, Philadelphia, Pennsylvania, US	
Win	Bruce Flowers		03-13-1937	Arena, Philadelphia, Pennsylvania, US	Paper noted that Morgano easily defeated Flowers
Win	Dave Finn	Decision	10-28-1936	Arena, Philadelphia, Pennsylvania, US	
Loss	Lew Massey	10-01-1936	Decision	Olympia A.C., Philadelphia, Pennsylvania, US	
Win	Johnny Jadick	01-16-1936	Decision	Olympia A.C., Philadelphia, Pennsylvania, US	Defeated Former junior welterweight champion
Loss	Joey Ferrando	12-25-1935	Decision	Cambria A.C., Philadelphia, Pennsylvania, US	Morgano later went on to say this was the toughest fight of his career
Win	Jackie Willis	11-14-1935	TKO 4th round	Olympia A.C., Philadelphia, Pennsylvania, US	
Draw	Johnny Craven		10-04-1395	Philadelphia, Pennsylvania, US	
Loss	Eddie Cool		09-19-1935	Philadelphia, Pennsylvania, US	Also had a win and a draw against Cool Morgano told interviewers that Cool was the best fighter he ever competed against
Loss	Harry Serody	Decision	09-11-1935	Baker Bowl, Philadelphia, Pennsylvania, US	
Win	Lew Feldman	Unanimous Decision	04-05-1935	Legion Stadium, Hollywood, California, US	Morgano won 9 out of 10 rounds
Draw	Jimmy Christy		03-08-1935	Legion Stadium, Hollywood, California, US	
Loss	Jimmy Christy	Decision	02-08-1935	Legion Stadium, Hollywood, California, US	
Win	Tommy Paul		12-28-1934	Legion Stadium, Hollywood, California, US	Ex featherweight champion
Win	Georgie Hansford		11-16-1934	Legion Stadium, Hollywood, California, US	
Win	Georgie Gibs		1934	Philadelphia, Pennsylvania, US	Exact date unknown, victory mentioned in article in Philadelphia Inquirer
Win	Eddie Shea		04-09-1934	Arena, Philadelphia, Pennsylvania, US	
Win	Vincent Reed		02-22-1934	Philadelphia, Pennsylvania, US	
Win	Bobby Dean		01-18-1934	Broadway A.C., Philadelphia, Pennsylvania, IS	
Win	Harry Blitman	TKO	11-03-1932	Broadway A.C., Philadelphia, Pennsylvania, US	
Win	Tony Loftus	TKO	10-06-1932	Broadway A.C., Philadelphia, Pennsylvania, US	Loftus suffered a badly cut eye
Loss	Jackie Willis	TKO 7th round	03-03-1932	Broadway A.C., Philadelphia, Pennsylvania, US	Morgano suffered a badly cut right eye
Win	Midget Fox		02-08-1932	Atlantic City, New Jersey, US	
Win	Ernie Caesar	TKO 3rd	01-28-1932	Broadway A.C., Philadelphia, Pennsylvania, US	
Win	Jimmy Stewart		11-26-1931	Broadway A.C., Philadelphia, Pennsylvania, US	
Win	Jimmy Donato		11-16-1931	Laurel Garden, Newark, New Jersey, US	
Win	Timmy Murphy	KO in 52 seconds of 1st round	10-12-1931	Arena, Philadelphia, Pennsylvania, US	
Draw	Lew Lafferty		08-29-1931	Atlantic City Auditorium, Atlantic City, New Jersey, US	
Win	Georgia Goldberg	TKO 7th	08-14-1931	Atlantic City Auditorium, Atlantic City, New Jersey, US	
Win	Steve Smith	TKO 6th round	06-29-1931	Arena, Philadelphia, Pennsylvania, US	
Win	Young Johnny Brown	TKO 3rd	05-11-1931	Arena, Philadelphia, Pennsylvania, US	
Win	Lew Lafferty	Decision	04-2-1931	Arena, Philadelphia, Pennsylvania, US	
Win	Johnny Erickson	TKO 3rd round	04-13-1931	Arena, Philadelphia, Pennsylvania, US	
Win	Al Mason	KO 2nd	03-30-1931	Arena, Philadelphia, Pennsylvania, US	
Win	Billy Britton	TKO 4th round	02-23-1931	Arena, Philadelphia, Pennsylvania, US	
Win	Griffie Kenbine	TKO 2nd	02-02-1931	Arena, Philadelphia, Pennsylvania, US	
Win	Sammy Novia	TKO 2nd	01-12-1931	Arena, Philadelphia, Pennsylvania, US	
Win	Billy Kelly	KO 2nd 2 minutes 17 seconds	12-08-1930	Arena, Philadelphia, Pennsylvania, US	
Win	Matty White		11-24-1930	Arena, Philadelphia, Pennsylvania, US	
Win	Tommy Maroon		10-02-1930	Arena, Philadelphia, Pennsylvania, US	
Win	Jimmy Savino	KO in 1st	08-18-1930	Arena, Philadelphia, Pennsylvania, US	
Win	Eddie Cool		04-25-1930	Norristown, Pennsylvania, US	
Loss	Danny Taub	Decision	04-03-1930	Broadway A.C., Philadelphia, Pennsylvania, US	
Win	Ray Stinger	Ko in 2nd	03-21-1930	Norristown, Pennsylvania, US	
Win	Jose Allano		03-0-1930	Auditorium, Norristown, Pennsylvania, US	
Win	Al Coulon	Ko 4th round	02-21-1930	Norristown, Pennsylvania, US	
Win	Al Coulon	Ko 2nd round	01-31-1930	Auditorium, Norristown, Pennsylvania, US	
Win	Jack Stanley	Ko in 3rd round	12-12-1929	Broadway A.C., Philadelphia, Pennsylvania, US	
Loss	Bobby Dechter	Decision	10-28-1929	Atlantic City, New Jersey, US	
Win	Sammy Penzi		10-14-1929	North Side Boxing Club, Atlantic City, New Jersey, US	
Win	Johnny Bendon	Ko in 3rd	09-23-1929	North Side Boxing Club, Atlantic City, New Jersey, US	
Loss	Jimmy Dugan		04-18-1929	Broadway A.C., Philadelphia, Pennsylvania, US	
Win	Kid McCalsland	TKO	04-04-1929	Broadway A.C., Philadelphia, Pennsylvania, US	
Win	Billy Richards	KO in 1st	03-13-1929	Olympia A.C., Philadelphia, Pennsylvania, US	
Win	Danny Sheffsky	KO in 1st	02-28-1929	New Broadway A.C., Philadelphia, Pennsylvania, US	
Win	Herb Lewis		1929	Philadelphia, Pennsylvania, US	Exact Date unknown
Draw	Pee Wee Ross		01-22-1929	South Jersey A.A., Camden, New Jersey, US	First fight as a pro
