= Johnny Jadick =

American boxer (1908-1970)

Personal information
- Nickname: Kensington Stringbean
- Nationality: American
- Born: John J. Jadick; June 16, 1908 Philadelphia, Pennsylvania
- Died: April 3, 1970 (aged 61) Philadelphia, Pennsylvania
- Height: 5 ft 8.5 in (1.74 m)
- Weight: Welterweight

Boxing career
- Stance: Orthodox

Boxing record
- Total fights: 164
- Wins: 99
- Win by KO: 15
- Losses: 57
- Draws: 8

John J. Jadick, better known as Johnny Jadick (June 16, 1908 – April 3, 1970) was an American light welterweight boxer and the NBA light welterweight world champion in 1932. In September 1932, the NBA decided not to recognize junior divisions. Jadick continued to reign as the world light welterweight champion until February 1933 when he was defeated by Battling Shaw for the championship which had been continually recognized by the Louisiana State boxing commission. He was born and raised in Philadelphia, Pennsylvania. Though not an exceptionally strong puncher, he had great speed, and an effective left jab. He was managed by Tommy White, and trained by Joe Ferguson.

== Early life and career ==
John Jadick was born on June 16, 1908, in the Kensington section of Philadelphia where he spent most of his life.

One of his first professional victories came in 1925, when he defeated Harry Decker in an eight-round decision. Between July 1923, and March 1927, he won 42 of 45 fights, with only two losses and one draw. In his early career in Philadelphia, Jadick was often managed and promoted by Johhny Burns, particularly when he fought at the Cambria Athletic Club, where Burns worked. Jadick once admitted he patterned his style of boxing from Tommy Loughran, a famous Philadelphian light heavyweight champion, also managed briefly by Burns in his early career. Jadick was quite tall for a lightweight at 5' 8", which gave him an advantage in defending blows, though he lacked the power of some stockier competitors.

On March 12, 1928, Jadick lost to Pete Nebo in a ten-round points decision at the Arena in Philadelphia. Both fought in the featherweight range of 126 pounds. Nebo won from hard, accurate blows at close quarters and when coming out of clinches. Having only a two-inch disadvantage in reach, he was able to maneuver effectively during the infighting to score points. In their two subsequent meetings, Nebo won in a close eight-round newspaper decision on May 6, 1927, in Camden, New Jersey, and March 12, 1928, in a ten-round points decision at the Arena in Philadelphia.

He defeated English-born Jewish lightweight boxing great Al Foreman on May 21, 1928, in an eight-round points decision at the Polo Grounds in New York. One of Jadick's better known opponents, Foreman would take the Canadian, British Empire, and British Board of Control (BBOC) World Lightweight Championships during his career.

On August 8, 1928, Jadick lost to Dick "Honeyboy" Finnegan, considered a serious Jr. Lightweight contender, at Braves Field in Boston, Massachusetts, in a ten-round points decision. Finnegan won an easy victory by exhibiting more speed than Jadick. He won six of the rounds, with Jadick winning only one, and three even. Jadick had defeated Finnegan two months earlier fighting in the lightweight range in a ten-round points decision in his hometown at Shibe Park in Philadelphia before an enormous crowd of 18,000. Jadick built up a lead, taking the first two rounds, but sagged a bit in the middle rounds, hampered somewhat by the wet footing caused by the pouring rain in the outdoor arena. Jadick had enough left to take the decision in the late rounds when the footing in the arena began to dry. The verdict for Jadick, however, was surprisingly unpopular with the home crowd. Finnegan was a competent southpaw who had taken both an Army and Navy and New England Lightweight title earlier in his career.

On December 7, 1928, Jadick defeated talented black boxer Bruce Flowers at Boston Garden in Boston, Massachusetts, in a ten-round points decision. Although Flowers seemed to have an edge in the first part of the bout, Jadick won the decision with a strong comeback in the subsequent rounds.

On January 11, 1929, Jadick faced a seventh round disqualification for holding against Jewish great Louis "Kid" Kaplan at the Boston Garden. Jadick may have been outclassed by Kaplan, who had formerly taken the Featherweight Championship of the World in January 1925.

=== Wins over Henry Tuttle ===
On November 25, 1929, Jadick defeated Henry Tuttle, known as King Tut, a noted Minneapolis lightweight, in an important eighth round Technical Knockout. Tuttle had hopes of competing for the World Lightweight Championship. Their feature match in Philadelphia before a crowd of 7,000, catapulted Jadick to greater recognition, at least among regional boxing fans and officials. Tut did not return to the ring in the eighth round because of a badly injured eye. Jadick had injured Tut's eye early in the bout, and as a result had won several of the succeeding rounds, until Tut appeared to rally in the fifth and sixth. Between the sixth and seventh rounds, the ring physician ordered an end to the bout after examining Tut. Jadick was two pounds lighter than Tut at 134, putting them both near the light welterweight minimum of 135. One year later, Jadick defeated Tut again on October 4, 1930, in a ten-round points decision in Milwaukee, dashing Tuttle's hopes of becoming a lightweight contender.

=== Loss to Benny Bass, 1930 ===
On December 8, 1930, at 132 pounds, Jadick first met exceptional boxer Benny Bass, in a non-title fight, losing in a close ten round unanimous points decision at the Arena in Philadelphia. Jadick used a rapid left, and a jarring right uppercut against his opponent, and seemed to have a decided edge in the fighting at times. Bass, stockier built, pressed the fighting in most of the bout and appeared stronger than Jadick, who had a reliable scientific defense partly due to his six-inch advantage in reach. Bass was a former World Jr. Lightweight champion having taken the title in December 1929. He had also formerly held the World Featherweight Championship in the late 1920s. On July 31, 1934, Jadick would lose to Bass again in a ten-round points decision at Shibe Park in Philadelphia.

On July 14, 1931, Jadick defeated Tony Herrera in a decisive ten round victory at the Myers Bowl in Pittsburgh, after having scored a clean knockdown of his opponent in the first round. Jadick clearly took six of the ten rounds, though one judge voted for Herrera. On November 30, 1931, Jadick lost to Herrera at Motor Square Garden in Pittsburgh in a sixth round Technical Knockout just six weeks before the most important victory of his career against Tony Canzoneri. By the time of the bout, Jadick was fully under the management of Tommy White.

=== Win over Lew Massey, 1931 ===
On October 26, 1931, he defeated highly rated fellow Philadelphian Lew Massey at the Arena in Philadelphia in a bout that was stopped in the seventh because of a cut above Massey's left eye, causing a technical knock-out.

Jadick had fought a ten-round draw with Massey three weeks earlier at the same location before a crowd of 7,000. In the close draw match, Jadick was down in the first round with Massey's flurry of blows helping him to win it. Massey tripped once in the seventh, briefly falling to the mat, but the bout was close with each boxer taking four rounds apiece.

== World Light welter champ ==
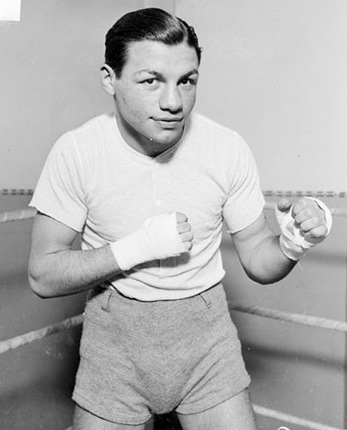
Tony Canzoneri

On January 18, 1932, Jadick became the World Light Welterweight Champion after a ten-round Unanimous Decision against Tony Canzoneri at the Arena in Philadelphia, Pennsylvania. Jadick's jabbing left may have played a major role in his victory. Jadick was very briefly down from a left to the jaw in the first round. The fighting was fierce with frequent toe to toe battling. A few boxing historians today consider Jadick's win quite an upset considering the skill and achievements of Canzoneri, a three division world champion and both a light and jr. welterweight title holder. They attribute Jadick's win partially to partisan officiating by the Philadelphia judges and referees who may have favored the hometown hero. Jadick's World Light Welterweight division title was recognized by the National Boxing Association (NBA) until September 1932, when their recognition of the division lapsed, though Jadick's claim to the title is still generally recognized through February 1933 when he was defeated by Battling Shaw.

== Title defense against Tony Canzoneri, 1932 ==
In a very significant win in a sanctioned light welterweight title match, Jadick defeated Tony Canzoneri, on July 18, 1932, for the second time. The two light welterweights fought a ten-round split decision at Shibe Park in Philadelphia with Jadick scientifically warding off the more aggressive Canzoneri. Jadick's long left jabs effectively halted the frequent advances of Canzoneri. One judge voted for Canzoneri in the close decision, and the ruling for Jadick was not popular with many in the crowd, who may have been swayed by Canzoneri's more aggressive style.

== NBA Light Welterweight Title Defense ==
Jadick defended the championship just once in a rematch against Tony Canzoneri on July 18, 1932, in Philadelphia, Pennsylvania, via Split Decision. In his one successful title defense, he retained the NBA light welterweight championship in one of the last sanctioned fights by the NBA shortly before they stopped recognizing Junior divisions in September 1932. Despite having lost his title outside of the ring, Jadick continued reigning as the world light welterweight champion as recognized by the state of Louisiana before he lost the title to Mexican, Battling Shaw on February 20, 1933, by majority decision. Jadick had several non title bouts between his 3 world championship matches, but were not considered to be fought for his world title as his opponents all weighed over the 140lbs limit of the light welterweight division

== World Light welter title loss, 1933 ==
Jadick lost the World Light Welterweight Championship before 3,000 fans on February 20, 1933, in a decisive ten round mixed decision to Texan-born Mexican boxer "Battling" Shaw at the Coliseum Arena in New Orleans. The loss of the division title by Jadick so quickly was somewhat of a surprise to many of the spectators. Both boxers weighed in at close to 136 pounds. Jadick had the advantage in the early rounds attacking Shaw with stiff rights and left hooks to the head while Shaw went for the body. In Shaw's first title defense, three months later in New Orleans, he was soundly defeated by Tony Canzoneri, who retook the title, knocking Shaw to the canvas in both the first and eighth rounds. Canzoneri's dominance of Shaw made some boxing historians puzzle over how he lost twice to Jadick only the previous year.

On November 17, 1933, Jadick beat Pete Nebo for the first time, defeating him in a ten-round points decision at the Cambria Athletic Club in Philadelphia.

On December 8, 1933, Jadick defeated Tony Falco in a ten-round points decision at the Cambria Athletic Club in Philadelphia. His career and boxing record began a steady, rapidly accelerating decline after his victory.

On April 6, 1934, Jadick defeated Charley Bedami in a ten-round unanimous decision at Holyoke, Massachusetts.

In a noteworthy win, on February 18, 1935, Jadick, at 137 pounds, defeated Fritzie Zivic, 1940 NBA World Welterweight Champion, in a ten-round points decision at the Auditorium in Washington, D. C.

At 145 1/4 pounds, on July 22, 1936, Jadick lost to 1940 Welterweight Champion as recognized by Maryland, Izzy Jannazzo, in a ten-round points decision at the Dykman Oval in Manhattan. In a decisive win, Jannazzo, soon to be a top welterweight contender, put Jadick on the canvas in the first, fourth and sixth rounds. The fight was a benefit for the United Palestine Appeal.

== Boxing retirement ==
From November 1935 to September 1937, Jadick lost all but one of his last twenty fights. He retired from boxing in 1937 after a long downhill slide in his career, fighting his last bout against Mike Piskin on September 24, 1937, at his first major boxing venue, Cambria Stadium in his beloved Philadelphia.

He died on April 3, 1970, at his home on West Silver Street in Philadelphia. Funeral services were held on April 7, the following Tuesday morning at St. Edmund's Catholic Church in Philadelphia. He was buried at Holy Cross Cemetery, and was survived by his wife, Mary.

== Achievements and honors ==
Jadick was elected to the Pennsylvania Boxing Hall of Fame in 1963.

== Professional boxing record ==
All information in this section is derived from BoxRec, unless otherwise stated.

=== Official record ===
164 fights	91 wins	54 losses
By knockout	16	6
By decision	73	47
By disqualification	2	1
Draws	8	
Newspaper decisions/draws	11	

All newspaper decisions are officially regarded as “no decision” bouts and are not counted in the win/loss/draw column.

No.	Result	Record	Opponent	Type	Round	Date	Location	Notes
164	Loss	91–54–8 (11)	Mike Piskin	PTS	10	Sep 24, 1937	Cambria A.C., Philadelphia, Pennsylvania, U.S.	
163	Loss	91–53–8 (11)	Mike Piskin	PTS	8	Aug 27, 1937	Ocean View A.A., Long Branch, New Jersey, U.S.	
162	Loss	91–52–8 (11)	Saverio Turiello	PTS	10	Apr 19, 1937	Valley Arena, Holyoke, Massachusetts, U.S.	
161	Loss	91–51–8 (11)	Ralph Zannelli	PTS	10	Mar 29, 1937	Infantry Hall, Providence, Rhode Island, U.S.	
160	Loss	91–50–8 (11)	Fritzie Zivic	KO	6 (10)	Feb 11, 1937	Duquesne Garden, Pittsburgh, Pennsylvania, U.S.	
159	Loss	91–49–8 (11)	Sammy Luftspring	UD	8	Feb 3, 1937	Maple Leaf Gardens, Toronto, Ontario, Canada	
158	Loss	91–48–8 (11)	Wesley Ramey	UD	10	Jan 22, 1937	Arena, Syracuse, Pennsylvania, U.S.	
157	Loss	91–47–8 (11)	Mickey Serrian	UD	10	Jan 1, 1937	Town Hall, Scranton, Pennsylvania, U.S.	
156	Loss	91–46–8 (11)	Johnny Clinton	PTS	10	Nov 20, 1936	Cambria A.C., Philadelphia, Pennsylvania, U.S.	
155	Win	91–45–8 (11)	Mickey O'Brien	MD	8	Oct 26, 1936	Maple Grove Field House, Lancaster, Pennsylvania, U.S.	
154	Loss	90–45–8 (11)	Jimmy Leto	UD	10	Oct 19, 1936	Turner's Arena, Washington, D.C., U.S.	
153	Loss	90–44–8 (11)	Izzy Jannazzo	PTS	10	Jul 22, 1936	Dyckman Oval, Manhattan, New York City, New York, U.S.	
152	Loss	90–43–8 (11)	Bushy Graham	PTS	8	Jun 15, 1936	Utica Stadium, Utica, New York, U.S.	
151	Loss	90–42–8 (11)	Chino Alvarez	KO	7 (10)	May 28, 1936	Benjamin Field Arena, Tampa, Florida, U.S.	
150	Loss	90–41–8 (11)	Young Gene Buffalo	PTS	10	May 8, 1936	Waltz Dream Arena, Atlantic City, New Jersey, U.S.	
149	Loss	90–40–8 (11)	Tony Canzoneri	PTS	10	Apr 9, 1936	St. Nicholas Arena, New York City, New York, U.S.	
148	Loss	90–39–8 (11)	Sonny Jones	UD	10	Mar 2, 1936	Valley Arena, Holyoke, Massachusetts, U.S.	
147	Loss	90–38–8 (11)	Freddie Cochrane	PTS	10	Feb 24, 1936	Laurel Garden, Newark, New Jersey, U.S.	
146	Loss	90–37–8 (11)	Tony Morgano	PTS	10	Jan 16, 1936	Olympia A.C., Philadelphia, Pennsylvania, U.S.	
145	Win	90–36–8 (11)	Tony Greb	KO	8 (10)	Dec 20, 1935	Coliseum, Bethlehem, Pennsylvania, U.S.	
144	Loss	89–36–8 (11)	Six Second Powell	PTS	8	Dec 9, 1935	Amusement Academy, Plainfield, New Jersey, U.S.	
143	Loss	89–35–8 (11)	Tony Falco	PTS	10	Nov 22, 1935	Cambria A.C., Philadelphia, Pennsylvania, U.S.	
142	Win	89–34–8 (11)	Billy McMahon	MD	10	Nov 4, 1935	Valley Arena, Holyoke, Massachusetts, U.S.	
141	Win	88–34–8 (11)	Billy McMahon	UD	10	Oct 21, 1935	Valley Arena, Holyoke, Massachusetts, U.S.	
140	Loss	87–34–8 (11)	Jack Portney	PTS	10	Oct 14, 1935	Carlin's Park, Baltimore, Maryland, U.S.	
139	Loss	87–33–8 (11)	Willie Pal	PTS	10	Oct 3, 1935	Odd Fellows' Hall, Albany, New York, U.S.	
138	Draw	87–32–8 (11)	Eddie Cool	PTS	10	Sep 27, 1935	Cambria A.C., Philadelphia, Pennsylvania, U.S.	
137	Draw	87–32–7 (11)	George Gibbs	PTS	10	Sep 20, 1935	Cambria A.C., Philadelphia, Pennsylvania, U.S.	
136	Loss	87–32–6 (11)	Tony Falco	PTS	10	Aug 31, 1935	Convention Hall, Atlantic City, New Jersey, U.S.	
135	Win	87–31–6 (11)	George Gibbs	PTS	10	Jul 26, 1935	Atlantic City Auditorium, Atlantic City, New Jersey, U.S.	
134	Loss	86–31–6 (11)	Teddy Loder	PTS	10	Jul 16, 1935	Triboro Stadium, Long Island City, Queens, New York City, New York, U.S.	
133	Win	86–30–6 (11)	Joe Vignali	PTS	10	Jul 1, 1935	Hawkins Stadium, Albany, New York, U.S.	
132	Loss	85–30–6 (11)	Bucky Jones	PTS	8	Jun 10, 1935	Amusement Academy, Plainfield, New Jersey, U.S.	
131	Loss	85–29–6 (11)	Maxie Strub	PTS	10	May 9, 1935	Carney Auditorium, Erie, Pennsylvania, U.S.	
130	Loss	85–28–6 (11)	Charley Burns	PTS	8	Apr 8, 1935	Maple Grove Field House, Lancaster, Pennsylvania, U.S.	
129	Loss	85–27–6 (11)	George Gibbs	SD	10	Mar 15, 1935	Cambria A.C., Philadelphia, Pennsylvania, U.S.	
128	Win	85–26–6 (11)	Fritzie Zivic	PTS	10	Feb 18, 1935	Auditorium, Washington, D.C., U.S.	
127	Win	84–26–6 (11)	Phil Baker	PTS	10	Jan 21, 1935	Auditorium, Washington, D.C., U.S.	
126	Win	83–26–6 (11)	Phil Baker	PTS	10	Jan 11, 1935	Cambria A.C., Philadelphia, Pennsylvania, U.S.	
125	Loss	82–26–6 (11)	Sammy Fuller	TKO	4 (10)	Nov 30, 1934	Madison Square Garden, New York City, New York, U.S.	
124	Win	82–25–6 (11)	Mickey Serrian	PTS	10	Oct 19, 1934	Cambria A.C., Philadelphia, Pennsylvania, U.S.	
123	Draw	81–25–6 (11)	Bucky Jones	PTS	10	Sep 21, 1934	Cambria A.C., Philadelphia, Pennsylvania, U.S.	
122	Loss	81–25–5 (11)	Benny Bass	PTS	10	Jul 31, 1934	Baker Bowl, Philadelphia, Pennsylvania, U.S.	
121	Loss	81–24–5 (11)	Eddie Cool	MD	10	Jun 20, 1934	Cambria Stadium, Philadelphia, Pennsylvania, U.S.	
120	Win	81–23–5 (11)	Charley Badami	UD	10	Apr 16, 1934	Valley Arena, Holyoke, Massachusetts, U.S.	
119	Loss	80–23–5 (11)	Lou Ambers	UD	10	Mar 19, 1934	Valley Arena, Holyoke, Massachusetts, U.S.	
118	Loss	80–22–5 (11)	Tony Falco	PTS	10	Mar 12, 1934	Arena, Philadelphia, Pennsylvania, U.S.	
117	Win	80–21–5 (11)	Mickey Serrian	PTS	10	Feb 26, 1934	Arena, Syracuse, New York, U.S.	
116	Draw	79–21–5 (11)	Harry Serody	PTS	10	Feb 23, 1934	Cambria A.C., Philadelphia, Pennsylvania, U.S.	
115	Win	79–21–4 (11)	Ray Napolitano	PTS	6	Feb 10, 1934	Ridgewood Grove, Brooklyn, New York City, New York, U.S.	
114	Loss	78–21–4 (11)	Jimmy Leto	UD	10	Feb 5, 1934	Valley Arena, Holyoke, Massachusetts, U.S.	
113	Win	78–20–4 (11)	Joe Glick	PTS	10	Jan 12, 1934	Cambria A.C., Philadelphia, Pennsylvania, U.S.	
112	Win	77–20–4 (11)	Tony Falco	SD	10	Dec 8, 1933	Cambria A.C., Philadelphia, Pennsylvania, U.S.	
111	Win	76–20–4 (11)	Pete Nebo	PTS	10	Nov 17, 1933	Cambria A.C., Philadelphia, Pennsylvania, U.S.	
110	Win	75–20–4 (11)	Stumpy Jacobs	PTS	10	Oct 13, 1933	Cambria A.C., Philadelphia, Pennsylvania, U.S.	
109	Loss	74–20–4 (11)	Herbert Lewis Hardwick	PTS	10	Apr 17, 1933	Arena, New Haven, Connecticut, U.S.	
108	Loss	74–19–4 (11)	Eddie Cool	MD	10	Apr 3, 1933	Arena, Philadelphia, Pennsylvania, U.S.	
107	Win	74–18–4 (11)	Eddie Isaacs	PTS	10	Mar 20, 1933	Toledo, Ohio, U.S.	Exact date in March 1933 unknown
106	Loss	73–18–4 (11)	Wesley Ramey	PTS	10	Mar 3, 1933	Grand Rapids, Michigan, U.S.	
105	Loss	73–17–4 (11)	Battling Shaw	MD	10	Feb 20, 1933	Coliseum Arena, New Orleans, Louisiana, U.S.	Lost world light welterweight title
104	Draw	73–16–4 (11)	Johnny Lucas	PTS	10	Feb 3, 1933	Cambria A.C., Philadelphia, Pennsylvania, U.S.	
103	Win	73–16–3 (11)	Lew Raymond	TKO	5 (10)	Nov 18, 1932	Cambria A.C., Philadelphia, Pennsylvania, U.S.	
102	Win	72–16–3 (11)	Joey Harrison	PTS	10	Oct 20, 1932	Armory, Paterson, New Jersey, U.S.	
101	Win	71–16–3 (11)	Lew Raymond	UD	8	Oct 4, 1932	Armory, Reading, Pennsylvania, U.S.	
100	Win	70–16–3 (11)	Tony Canzoneri	SD	10	Jul 18, 1932	Baker Bowl, Philadelphia, Pennsylvania, U.S.	Retained NBA light welterweight title
99	Win	69–16–3 (11)	Pat Igo	UD	10	Jun 28, 1932	Lakewood Park, Mahanoy City, Pennsylvania, U.S.	
98	Win	68–16–3 (11)	Herman Follins	PTS	10	May 26, 1932	Hickey Park, Millvale, Pennsylvania, U.S.	
97	Win	67–16–3 (11)	Pat Igo	UD	10	Mar 29, 1932	South Main Street Armory, Wilkes-Barre, Pennsylvania, U.S.	
96	Win	66–16–3 (11)	Wildcat O'Connor	UD	10	Feb 25, 1932	South Main Street Armory, Wilkes-Barre, Pennsylvania, U.S.	
95	Loss	65–16–3 (11)	Harry Dublinsky	MD	10	Feb 8, 1932	Arena, Philadelphia, Pennsylvania, U.S.	
94	Win	65–15–3 (11)	Tony Canzoneri	UD	10	Jan 18, 1932	Arena, Philadelphia, Pennsylvania, U.S.	Won NBA light welterweight title
93	Loss	64–15–3 (11)	Tony Herrera	TKO	6 (10)	Nov 30, 1931	Motor Square Garden, Pittsburgh, Pennsylvania, U.S.	
92	Win	64–14–3 (11)	Lew Massey	RTD	7 (10)	Oct 26, 1931	Arena, Philadelphia, Pennsylvania, U.S.	
91	Draw	63–14–3 (11)	Lew Massey	PTS	10	Oct 5, 1931	Arena, Philadelphia, Pennsylvania, U.S.	
90	Loss	63–14–2 (11)	Sammy Dorfman	SD	10	Aug 11, 1931	Meyers Bowl, North Braddock, Pennsylvania, U.S.	
89	Win	63–13–2 (11)	Tony Herrera	SD	10	Jul 13, 1931	Meyers Bowl, North Braddock, Pennsylvania, U.S.	
88	Win	62–13–2 (11)	Tommy Liberto	PTS	8	Jun 2, 1931	Auditorium, Wilmington, Delaware, U.S.	
87	Loss	61–13–2 (11)	Wesley Ramey	PTS	8	May 25, 1931	Chicago Stadium, Chicago, Illinois, U.S.	
86	Win	61–12–2 (11)	Davey Abad	NWS	10	Apr 10, 1931	Coliseum, Saint Louis, Missouri, U.S.	
85	Win	61–12–2 (10)	Ray Collins	KO	6 (10)	Mar 6, 1931	Olympia Stadium, Detroit, Michigan, U.S.	
84	Loss	60–12–2 (10)	Ray Miller	KO	1 (10)	Feb 20, 1931	Olympia Stadium, Detroit, Michigan, U.S.	
83	Loss	60–11–2 (10)	Benny Bass	UD	10	Dec 8, 1930	Arena, Philadelphia, Pennsylvania, U.S.	
82	Win	60–10–2 (10)	Tommy Grogan	PTS	10	Nov 17, 1930	Arena, Philadelphia, Pennsylvania, U.S.	
81	Win	59–10–2 (10)	King Tut	PTS	10	Oct 4, 1930	Auditorium, Milwaukee, Wisconsin, U.S.	
80	Win	58–10–2 (10)	Pat Igo	PTS	10	Jun 16, 1930	Fair Grounds Arena, Allentown, Pennsylvania, U.S.	
79	Draw	57–10–2 (10)	Gaston LeCadre	PTS	10	Feb 3, 1930	Arena, Philadelphia, Pennsylvania, U.S.	
78	Win	57–10–1 (10)	King Tut	TKO	8 (10)	Nov 25, 1929	Arena, Philadelphia, Pennsylvania, U.S.	
77	Win	56–10–1 (10)	Luis Vicentini	PTS	10	Nov 18, 1929	Arena, Philadelphia, Pennsylvania, U.S.	
76	Win	55–10–1 (10)	Eddie Reed	PTS	10	Oct 28, 1929	Arena, Philadelphia, Pennsylvania, U.S.	
75	Loss	54–10–1 (10)	Eddie Reed	KO	1 (10)	Sep 24, 1929	Sesquicentennial Stadium, Philadelphia, Pennsylvania, U.S.	
74	Win	54–9–1 (10)	Lope Tenorio	PTS	10	Sep 18, 1929	Baker Bowl, Philadelphia, Pennsylvania, U.S.	
73	Loss	53–9–1 (10)	Billy Wallace	PTS	10	Jul 24, 1929	Shibe Park, Philadelphia, Pennsylvania, U.S.	For vacant USA Pennsylvania lightweight title
72	Loss	53–8–1 (10)	Tommy Grogan	PTS	10	Jun 18, 1929	Fair Grounds Arena, Allentown, Pennsylvania, U.S.	
71	Win	53–7–1 (10)	Joey Kaufman	DQ	3 (10)	Mar 14, 1929	Manhattan Auditorium, Allentown, Pennsylvania, U.S.	Kaufman was disqualified for repeated low blows
70	Win	52–7–1 (10)	Henri Dewancker	PTS	10	Feb 14, 1929	Coliseum, Bethlehem, Pennsylvania, U.S.	
69	Loss	51–7–1 (10)	Louis 'Kid' Kaplan	DQ	7 (10)	Jan 11, 1929	Boston Garden, Boston, Massachusetts, U.S.	Jadick was disqualified for persistent holding
68	Win	51–6–1 (10)	Bruce Flowers	PTS	10	Dec 7, 1928	Boston Garden, Boston, Massachusetts, U.S.	
67	Win	50–6–1 (10)	Steve Smith	PTS	10	Nov 22, 1928	Dreamland Arena, Allentown, Pennsylvania, U.S.	
66	Loss	49–6–1 (10)	Emory Cabana	PTS	10	Oct 15, 1928	Arena, Philadelphia, Pennsylvania, U.S.	
65	Loss	49–5–1 (10)	Dick Finnegan	PTS	10	Aug 8, 1928	Braves Field, Boston, Massachusetts, U.S.	
64	Win	49–4–1 (10)	Dick Finnegan	PTS	10	Jun 18, 1928	Shibe Park, Philadelphia, Pennsylvania, U.S.	
63	Win	48–4–1 (10)	Al Foreman	PTS	8	May 21, 1928	Polo Grounds, New York City, New York, U.S.	
62	Win	47–4–1 (10)	Chuck Liddell	NWS	8	Apr 26, 1928	Auditorium, Wilmington, Delaware, U.S.	
61	Win	47–4–1 (9)	Al Winkler	PTS	8	Mar 26, 1928	Arena, Philadelphia, Pennsylvania, U.S.	
60	Loss	46–4–1 (9)	Pete Nebo	PTS	10	Mar 12, 1928	Arena, Philadelphia, Pennsylvania, U.S.	
59	Win	46–3–1 (9)	Jackie Snyder	TKO	7 (10)	Feb 6, 1928	Arena, Philadelphia, Pennsylvania, U.S.	
58	Win	45–3–1 (9)	Henri Dewancker	SD	10	Jan 27, 1928	Cambria A.C., Philadelphia, Pennsylvania, U.S.	
57	Win	44–3–1 (9)	Bucky Boyle	PTS	10	Jan 2, 1928	Arena, Philadelphia, Pennsylvania, U.S.	
56	Win	43–3–1 (9)	Hubert Gillis	PTS	10	Dec 5, 1927	Arena, Philadelphia, Pennsylvania, U.S.	
55	Win	42–3–1 (9)	Tommy Gervel	UD	10	Nov 18, 1927	Cambria A.C., Philadelphia, Pennsylvania, U.S.	
54	Loss	41–3–1 (9)	Joe Glick	PTS	10	Oct 26, 1927	108th Field Artillery Armory, Philadelphia, Pennsylvania, U.S.	
53	Win	41–2–1 (9)	Billy Pop Humphries	PTS	10	Oct 14, 1927	Cambria A.C., Philadelphia, Pennsylvania, U.S.	
52	Win	40–2–1 (9)	Tim O'Dowd	PTS	10	Sep 23, 1927	Cambria A.C., Philadelphia, Pennsylvania, U.S.	
51	Win	39–2–1 (9)	Johnny Sheppard	PTS	10	Jun 3, 1927	Boger Field, Philadelphia, Pennsylvania, U.S.	
50	Loss	38–2–1 (9)	Pete Nebo	NWS	8	May 6, 1927	Convention Hall, Camden, New Jersey, U.S.	
49	Draw	38–2–1 (8)	Joey Williams	PTS	10	Apr 22, 1927	Cambria A.C., Philadelphia, Pennsylvania, U.S.	
48	Loss	38–2 (8)	Cowboy Eddie Anderson	PTS	10	Mar 21, 1927	Arena, Philadelphia, Pennsylvania, U.S.	
47	Win	38–1 (8)	Eddie Ochs	KO	1 (10)	Mar 4, 1927	Cambria A.C., Philadelphia, Pennsylvania, U.S.	
46	Win	37–1 (8)	George Siddons	PTS	10	Jan 21, 1927	Cambria A.C., Philadelphia, Pennsylvania, U.S.	
45	Win	36–1 (8)	Wilbur Cohen	PTS	10	Dec 25, 1926	Cambria A.C., Philadelphia, Pennsylvania, U.S.	
44	Win	35–1 (8)	George Siddons	PTS	10	Dec 3, 1926	Cambria A.C., Philadelphia, Pennsylvania, U.S.	
43	Win	34–1 (8)	Ralph Repman	KO	3 (10)	Nov 5, 1926	Cambria A.C., Philadelphia, Pennsylvania, U.S.	
42	Win	33–1 (8)	Nick Quagarelli	PTS	10	Oct 18, 1926	Arena, Philadelphia, Pennsylvania, U.S.	
41	Win	32–1 (8)	Georges Amblard	PTS	10	Oct 1, 1926	Cambria A.C., Philadelphia, Pennsylvania, U.S.	
40	Win	31–1 (8)	Len Brenner	KO	6 (10)	Sep 10, 1926	Cambria A.C., Philadelphia, Pennsylvania, U.S.	
39	Win	30–1 (8)	Joey Williams	SD	8	Jul 8, 1926	Carnival Park, West Manayunk, Pennsylvania, U.S.	
38	Win	29–1 (8)	Harry Scott	NWS	8	Jul 2, 1926	Bacharach Ball Park, Atlantic City, New Jersey, U.S.	
37	Win	29–1 (7)	Young Freddie Welsh	PTS	8	Jun 10, 1926	Carnival Park, West Manayunk, Pennsylvania, U.S.	
36	Win	28–1 (7)	Harry Scott	PTS	10	May 21, 1926	Cambria A.C., Philadelphia, Pennsylvania, U.S.	
35	Win	27–1 (7)	Pedro Aguinaldo	KO	3 (8)	Apr 23, 1926	Cambria A.C., Philadelphia, Pennsylvania, U.S.	
34	Win	26–1 (7)	Joe Souza	PTS	6	Apr 12, 1926	Arena, Philadelphia, Pennsylvania, U.S.	
33	Win	25–1 (7)	Harry Scott	PTS	8	Apr 9, 1926	Cambria A.C., Philadelphia, Pennsylvania, U.S.	
32	Win	24–1 (7)	Jimmy Burns	PTS	8	Mar 19, 1926	Cambria A.C., Philadelphia, Pennsylvania, U.S.	
31	Win	23–1 (7)	Lew Skymer	PTS	8	Feb 26, 1926	Cambria A.C., Philadelphia, Pennsylvania, U.S.	
30	Win	22–1 (7)	Young Freddie Welsh	PTS	8	Feb 5, 1926	Cambria A.C., Philadelphia, Pennsylvania, U.S.	
29	Win	21–1 (7)	Young Freddie Welsh	UD	8	Jan 22, 1926	Cambria A.C., Philadelphia, Pennsylvania, U.S.	
28	Win	20–1 (7)	Steve Nitchie	TKO	8 (8)	Jan 1, 1926	Cambria A.C., Philadelphia, Pennsylvania, U.S.	
27	Win	19–1 (7)	Tommy Murray	PTS	10	Nov 26, 1925	Cambria A.C., Philadelphia, Pennsylvania, U.S.	
26	Win	18–1 (7)	Jackie Hindle	NWS	8	Nov 5, 1925	Temple Theatre, Camden, New Jersey, U.S.	
25	Win	18–1 (6)	Pinky Kaufman	KO	4 (8)	Oct 23, 1925	Cambria A.C., Philadelphia, Pennsylvania, U.S.	
24	Win	17–1 (6)	Lew Skymer	PTS	8	Oct 22, 1925	Temple Theater, Camden, New Jersey, U.S.	
23	Win	17–1 (5)	Jimmy Burns	PTS	8	Oct 9, 1925	Cambria A.C., Philadelphia, Pennsylvania, U.S.	
22	Win	16–1 (5)	Harry Decker	PTS	8	Sep 11, 1925	Cambria A.C., Philadelphia, Pennsylvania, U.S.	
21	Win	15–1 (5)	Harry Decker	PTS	8	Aug 3, 1925	Carnival Park, West Manayunk, Pennsylvania, U.S.	
20	Loss	14–1 (5)	Battling Mack	NWS	10	Jul 30, 1925	Public Service Ball Park, Camden, New Jersey, U.S.	
19	Win	14–1 (4)	Billy Pimpus	PTS	10	Apr 24, 1925	Cambria A.C., Philadelphia, Pennsylvania, U.S.	
18	Win	13–1 (4)	Joe Wilton	PTS	6	Apr 3, 1925	Cambria A.C., Philadelphia, Pennsylvania, U.S.	
17	Win	12–1 (4)	Billy Hauber	KO	1 (6)	Mar 13, 1925	Cambria A.C., Philadelphia, Pennsylvania, U.S.	
16	Win	11–1 (4)	Dave Frey	PTS	6	Feb 20, 1925	Cambria A.C., Philadelphia, Pennsylvania, U.S.	
15	Win	10–1 (4)	Leo Reynolds	TKO	6 (6)	Jan 23, 1925	Cambria A.C., Philadelphia, Pennsylvania, U.S.	
14	Win	9–1 (4)	Harry Gimbel	PTS	8	Jan 9, 1925	Cambria A.C., Philadelphia, Pennsylvania, U.S.	
13	Win	8–1 (4)	Tommy Maher	PTS	6	Dec 25, 1924	Cambria A.C., Philadelphia, Pennsylvania, U.S.	
12	Win	7–1 (4)	Kid Apollo	NWS	?	Dec 5, 1924	Armory, Bridgeton, New Jersey, U.S.	
11	Win	7–1 (3)	Mickey Birket	DQ	2 (6)	Nov 11, 1924	Midway Auditorium, Philipsburg, Pennsylvania, U.S.	
10	Win	6–1 (3)	Sammy Carson	PTS	6	Sep 12, 1924	Cambria A.C., Philadelphia, Pennsylvania, U.S.	
9	Loss	5–1 (3)	Jack Metz	NWS	6	Jul 14, 1924	Waltz Dream Arena, Atlantic City, New Jersey, U.S.	
8	Loss	5–1 (2)	Steve Nitchie	UD	6	May 12, 1924	Convention Hall, Lancaster, Pennsylvania, U.S.	
7	Win	5–0 (2)	Steve Nitchie	PTS	6	Apr 21, 1924	Convention Hall, Lancaster, Pennsylvania, U.S.	
6	Win	4–0 (2)	Teddy Squint	UD	6	Apr 8, 1924	Armory, Reading, Pennsylvania, U.S.	
5	Win	3–0 (2)	Patsy Togo	NWS	6	Mar 31, 1924	Waltz Dream Arena, Atlantic City, New Jersey, U.S.	
4	Win	3–0 (1)	Young Tommy Langdon	PTS	6	Mar 14, 1924	Cambria A.C., Philadelphia, Pennsylvania, U.S.	
3	Win	2–0 (1)	Frank Baker	NWS	4	Nov 2, 1923	Cambria A.C., Philadelphia, Pennsylvania, U.S.	
2	Win	2–0	Larry Henderson	TKO	3 (6)	Aug 24, 1923	Logan A.C., Philadelphia, Pennsylvania, U.S.	
1	Win	1–0	Johnny Dougherty	KO	3 (6)	Jul 23, 1923	Logan A.C., Philadelphia, Pennsylvania, U.S.	

=== Unofficial record ===
164 fights	99 wins	57 losses
By knockout	16	6
By decision	81	50
By disqualification	2	1
Draws	8	

Record with the inclusion of newspaper decisions in the win/loss/draw column.

No.	Result	Record	Opponent	Type	Round	Date	Location	Notes
164	Loss	99–57–8	Mike Piskin	PTS	10	Sep 24, 1937	Cambria A.C., Philadelphia, Pennsylvania, U.S.	
163	Loss	99–56–8	Mike Piskin	PTS	8	Aug 27, 1937	Ocean View A.A., Long Branch, New Jersey, U.S.	
162	Loss	99–55–8	Saverio Turiello	PTS	10	Apr 19, 1937	Valley Arena, Holyoke, Massachusetts, U.S.	
161	Loss	99–54–8	Ralph Zannelli	PTS	10	Mar 29, 1937	Infantry Hall, Providence, Rhode Island, U.S.	
160	Loss	99–53–8	Fritzie Zivic	KO	6 (10)	Feb 11, 1937	Duquesne Garden, Pittsburgh, Pennsylvania, U.S.	
159	Loss	99–52–8	Sammy Luftspring	UD	8	Feb 3, 1937	Maple Leaf Gardens, Toronto, Ontario, Canada	
158	Loss	99–51–8	Wesley Ramey	UD	10	Jan 22, 1937	Arena, Syracuse, Pennsylvania, U.S.	
157	Loss	99–50–8	Mickey Serrian	UD	10	Jan 1, 1937	Town Hall, Scranton, Pennsylvania, U.S.	
156	Loss	99–49–8	Johnny Clinton	PTS	10	Nov 20, 1936	Cambria A.C., Philadelphia, Pennsylvania, U.S.	
155	Win	99–48–8	Mickey O'Brien	MD	8	Oct 26, 1936	Maple Grove Field House, Lancaster, Pennsylvania, U.S.	
154	Loss	98–48–8	Jimmy Leto	UD	10	Oct 19, 1936	Turner's Arena, Washington, D.C., U.S.	
153	Loss	98–47–8	Izzy Jannazzo	PTS	10	Jul 22, 1936	Dyckman Oval, Manhattan, New York City, New York, U.S.	
152	Loss	98–46–8	Bushy Graham	PTS	8	Jun 15, 1936	Utica Stadium, Utica, New York, U.S.	
151	Loss	98–45–8	Chino Alvarez	KO	7 (10)	May 28, 1936	Benjamin Field Arena, Tampa, Florida, U.S.	
150	Loss	98–44–8	Young Gene Buffalo	PTS	10	May 8, 1936	Waltz Dream Arena, Atlantic City, New Jersey, U.S.	
149	Loss	98–43–8	Tony Canzoneri	PTS	10	Apr 9, 1936	St. Nicholas Arena, New York City, New York, U.S.	
148	Loss	98–42–8	Sonny Jones	UD	10	Mar 2, 1936	Valley Arena, Holyoke, Massachusetts, U.S.	
147	Loss	98–41–8	Freddie Cochrane	PTS	10	Feb 24, 1936	Laurel Garden, Newark, New Jersey, U.S.	
146	Loss	98–40–8	Tony Morgano	PTS	10	Jan 16, 1936	Olympia A.C., Philadelphia, Pennsylvania, U.S.	
145	Win	98–39–8	Tony Greb	KO	8 (10)	Dec 20, 1935	Coliseum, Bethlehem, Pennsylvania, U.S.	
144	Loss	97–39–8	Six Second Powell	PTS	8	Dec 9, 1935	Amusement Academy, Plainfield, New Jersey, U.S.	
143	Loss	97–38–8	Tony Falco	PTS	10	Nov 22, 1935	Cambria A.C., Philadelphia, Pennsylvania, U.S.	
142	Win	97–37–8	Billy McMahon	MD	10	Nov 4, 1935	Valley Arena, Holyoke, Massachusetts, U.S.	
141	Win	96–37–8	Billy McMahon	UD	10	Oct 21, 1935	Valley Arena, Holyoke, Massachusetts, U.S.	
140	Loss	95–37–8	Jack Portney	PTS	10	Oct 14, 1935	Carlin's Park, Baltimore, Maryland, U.S.	
139	Loss	95–36–8	Willie Pal	PTS	10	Oct 3, 1935	Odd Fellows' Hall, Albany, New York, U.S.	
138	Draw	95–35–8	Eddie Cool	PTS	10	Sep 27, 1935	Cambria A.C., Philadelphia, Pennsylvania, U.S.	
137	Draw	95–35–7	George Gibbs	PTS	10	Sep 20, 1935	Cambria A.C., Philadelphia, Pennsylvania, U.S.	
136	Loss	95–35–6	Tony Falco	PTS	10	Aug 31, 1935	Convention Hall, Atlantic City, New Jersey, U.S.	
135	Win	95–34–6	George Gibbs	PTS	10	Jul 26, 1935	Atlantic City Auditorium, Atlantic City, New Jersey, U.S.	
134	Loss	94–34–6	Teddy Loder	PTS	10	Jul 16, 1935	Triboro Stadium, Long Island City, Queens, New York City, New York, U.S.	
133	Win	94–33–6	Joe Vignali	PTS	10	Jul 1, 1935	Hawkins Stadium, Albany, New York, U.S.	
132	Loss	93–33–6	Bucky Jones	PTS	8	Jun 10, 1935	Amusement Academy, Plainfield, New Jersey, U.S.	
131	Loss	93–32–6	Maxie Strub	PTS	10	May 9, 1935	Carney Auditorium, Erie, Pennsylvania, U.S.	
130	Loss	93–31–6	Charley Burns	PTS	8	Apr 8, 1935	Maple Grove Field House, Lancaster, Pennsylvania, U.S.	
129	Loss	93–30–6	George Gibbs	SD	10	Mar 15, 1935	Cambria A.C., Philadelphia, Pennsylvania, U.S.	
128	Win	93–29–6	Fritzie Zivic	PTS	10	Feb 18, 1935	Auditorium, Washington, D.C., U.S.	
127	Win	92–29–6	Phil Baker	PTS	10	Jan 21, 1935	Auditorium, Washington, D.C., U.S.	
126	Win	91–29–6	Phil Baker	PTS	10	Jan 11, 1935	Cambria A.C., Philadelphia, Pennsylvania, U.S.	
125	Loss	90–29–6	Sammy Fuller	TKO	4 (10)	Nov 30, 1934	Madison Square Garden, New York City, New York, U.S.	
124	Win	90–28–6	Mickey Serrian	PTS	10	Oct 19, 1934	Cambria A.C., Philadelphia, Pennsylvania, U.S.	
123	Draw	89–28–6	Bucky Jones	PTS	10	Sep 21, 1934	Cambria A.C., Philadelphia, Pennsylvania, U.S.	
122	Loss	89–28–5	Benny Bass	PTS	10	Jul 31, 1934	Baker Bowl, Philadelphia, Pennsylvania, U.S.	
121	Loss	89–27–5	Eddie Cool	MD	10	Jun 20, 1934	Cambria Stadium, Philadelphia, Pennsylvania, U.S.	
120	Win	89–26–5	Charley Badami	UD	10	Apr 16, 1934	Valley Arena, Holyoke, Massachusetts, U.S.	
119	Loss	88–26–5	Lou Ambers	UD	10	Mar 19, 1934	Valley Arena, Holyoke, Massachusetts, U.S.	
118	Loss	88–25–5	Tony Falco	PTS	10	Mar 12, 1934	Arena, Philadelphia, Pennsylvania, U.S.	
117	Win	88–24–5	Mickey Serrian	PTS	10	Feb 26, 1934	Arena, Syracuse, New York, U.S.	
116	Draw	87–24–5	Harry Serody	PTS	10	Feb 23, 1934	Cambria A.C., Philadelphia, Pennsylvania, U.S.	
115	Win	87–24–4	Ray Napolitano	PTS	6	Feb 10, 1934	Ridgewood Grove, Brooklyn, New York City, New York, U.S.	
114	Loss	86–24–4	Jimmy Leto	UD	10	Feb 5, 1934	Valley Arena, Holyoke, Massachusetts, U.S.	
113	Win	86–23–4	Joe Glick	PTS	10	Jan 12, 1934	Cambria A.C., Philadelphia, Pennsylvania, U.S.	
112	Win	85–23–4	Tony Falco	SD	10	Dec 8, 1933	Cambria A.C., Philadelphia, Pennsylvania, U.S.	
111	Win	84–23–4	Pete Nebo	PTS	10	Nov 17, 1933	Cambria A.C., Philadelphia, Pennsylvania, U.S.	
110	Win	83–23–4	Stumpy Jacobs	PTS	10	Oct 13, 1933	Cambria A.C., Philadelphia, Pennsylvania, U.S.	
109	Loss	82–23–4	Herbert Lewis Hardwick	PTS	10	Apr 17, 1933	Arena, New Haven, Connecticut, U.S.	
108	Loss	82–22–4	Eddie Cool	MD	10	Apr 3, 1933	Arena, Philadelphia, Pennsylvania, U.S.	
107	Win	82–21–4	Eddie Isaacs	PTS	10	Mar 20, 1933	Toledo, Ohio, U.S.	Exact date in March 1933 unknown
106	Loss	81–21–4	Wesley Ramey	PTS	10	Mar 3, 1933	Grand Rapids, Michigan, U.S.	
105	Loss	81–20–4	Battling Shaw	MD	10	Feb 20, 1933	Coliseum Arena, New Orleans, Louisiana, U.S.	Lost world light welterweight title
104	Draw	81–19–4	Johnny Lucas	PTS	10	Feb 3, 1933	Cambria A.C., Philadelphia, Pennsylvania, U.S.	
103	Win	81–19–3	Lew Raymond	TKO	5 (10)	Nov 18, 1932	Cambria A.C., Philadelphia, Pennsylvania, U.S.	
102	Win	80–19–3	Joey Harrison	PTS	10	Oct 20, 1932	Armory, Paterson, New Jersey, U.S.	
101	Win	79–19–3	Lew Raymond	UD	8	Oct 4, 1932	Armory, Reading, Pennsylvania, U.S.	
100	Win	78–19–3	Tony Canzoneri	SD	10	Jul 18, 1932	Baker Bowl, Philadelphia, Pennsylvania, U.S.	Retained NBA light welterweight title
99	Win	77–19–3	Pat Igo	UD	10	Jun 28, 1932	Lakewood Park, Mahanoy City, Pennsylvania, U.S.	
98	Win	76–19–3	Herman Follins	PTS	10	May 26, 1932	Hickey Park, Millvale, Pennsylvania, U.S.	
97	Win	75–19–3	Pat Igo	UD	10	Mar 29, 1932	South Main Street Armory, Wilkes-Barre, Pennsylvania, U.S.	
96	Win	74–19–3	Wildcat O'Connor	UD	10	Feb 25, 1932	South Main Street Armory, Wilkes-Barre, Pennsylvania, U.S.	
95	Loss	73–19–3	Harry Dublinsky	MD	10	Feb 8, 1932	Arena, Philadelphia, Pennsylvania, U.S.	
94	Win	73–18–3	Tony Canzoneri	UD	10	Jan 18, 1932	Arena, Philadelphia, Pennsylvania, U.S.	Won NBA light welterweight title
93	Loss	72–18–3	Tony Herrera	TKO	6 (10)	Nov 30, 1931	Motor Square Garden, Pittsburgh, Pennsylvania, U.S.	
92	Win	72–17–3	Lew Massey	RTD	7 (10)	Oct 26, 1931	Arena, Philadelphia, Pennsylvania, U.S.	
91	Draw	71–17–3	Lew Massey	PTS	10	Oct 5, 1931	Arena, Philadelphia, Pennsylvania, U.S.	
90	Loss	71–17–2	Sammy Dorfman	SD	10	Aug 11, 1931	Meyers Bowl, North Braddock, Pennsylvania, U.S.	
89	Win	71–16–2	Tony Herrera	SD	10	Jul 13, 1931	Meyers Bowl, North Braddock, Pennsylvania, U.S.	
88	Win	70–16–2	Tommy Liberto	PTS	8	Jun 2, 1931	Auditorium, Wilmington, Delaware, U.S.	
87	Loss	69–16–2	Wesley Ramey	PTS	8	May 25, 1931	Chicago Stadium, Chicago, Illinois, U.S.	
86	Win	69–15–2	Davey Abad	NWS	10	Apr 10, 1931	Coliseum, Saint Louis, Missouri, U.S.	
85	Win	68–15–2	Ray Collins	KO	6 (10)	Mar 6, 1931	Olympia Stadium, Detroit, Michigan, U.S.	
84	Loss	67–15–2	Ray Miller	KO	1 (10)	Feb 20, 1931	Olympia Stadium, Detroit, Michigan, U.S.	
83	Loss	67–14–2	Benny Bass	UD	10	Dec 8, 1930	Arena, Philadelphia, Pennsylvania, U.S.	
82	Win	67–13–2	Tommy Grogan	PTS	10	Nov 17, 1930	Arena, Philadelphia, Pennsylvania, U.S.	
81	Win	66–13–2	King Tut	PTS	10	Oct 4, 1930	Auditorium, Milwaukee, Wisconsin, U.S.	
80	Win	65–13–2	Pat Igo	PTS	10	Jun 16, 1930	Fair Grounds Arena, Allentown, Pennsylvania, U.S.	
79	Draw	64–13–2	Gaston LeCadre	PTS	10	Feb 3, 1930	Arena, Philadelphia, Pennsylvania, U.S.	
78	Win	64–13–1	King Tut	TKO	8 (10)	Nov 25, 1929	Arena, Philadelphia, Pennsylvania, U.S.	
77	Win	63–13–1	Luis Vicentini	PTS	10	Nov 18, 1929	Arena, Philadelphia, Pennsylvania, U.S.	
76	Win	62–13–1	Eddie Reed	PTS	10	Oct 28, 1929	Arena, Philadelphia, Pennsylvania, U.S.	
75	Loss	61–13–1	Eddie Reed	KO	1 (10)	Sep 24, 1929	Sesquicentennial Stadium, Philadelphia, Pennsylvania, U.S.	
74	Win	61–12–1	Lope Tenorio	PTS	10	Sep 18, 1929	Baker Bowl, Philadelphia, Pennsylvania, U.S.	
73	Loss	60–12–1	Billy Wallace	PTS	10	Jul 24, 1929	Shibe Park, Philadelphia, Pennsylvania, U.S.	For vacant USA Pennsylvania lightweight title
72	Loss	60–11–1	Tommy Grogan	PTS	10	Jun 18, 1929	Fair Grounds Arena, Allentown, Pennsylvania, U.S.	
71	Win	60–10–1	Joey Kaufman	DQ	3 (10)	Mar 14, 1929	Manhattan Auditorium, Allentown, Pennsylvania, U.S.	Kaufman was disqualified for repeated low blows
70	Win	59–10–1	Henri Dewancker	PTS	10	Feb 14, 1929	Coliseum, Bethlehem, Pennsylvania, U.S.	
69	Loss	58–10–1	Louis 'Kid' Kaplan	DQ	7 (10)	Jan 11, 1929	Boston Garden, Boston, Massachusetts, U.S.	Jadick was disqualified for persistent holding
68	Win	58–9–1	Bruce Flowers	PTS	10	Dec 7, 1928	Boston Garden, Boston, Massachusetts, U.S.	
67	Win	57–9–1	Steve Smith	PTS	10	Nov 22, 1928	Dreamland Arena, Allentown, Pennsylvania, U.S.	
66	Loss	56–9–1	Emory Cabana	PTS	10	Oct 15, 1928	Arena, Philadelphia, Pennsylvania, U.S.	
65	Loss	56–8–1	Dick Finnegan	PTS	10	Aug 8, 1928	Braves Field, Boston, Massachusetts, U.S.	
64	Win	56–7–1	Dick Finnegan	PTS	10	Jun 18, 1928	Shibe Park, Philadelphia, Pennsylvania, U.S.	
63	Win	55–7–1	Al Foreman	PTS	8	May 21, 1928	Polo Grounds, New York City, New York, U.S.	
62	Win	54–7–1	Chuck Liddell	NWS	8	Apr 26, 1928	Auditorium, Wilmington, Delaware, U.S.	
61	Win	53–7–1	Al Winkler	PTS	8	Mar 26, 1928	Arena, Philadelphia, Pennsylvania, U.S.	
60	Loss	52–7–1	Pete Nebo	PTS	10	Mar 12, 1928	Arena, Philadelphia, Pennsylvania, U.S.	
59	Win	52–6–1	Jackie Snyder	TKO	7 (10)	Feb 6, 1928	Arena, Philadelphia, Pennsylvania, U.S.	
58	Win	51–6–1	Henri Dewancker	SD	10	Jan 27, 1928	Cambria A.C., Philadelphia, Pennsylvania, U.S.	
57	Win	50–6–1	Bucky Boyle	PTS	10	Jan 2, 1928	Arena, Philadelphia, Pennsylvania, U.S.	
56	Win	49–6–1	Hubert Gillis	PTS	10	Dec 5, 1927	Arena, Philadelphia, Pennsylvania, U.S.	
55	Win	48–6–1	Tommy Gervel	UD	10	Nov 18, 1927	Cambria A.C., Philadelphia, Pennsylvania, U.S.	
54	Loss	47–6–1	Joe Glick	PTS	10	Oct 26, 1927	108th Field Artillery Armory, Philadelphia, Pennsylvania, U.S.	
53	Win	47–5–1	Billy Pop Humphries	PTS	10	Oct 14, 1927	Cambria A.C., Philadelphia, Pennsylvania, U.S.	
52	Win	46–5–1	Tim O'Dowd	PTS	10	Sep 23, 1927	Cambria A.C., Philadelphia, Pennsylvania, U.S.	
51	Win	45–5–1	Johnny Sheppard	PTS	10	Jun 3, 1927	Boger Field, Philadelphia, Pennsylvania, U.S.	
50	Loss	44–5–1	Pete Nebo	NWS	8	May 6, 1927	Convention Hall, Camden, New Jersey, U.S.	
49	Draw	44–4–1	Joey Williams	PTS	10	Apr 22, 1927	Cambria A.C., Philadelphia, Pennsylvania, U.S.	
48	Loss	44–4	Cowboy Eddie Anderson	PTS	10	Mar 21, 1927	Arena, Philadelphia, Pennsylvania, U.S.	
47	Win	44–3	Eddie Ochs	KO	1 (10)	Mar 4, 1927	Cambria A.C., Philadelphia, Pennsylvania, U.S.	
46	Win	43–3	George Siddons	PTS	10	Jan 21, 1927	Cambria A.C., Philadelphia, Pennsylvania, U.S.	
45	Win	42–3	Wilbur Cohen	PTS	10	Dec 25, 1926	Cambria A.C., Philadelphia, Pennsylvania, U.S.	
44	Win	41–3	George Siddons	PTS	10	Dec 3, 1926	Cambria A.C., Philadelphia, Pennsylvania, U.S.	
43	Win	40–3	Ralph Repman	KO	3 (10)	Nov 5, 1926	Cambria A.C., Philadelphia, Pennsylvania, U.S.	
42	Win	39–3	Nick Quagarelli	PTS	10	Oct 18, 1926	Arena, Philadelphia, Pennsylvania, U.S.	
41	Win	38–3	Georges Amblard	PTS	10	Oct 1, 1926	Cambria A.C., Philadelphia, Pennsylvania, U.S.	
40	Win	37–3	Len Brenner	KO	6 (10)	Sep 10, 1926	Cambria A.C., Philadelphia, Pennsylvania, U.S.	
39	Win	36–3	Joey Williams	SD	8	Jul 8, 1926	Carnival Park, West Manayunk, Pennsylvania, U.S.	
38	Win	35–3	Harry Scott	NWS	8	Jul 2, 1926	Bacharach Ball Park, Atlantic City, New Jersey, U.S.	
37	Win	34–3	Young Freddie Welsh	PTS	8	Jun 10, 1926	Carnival Park, West Manayunk, Pennsylvania, U.S.	
36	Win	33–3	Harry Scott	PTS	10	May 21, 1926	Cambria A.C., Philadelphia, Pennsylvania, U.S.	
35	Win	32–3	Pedro Aguinaldo	KO	3 (8)	Apr 23, 1926	Cambria A.C., Philadelphia, Pennsylvania, U.S.	
34	Win	31–3	Joe Souza	PTS	6	Apr 12, 1926	Arena, Philadelphia, Pennsylvania, U.S.	
33	Win	30–3	Harry Scott	PTS	8	Apr 9, 1926	Cambria A.C., Philadelphia, Pennsylvania, U.S.	
32	Win	29–3	Jimmy Burns	PTS	8	Mar 19, 1926	Cambria A.C., Philadelphia, Pennsylvania, U.S.	
31	Win	28–3	Lew Skymer	PTS	8	Feb 26, 1926	Cambria A.C., Philadelphia, Pennsylvania, U.S.	
30	Win	27–3	Young Freddie Welsh	PTS	8	Feb 5, 1926	Cambria A.C., Philadelphia, Pennsylvania, U.S.	
29	Win	26–3	Young Freddie Welsh	UD	8	Jan 22, 1926	Cambria A.C., Philadelphia, Pennsylvania, U.S.	
28	Win	25–3	Steve Nitchie	TKO	8 (8)	Jan 1, 1926	Cambria A.C., Philadelphia, Pennsylvania, U.S.	
27	Win	24–3	Tommy Murray	PTS	10	Nov 26, 1925	Cambria A.C., Philadelphia, Pennsylvania, U.S.	
26	Win	23–3	Jackie Hindle	NWS	8	Nov 5, 1925	Temple Theatre, Camden, New Jersey, U.S.	
25	Win	22–3	Pinky Kaufman	KO	4 (8)	Oct 23, 1925	Cambria A.C., Philadelphia, Pennsylvania, U.S.	
24	Win	21–3	Lew Skymer	PTS	8	Oct 22, 1925	Temple Theater, Camden, New Jersey, U.S.	
23	Win	20–3	Jimmy Burns	PTS	8	Oct 9, 1925	Cambria A.C., Philadelphia, Pennsylvania, U.S.	
22	Win	19–3	Harry Decker	PTS	8	Sep 11, 1925	Cambria A.C., Philadelphia, Pennsylvania, U.S.	
21	Win	18–3	Harry Decker	PTS	8	Aug 3, 1925	Carnival Park, West Manayunk, Pennsylvania, U.S.	
20	Loss	17–3	Battling Mack	NWS	10	Jul 30, 1925	Public Service Ball Park, Camden, New Jersey, U.S.	
19	Win	17–2	Billy Pimpus	PTS	10	Apr 24, 1925	Cambria A.C., Philadelphia, Pennsylvania, U.S.	
18	Win	16–2	Joe Wilton	PTS	6	Apr 3, 1925	Cambria A.C., Philadelphia, Pennsylvania, U.S.	
17	Win	15–2	Billy Hauber	KO	1 (6)	Mar 13, 1925	Cambria A.C., Philadelphia, Pennsylvania, U.S.	
16	Win	14–2	Dave Frey	PTS	6	Feb 20, 1925	Cambria A.C., Philadelphia, Pennsylvania, U.S.	
15	Win	13–2	Leo Reynolds	TKO	6 (6)	Jan 23, 1925	Cambria A.C., Philadelphia, Pennsylvania, U.S.	
14	Win	12–2	Harry Gimbel	PTS	8	Jan 9, 1925	Cambria A.C., Philadelphia, Pennsylvania, U.S.	
13	Win	11–2	Tommy Maher	PTS	6	Dec 25, 1924	Cambria A.C., Philadelphia, Pennsylvania, U.S.	
12	Win	10–2	Kid Apollo	NWS	?	Dec 5, 1924	Armory, Bridgeton, New Jersey, U.S.	
11	Win	9–2	Mickey Birket	DQ	2 (6)	Nov 11, 1924	Midway Auditorium, Philipsburg, Pennsylvania, U.S.	
10	Win	8–2	Sammy Carson	PTS	6	Sep 12, 1924	Cambria A.C., Philadelphia, Pennsylvania, U.S.	
9	Loss	7–2	Jack Metz	NWS	6	Jul 14, 1924	Waltz Dream Arena, Atlantic City, New Jersey, U.S.	
8	Loss	7–1	Steve Nitchie	UD	6	May 12, 1924	Convention Hall, Lancaster, Pennsylvania, U.S.	
7	Win	7–0	Steve Nitchie	PTS	6	Apr 21, 1924	Convention Hall, Lancaster, Pennsylvania, U.S.	
6	Win	6–0	Teddy Squint	UD	6	Apr 8, 1924	Armory, Reading, Pennsylvania, U.S.	
5	Win	5–0	Patsy Togo	NWS	6	Mar 31, 1924	Waltz Dream Arena, Atlantic City, New Jersey, U.S.	
4	Win	4–0	Young Tommy Langdon	PTS	6	Mar 14, 1924	Cambria A.C., Philadelphia, Pennsylvania, U.S.	
3	Win	3–0	Frank Baker	NWS	4	Nov 2, 1923	Cambria A.C., Philadelphia, Pennsylvania, U.S.	
2	Win	2–0	Larry Henderson	TKO	3 (6)	Aug 24, 1923	Logan A.C., Philadelphia, Pennsylvania, U.S.	
1	Win	1–0	Johnny Dougherty	KO	3 (6)	Jul 23, 1923	Logan A.C., Philadelphia, Pennsylvania, U.S.	

== See also ==
- List of light welterweight boxing champions
- List of undisputed boxing champions

Achievements
Preceded by Tony Canzoneri	World Light Welterweight Champion; 18 Mar 1932–20 Feb 1933	Succeeded by Battling Shaw
