= Maxie Berger =

Canadian boxer (1917–2000)

Personal information
- Born: Maxie Berger; February 23, 1917 Montreal, Quebec, Canada
- Died: August 1, 2000 (aged 83) Montreal, Quebec, Canada
- Height: 5 ft 8 in (1.73 m)
- Weight: Lightweight; Welterweight

Boxing career

Boxing record
- Total fights: 131
- Wins: 98
- Win by KO: 25
- Losses: 23
- Draws: 9
- No contests: 1
Medal record
Men's Boxing
Representing Canada
British Empire Games
Silver medal – second place	1934 London	Flyweight

Maxie Berger (February 23, 1917 – August 1, 2000) was a Canadian boxer who fought as a flyweight, junior welterweight, and welterweight from 1935 to 1946. He squared off against many different Hall of Famers including the likes of Sugar Ray Robinson, Ike Williams, Beau Jack, Fritzie Zivic, Midget Wolgast, and Wesley Ramey. He held the Montreal version of the World Jr. Welterweight Title in 1939. His manager was Tommy Dio. Statistical boxing website BoxRec rates Berger as the 14th best Canadian boxer ever across all weight divisions.

== Early life and career ==
Berger was born on February 23, 1917, in Montreal, Quebec, Canada. He began fighting in 1931 at the Montreal Young Men's Hebrew Association (YMHA). After a strong amateur career, Berger was selected as representative for Canada in the 1934 British Empire Games. Fighting as a flyweight, he lost a close decision in the finals to Pat Palmer of England, but managed to win the silver medal. After turning pro in 1935, and winning his first ten bouts, he moved to New York City. Three quarters of his career fights took place in the United States.

On July 6, 1937, Berger topped Midget Wolgast in an eighth round points decision before a crowd of 3,000 at New York's Coney Island Velodrome. Wolgast had held the World Flyweight Championship from 1930 to 1935. Berger floored Wolgast for a nine count in the fourth round with a right to the jaw.

== Professional career highlights ==
=== Canadian Lightweight Champion, 1937 ===
On September 9, 1937, at 133 1/4 pounds, Berger took the Canadian Lightweight championship against Dave Castilloux in a twelve-round points decision at the Forum in Montreal. One month later, he successfully defended the title against Orville Drouillard in a ten-round unanimous decision. Berger took the decision with a rally in the closing rounds to the excitement of an audience just over 2000.

On March 22, 1938, Berger defeated Enrico Venturi in an exciting upset before 12,000 at the New York Coliseum in an eight-round points decision. Venturi, who got in his best shots in the final round, was returning to boxing after a three-month suspension.

==== Bouts against Wesley Ramey ====
On March 28, 1939, Wesley Ramey defeated Berger in their second meeting, an eight-round points decision at the New York Colliseum in the Bronx, New York before an impressive crowd of 10,000. Ramey took five of the eight rounds. In their first meeting on February 21, 1939, Ramey defeated Berger more decisively at the Bronx's Colliseum in an eight-round points decision though Ramey was down for nine counts in the third and fifth rounds. Ramey was able to stage a comeback in the sixth through eighth rounds and win the decision, making the bout all the more memorable to fans.

=== World Jr. Welter Champion, 1939 ===
On July 5, 1939, in Montreal, Quebec, Canada, Berger took the World Junior Welterweight Championship as recognized by the Montreal Athletic Commission before 4000 fans in ten rounds against his former nemesis Wesley Ramey. Berger dropped Ramey in the third, fourth, and seventh rounds though he had lost to him twice previously fighting in the states. Ramey, a veteran of over 200 fights, arose quickly from each knockdown, taking only short counts. At the end of the bout, Ramey had difficulty seeing from the swelling in his right eye.

On September 26, 1939, Berger won over Leonard Del Genio in a crowd pleasing eight round points decision at the New York Coliseum in the Bronx. He had lost to Del Genio on November 11, 1936, in an eight-round points decision at the New York Coliseum. It was a close bout and many in the crowd of 7000 were displeased with the verdict which ruined Berger's nearly perfect win record. Del Genio had an edge in the infighting which was noteworthy since he had a disadvantage of several inches in reach.

On October 29, 1940, Berger defeated Billy Beauhuld in an eight-round points decision before impressed fans at the New York Coliseum in the Bronx. Berger won a decisive points margin in the feature bout extending a streak of twenty matches without a loss. He came out aggressively in the first round opening cuts above Beahhuld's eyes and avenging a loss he took to Beauhuld on February 7, 1938, when Beahuld scored an eight-round points decision against him in St. Nicholas Arena.

Boxing at 143 3/4, on February 3, 1941, Berger defeated Bobby McIntire in an eight-round points decision at the New York's St. Nicholas Arena. He had previously defeated McIntire on two occasions in eight round points decisions on May 7 and June 10, 1940, at the Bronx's New York Colliseum.

=== Loss to Sugar Ray Robinson, 1942 ===
On February 20, 1942, Berger lost to Sugar Ray Robinson before 12,000 excited fans in a second-round TKO at Madison Square Garden. Berger had been sent to the mat twice before the referee intervened and stopped the fight, though many fans felt Berger could have continued the bout. It was Berger's only loss by knockout and one of his few career losses. Berger was first down for a count of seven from a left to the chin, and then went down for the second time from another left by Robinson. The referee stopped the fight after a count of two. It was unfortunate for his legacy that one of his most memorable and well attended bouts for American fans was a loss, even if it was to one of the greatest boxers of all time with one of the longest winning streaks in history.

On February 15, 1944, Berger lost to Beau Jack in a ten-round unanimous points decision at Public Hall in Cleveland, Ohio. In a rather one-sided bout Beau Jack took all but the sixth according to the Associated Press, and lost that only because of dealing a low blow. Berger was down for a two count in the seventh, which was easily Jack's best round.

On January 22, 1945, Berger lost to talented black boxer Ike Williams in a fourth-round knockout, 2:51 into the round, at the Arena in Philadelphia, Pennsylvania before a crowd of 5,451. In the first three rounds, Berger was able to elude Williams's constant barrage of left hooks and right crosses by swiftly stepping away out of reach, but the crowd responded more favorably in the fourth when Williams began to connect with his blows at the urging of the referee for the boxers to make more contact. A left hook by Williams flush to Berger's jaw ended the bout. Berger was nine pounds heavier than his opponent, but Williams conditioning and age of 22 to Berger's 28 probably made more a difference in the bout. The telling blow was to the jaw. Williams became the World Lightweight Champion on August 4, 1947.

=== Life after boxing ===
Berger retired after a sixth-round knockout loss to George Costner in Chicago on March 1, 1946. In a 1972 interview with the Montreal Gazette, Berger claimed he was offered $10,000 by professional gamblers shortly after his last bout to throw a fight with Johnny Greco but refused. After retiring from the ring, he worked for a time as a referee, and later opened a store for men's custom made shirts. He suffered from increasingly severe dementia for the last ten years of his life, until his death in August 2000 in Montreal. He was 83.

== Notable bouts ==
Result	Opponent	Type	Rd., Time	Date	Location	Notes
Loss	(United States) Ike Williams	KO	4 (10)	1945-01-22	(United States) Philadelphia Arena, Philadelphia, Pennsylvania	
Loss	(United States) Beau Jack	UD	10	1944-02-15	(United States) Public Hall, Cleveland, Ohio	
Loss	(United States) Fritzie Zivic	PTS	10	1942-04-13	(United States) Duquesne Gardens, Pittsburgh, Pennsylvania	
Loss	(United States) Sugar Ray Robinson	TKO	2 (12), 1:43	1942-02-20	(United States) Madison Square Garden, New York, New York	
Win	(United States) Wesley Ramey	PTS	8	1939-12-12	(United States) New York Coliseum, Bronx, New York	
Win	(United States) Wesley Ramey	UD	10	1939-07-05	(Canada) Montreal Forum, Montreal, Quebec	Won Montreal Athletic Commission World Jr. Welterweight Title
Loss	(United States) Wesley Ramey	PTS	10	1939-03-28	(United States) New York Coliseum, Bronx, New York	
Loss	(United States) Wesley Ramey	PTS	8	1939-02-21	(United States) New York Coliseum, Bronx, New York	
Win	(United States) Midget Wolgast	PTS	8	1937-07-06	(United States) Coney Island Velodrome, Brooklyn, New York	
Win	(Canada) Dave Castilloux	PTS	12	1937-09-09	(Canada) Montreal Forum, Montreal, Quebec	Won Canadian Lightweight Title

== See also ==
- List of select Jewish boxers
