= Jackie Davis (boxer) =

American boxer (1912–1968)

Personal information
- Born: Herman Davis; November 10, 1912 Cleveland, Ohio, U.S.
- Died: c. December 1968 (aged 56)
- Height: 5 ft 5 1/2 in (166 cm)
- Weight: Welterweight

Boxing career

Boxing record
- Total fights: 122
- Wins: 74
- Win by KO: 15
- Losses: 30
- Draws: 18
Medal record
Men's amateur boxing
Intercity Golden Gloves Second Division
Gold medal – first place	1929 New York City	Featherweight

Jackie Davis (born Herman Davis; November 10, 1912 – December 1968) was an American professional boxer who competed from 1929 to 1935. He was inducted into the Greater Cleveland Sports Hall of Fame in 1986.

== Early life ==
Davis was an orphan.

== Boxing career ==
Fighting out of Chicago and Cleveland throughout his career, Davis was well known for wearing the Star of David symbol on his boxing trunks. As an amateur, he competed in the Chicago Golden Gloves in February 1929. He was outpointed in the final by future three-division world champion Barney Ross, whom he reportedly faced five times as an amateur and would go on to face twice more as a professional. Following this, Davis traveled to New York to compete in the Intercity Golden Gloves, defeating James Quinn to capture the featherweight title in the second division, while Ross won the featherweight title in the first division.

Davis turned professional later that year, winning his first eight bouts before facing Ross again on March 17, 1930, losing by newspaper decision over four rounds. On November 11, Davis knocked out Joe Brown in the fourth round. (Note: A contemporary newspaper reported that Davis stopped Brown in the fifth round.) Two fights later, he faced Billy Gladstone in the first of their three career meetings, losing by decision over four rounds.

Davis faced Ross for the final time on March 20, 1931, losing by decision over six rounds. He then went undefeated in his next 18 bouts, culminating in an eight-round decision victory over Gladstone in a rematch on January 8, 1932. His unbeaten streak came to an end when he was outpointed by Harry Dublinsky over eight rounds in Chicago. On September 7, Davis outpointed Gladstone over six rounds in their third and final meeting.

On October 23, 1933, Davis faced former world lightweight champion Sammy Mandell, outpointing him over ten rounds and dealing a setback to Mandell's comeback attempt. Two fights later, he faced future International Boxing Hall of Fame inductee Cocoa Kid in an eight-round bout. Despite being at a disadvantage in height and reach, Davis overcame the handicap with his aggressive, swarming style, keeping Cocoa Kid on the defensive throughout the contest. Davis rallied in the final round to earn a narrow decision victory by a score of 36–35.

On May 18, 1934, Davis faced future world lightweight champion Lou Ambers, suffering a fourth-round knockout defeat. Four fights later, he faced former world featherweight champion Battling Battalino, losing a razor-thin decision over ten rounds. On November 19, Davis outpointed Ray Napolitano in a viciously contested bout that remained evenly matched through the first four rounds, before his superior boxing and sharper punching in the later rounds secured him the decision victory. Davis then suffered a defeat to Joe Rossi, who was subsequently scheduled to face Napolitano but withdrew at the last minute and was replaced by Davis, who outpointed Napolitano for a second time over eight rounds. Two fights later, Davis earned a narrow decision victory over Tony Falco in a grueling ten-round battle.

After outpointing Rossi in a rematch on January 5, 1935, Davis faced Izzy Jannazzo two fights later on January 26, earning an eight-round decision victory in a hard-fought contest in which his aggressiveness proved decisive. The two met again in an immediate rematch, with Jannazzo outpointing Davis over eight rounds. Having been outpointed by Pete Nebo in their two previous meetings, Davis faced him for a third time on April 9, earning a sixth-round technical knockout victory. In his next bout, Davis earned a ten-round decision victory over Frankie Hughes in Miami Beach, Florida. On September 10, Davis outpointed Napolitano in their third and final meeting.

On December 16, 1935, Davis outpointed Press Johnson over eight rounds in what would be his final professional bout. He retired from professional boxing with a record of 74–30–18, including 15 victories by knockout. Between October 1933 and February 1935, he was ranked among the top ten welterweights by The Ring magazine.

== Later life and death ==
Following his retirement from professional boxing in 1935, Davis worked as a boxing referee until 1968, officiating bouts involving world champions such as Sugar Ray Robinson, Jake LaMotta, and Ezzard Charles. He also served as a boxing columnist for the Cleveland Plain-Dealer and Cleveland News and Press. In December 1968, Davis died in the boxing ring while serving as a referee at a charity event.

== Personal life ==
Davis was Jewish.

== Professional boxing record ==
122 fights	74 wins	30 losses
By knockout	15	1
By decision	59	29
Draws	18	

No.	Result	Record	Opponent	Type	Round, time	Date	Location	Notes
122	Win	74–30–18	Press Johnson	PTS	8	Dec 16, 1935	Public Hall, Cleveland, Ohio, U.S.	
121	Win	73–30–18	Tommy Fagan	KO	2	Nov 25, 1935	Metal Trades Temple, Cleveland, Ohio, U.S.	
120	Win	72–30–18	Ralph Hatchett	KO	4	Oct 21, 1935	Arena, Trenton, New Jersey, U.S.	
119	Loss	71–30–18	George Salvadore	PTS	8	Oct 14, 1935	St. Nicholas Arena, New York City, New York, U.S.	
118	Win	71–29–18	Ralph Fulton	TKO	8	Oct 7, 1935	Arena, Trenton, New Jersey, U.S.	
117	Draw	70–29–18	Joe Pennino	PTS	8	Sep 28, 1935	Ridgewood Grove, Brooklyn, New York, U.S.	
116	Win	70–29–17	Ray Napolitano	PTS	8	Sep 10, 1935	Dexter Park Arena, Woodhaven, Queens, New York, U.S.	
115	Loss	69–29–17	Johnny Bellus	PTS	8	Jul 29, 1935	White City Stadium, West Haven, Connecticut, U.S.	
114	Draw	69–28–17	Nick Pastore	PTS	10	Jul 20, 1935	Walnut Beach Stadium, Milford, Connecticut, U.S.	
113	Win	69–28–16	Joe Pennino	PTS	8	Jul 2, 1935	Coney Island Velodrome, Brooklyn, New York, U.S.	
112	Loss	68–28–16	Ralph Lenny	PTS	10	Jun 24, 1935	South Park Arena, Hartford, Connecticut, U.S.	
111	Win	68–27–16	Tommy Bashara	PTS	10	Jun 6, 1935	Fairview Arena, Norfolk, Virginia, U.S.	
110	Win	67–27–16	Frankie Hughes	PTS	10	May 16, 1935	Beach Arena, Miami Beach, Florida, U.S.	
109	Win	66–27–16	Pete Nebo	TKO	6	Apr 29, 1935	Cinderella Ballroom, Miami, Florida, U.S.	
108	Loss	65–27–16	Johnny Lucas	UD	10	Apr 15, 1935	Cinderella Ballroom, Miami, Florida, U.S.	
107	Loss	65–26–16	Teddy Loder	PTS	8	Mar 23, 1935	Ridgewood Grove, Brooklyn, New York, U.S.	
106	Win	65–25–16	Nick Pastore	PTS	8	Mar 9, 1935	Ridgewood Grove, Brooklyn, New York, U.S.	
105	Loss	64–25–16	Phil Furr	PTS	10	Mar 4, 1935	Auditorium, Washington, D.C., U.S.	
104	Win	64–24–16	Werther Arcelli	PTS	6	Mar 1, 1935	Madison Square Garden, New York City, New York, U.S.	(Note: Although BoxRec and a contemporary news report record it as a draw, Boxerlist.com, fightfax.com, and the New York Times list this bout as a points victory.)
103	Loss	63–24–16	Izzy Jannazzo	PTS	8	Feb 16, 1935	Ridgewood Grove, Brooklyn, New York, U.S.	
102	Win	63–23–16	Izzy Jannazzo	PTS	8	Jan 26, 1935	Ridgewood Grove, Brooklyn, New York, U.S.	
101	Loss	62–23–16	Michele Palermo	PTS	8	Jan 14, 1935	St. Nicholas Arena, New York City, New York, U.S.	
100	Win	62–22–16	Joe Rossi	PTS	8	Jan 5, 1935	Ridgewood Grove, Brooklyn, New York, U.S.	
99	Win	61–22–16	Tony Falco	PTS	10	Dec 14, 1934	Bridgeport, Connecticut, U.S.	
98	Loss	60–22–16	Andy Callahan	PTS	10	Dec 7, 1934	Arena, Boston, Massachusetts, U.S.	
97	Win	60–21–16	Ray Napolitano	PTS	8	Dec 1, 1934	Ridgewood Grove, Brooklyn, New York, U.S.	
96	Loss	59–21–16	Joe Rossi	PTS	8	Nov 26, 1934	St. Nicholas Arena, New York City, New York, U.S.	
95	Win	59–20–16	Ray Napolitano	PTS	8	Nov 19, 1934	St. Nicholas Arena, New York City, New York, U.S.	
94	Draw	58–20–16	Davey Grande	PTS	8	Oct 29, 1934	Odd Fellows' Hall, Albany, New York, U.S.	
93	Win	58–20–15	Tony Scarpati	PTS	6	Oct 20, 1934	Ridgewood Grove, Brooklyn, New York, U.S.	
92	Draw	57–20–15	Eugene Emanuel	PTS	6	Oct 8, 1934	Arena, Syracuse, New York, U.S.	
91	Win	57–20–14	Tommy Romano	PTS	8	Sep 11, 1934	White City Stadium, West Haven, Connecticut, U.S.	
90	Loss	56–20–14	Jimmy Leto	PTS	10	Aug 21, 1934	South Park Arena, Hartford, Connecticut, U.S.	
89	Loss	56–19–14	Battling Battalino	PTS	10	Jul 24, 1934	South Park Arena, Hartford, Connecticut, U.S.	
88	Draw	56–18–14	Joe Vignali	PTS	10	Jul 14, 1934	Walnut Beach Stadium, Milford, Connecticut, U.S.	
87	Win	56–18–13	Frankie Cinque	PTS	10	Jun 29, 1934	White City Stadium, West Haven, Connecticut, U.S.	
86	Draw	55–18–13	Al Casimini	PTS	8	Jun 21, 1934	White City Stadium, West Haven, Connecticut, U.S.	
85	Loss	55–18–12	Lou Ambers	KO	4	May 18, 1934	Rhode Island Auditorium, Providence, Rhode Island, U.S.	
84	Win	55–17–12	Honey Mellody	PTS	10	Apr 30, 1934	Arena, Boston, Massachusetts, U.S.	
83	Win	54–17–12	Buster Brown	UD	10	Apr 2, 1934	Valley Arena, Holyoke, Massachusetts, U.S.	
82	Draw	53–17–12	Billy Bridges	PTS	10	Mar 26, 1934	Valley Arena, Holyoke, Massachusetts, U.S.	
81	Loss	53–17–11	Jimmy Leto	UD	10	Mar 20, 1934	Arena, Boston, Massachusetts, U.S.	
80	Loss	53–16–11	Andy Callahan	PTS	10	Mar 2, 1934	Mechanics Hall, Worcester, Massachusetts, U.S.	
79	Win	53–15–11	Pancho Villa	UD	10	Feb 5, 1934	Arena, Quincy, Massachusetts, U.S.	
78	Draw	52–15–11	Harry Devine	PTS	10	Feb 2, 1934	Mechanics Hall, Worcester, Massachusetts, U.S.	
77	Draw	52–15–10	Steve Halaiko	SD	10	Jan 22, 1934	Convention Hall, Rochester, New York, U.S.	
76	Win	52–15–9	Cocoa Kid	PTS	8	Jan 18, 1934	Arena, New Haven, Connecticut, U.S.	
75	Loss	51–15–9	Frankie Carlton	PTS	10	Nov 20, 1933	Valley Arena, Holyoke, Massachusetts, U.S.	
74	Win	51–14–9	Sammy Mandell	PTS	10	Oct 23, 1933	Public Hall, Cleveland, Ohio, U.S.	
73	Win	50–14–9	Eduardo Duarry	PTS	10	Oct 12, 1933	Erie, Pennsylvania, U.S.	
72	Loss	49–14–9	Wesley Ramey	PTS	10	Sep 26, 1933	Coliseum, Cleveland, Ohio, U.S.	
71	Win	49–13–9	Larry Kaufman	NWS	8	Sep 11, 1933	Punch Bowl, Louisville, Kentucky, U.S.	
70	Win	48–13–9	Frankie Reilly	KO	5	Aug 31, 1933	Fairmont, West Virginia, U.S.	
69	Loss	47–13–9	Tug Phillips	NWS	6	Aug 23, 1933	Idora Park, Youngstown, Ohio, U.S.	
68	Loss	47–12–9	Honeyboy Jones	PTS	6	Aug 9, 1933	Coliseum, Mansfield, Ohio, U.S.	
67	Win	47–11–9	Jackie Elverrillo	PTS	10	Jul 10, 1933	Terre Haute, Indiana, U.S.	
66	Win	46–11–9	Johnny Lamar	KO	3	Jun 30, 1933	Idora Park, Youngstown, Ohio, U.S.	
65	Win	45–11–9	Freddie Fitzgerald	PTS	6	Jun 20, 1933	Public Hall, Cleveland, Ohio, U.S.	
64	Win	44–11–9	Roy Mitchell	PTS	10	Jun 12, 1933	Terre Haute, Indiana, U.S.	
63	Win	43–11–9	Jimmy Columbo	PTS	10	May 26, 1933	Clarksburg, West Virginia, U.S.	
62	Win	42–11–9	Roy Mitchell	TKO	4	May 22, 1933	Terre Haute, Indiana, U.S.	
61	Loss	41–11–9	Chet Smallwood	PTS	6	Apr 29, 1933	Firestone Clubhouse, Akron, Ohio, U.S.	
60	Loss	41–10–9	Freddie Fitzgerald	PTS	8	Apr 19, 1933	Public Hall, Cleveland, Ohio, U.S.	
59	Win	41–9–9	Jimmy Columbo	UD	10	Mar 10, 1933	Northside Arena, Pittsburgh, Pennsylvania, U.S.	
58	Win	40–9–9	Johnny Rich	KO	2	Feb 20, 1933	Euclid Auditorium, Cleveland, Ohio, U.S.	
57	Loss	39–9–9	Sammy O'Dell	PTS	6	Jan 30, 1933	Public Hall, Cleveland, Ohio, U.S.	
56	Win	39–8–9	Jackie Reynolds	KO	1	Jan 17, 1933	Armory, Indianapolis, Indiana, U.S.	
55	Win	38–8–9	Eddie Bojack	PTS	4	Dec 6, 1932	Public Hall, Cleveland, Ohio, U.S.	
54	Draw	37–8–9	Dick Clark	PTS	6	Oct 17, 1932	White City Arena, Chicago, Illinois, U.S.	
53	Win	37–8–8	Danny Delmont	PTS	8	Oct 7, 1932	Rainbo Arena, Chicago, Illinois, U.S.	
52	Win	36–8–8	Billy Gladstone	PTS	6	Sep 7, 1932	Northwest Stadium, Chicago, Illinois, U.S.	
51	Win	35–8–8	Phil McQuillan	PTS	5	Aug 8, 1932	White City Arena, Chicago, Illinois, U.S.	
50	Win	34–8–8	Benny Duke	PTS	6	Jul 14, 1932	Grand Rapids, Michigan, U.S.	
49	Win	33–8–8	Ruben Edman	PTS	8	Jul 4, 1932	Culver Park, Ludington, Michigan, U.S.	
48	Win	32–8–8	Jimmy Leto	PTS	10	Apr 21, 1932	Cinderella Ballroom, Miami, Florida, U.S.	
47	Win	31–8–8	Willard Brown	PTS	10	Apr 5, 1932	Legion Arena, West Palm Beach, Florida, U.S.	
46	Draw	30–8–8	Gus Campbell	PTS	10	Mar 28, 1932	Biscayne Arena, Miami, Florida, U.S.	
45	Loss	30–8–7	Pete Nebo	PTS	10	Mar 7, 1932	Biscayne Arena, Miami, Florida, U.S.	
44	Loss	30–7–7	Pete Nebo	PTS	10	Feb 22, 1932	Biscayne Arena, Miami, Florida, U.S.	
43	Win	30–6–7	Irish Kennedy	PTS	8	Feb 20, 1932	Sault Ste. Marie, Michigan, U.S.	
42	Loss	29–6–7	Harry Dublinsky	PTS	8	Jan 22, 1932	Rainbo Arena, Chicago, Illinois, U.S.	
41	Win	29–5–7	Billy Gladstone	PTS	8	Jan 8, 1932	Rainbo Arena, Chicago, Illinois, U.S.	
40	Win	28–5–7	Benny Duke	PTS	6	Jan 5, 1932	Unknown	
39	Win	27–5–7	Ruben Edman	PTS	8	Jan 1, 1932	Muskegon, Michigan, U.S.	
38	Win	26–5–7	Johnny Rich	PTS	6	Nov 9, 1931	White City Arena, Chicago, Illinois, U.S.	
37	Win	25–5–7	Paddy Walthier	PTS	6	Oct 2, 1931	Eagles Arena, Chicago, Illinois, U.S.	
36	Draw	24–5–7	Dick Sisk	PTS	6	Sep 9, 1931	White City Arena, Chicago, Illinois, U.S.	
35	Win	24–5–6	Meyer Frager	KO	2	Sep 4, 1931	Denemark Stadium, Chicago, Illinois, U.S.	
34	Win	23–5–6	Steve O'Malley	PTS	4	Aug 24, 1931	White City Arena, Chicago, Illinois, U.S.	
33	Win	22–5–6	Marty Fields	PTS	6	Aug 21, 1931	Denemark Stadium, Chicago, Illinois, U.S.	
32	Win	21–5–6	Johnny Panek	PTS	6	Jul 30, 1931	Shewbridge Field, Chicago, Illinois, U.S.	
31	Win	20–5–6	Howard Jones	PTS	8	Jul 16, 1931	Shewbridge Field, Chicago, Illinois, U.S.	
30	Draw	19–5–6	Glen Camp	PTS	8	Jul 2, 1931	Shewbridge Field, Chicago, Illinois, U.S.	
29	Draw	19–5–5	Glen Camp	PTS	8	Jun 18, 1931	Shewbridge Field, Chicago, Illinois, U.S.	
28	Win	19–5–4	Jimmy Hackley	KO	2	May 29, 1931	Cicero Stadium, Cicero, Illinois, U.S.	
27	Win	18–5–4	Al Reis	PTS	6	May 20, 1931	Cicero Stadium, Cicero, Illinois, U.S.	
26	Win	17–5–4	Paddy Walthier	PTS	8	Apr 27, 1931	White City Arena, Chicago, Illinois, U.S.	
25	Win	16–5–4	Eddie Black	PTS	8	Apr 9, 1931	Armory B, Oshkosh, Wisconsin, U.S.	
24	Draw	15–5–4	Al Reis	PTS	6	Mar 27, 1931	Avalon Ballroom, La Crosse, Wisconsin, U.S.	
23	Loss	15–5–3	Barney Ross	PTS	6	Mar 20, 1931	Cicero Stadium, Cicero, Illinois, U.S.	
22	Win	15–4–3	Al Reis	PTS	8	Mar 7, 1931	Janesville, Wisconsin, U.S.	
21	Draw	14–4–3	Eddie Black	PTS	8	Mar 5, 1931	Armory B, Oshkosh, Wisconsin, U.S.	
20	Loss	14–4–2	Joey Freeman	PTS	6	Feb 16, 1931	White City Arena, Chicago, Illinois, U.S.	
19	Win	14–3–2	Marty Fields	PTS	6	Feb 5, 1931	Unknown	
18	Loss	13–3–2	Harry Devine	PTS	6	Jan 30, 1931	Cicero Stadium, Cicero, Illinois, U.S.	
17	Draw	13–2–2	Irwin Berndt	PTS	4	Jan 23, 1931	Auditorium, Milwaukee, Wisconsin, U.S.	
16	Win	13–2–1	Lou Vine	PTS	?	Jan 15, 1931	Unknown	
15	Win	12–2–1	Carl Johnson	KO	6	Jan 5, 1931	White City Arena, Chicago, Illinois, U.S.	
14	Loss	11–2–1	Billy Gladstone	PTS	6	Dec 30, 1930	Coliseum, Chicago, Illinois, U.S.	
13	Draw	11–1–1	Charlie Crocker	PTS	6	Dec 8, 1930	White City Arena, Chicago, Illinois, U.S.	
12	Win	11–1–0	Joe Brown	KO	4	Nov 3, 1930	Englewood Arena, Chicago, Illinois, U.S.	
11	Win	10–1–0	Billy Kenny	PTS	6	Oct 20, 1930	Englewood Arena, Chicago, Illinois, U.S.	
10	Win	9–1–0	Edgar Terry	PTS	4	Apr 17, 1930	Springfield, Illinois, U.S.	
9	Loss	8–1–0	Barney Ross	NWS	4	Mar 17, 1930	Arena, St. Louis, Missouri, U.S.	
8	Win	8–0–0	Young Geno	PTS	6	Mar 13, 1930	Peoria, Illinois, U.S.	
7	Win	7–0–0	Billy Rothermel	KO	1	Feb 25, 1930	Coliseum, St. Louis, Missouri, U.S.	
6	Win	6–0–0	Roy Logsdon	PTS	6	Feb 20, 1930	Springfield, Illinois, U.S.	
5	Win	5–0–0	Edgar Terry	PTS	6	Jan 30, 1930	Unknown	
4	Win	4–0–0	Young Geno	PTS	6	Jan 25, 1930	Unknown	
3	Win	3–0–0	Rip Wilson	PTS	6	Jan 15, 1930	Unknown	
2	Win	2–0–0	Elmer Heitzman	KO	2	Jan 8, 1930	Springfield, Illinois, U.S.	
1	Win	1–0–0	Roy Logsdon	PTS	6	Dec 5, 1929	Springfield, Illinois, U.S.	

== See also ==
- List of male boxers
