= Harry Dublinsky =

American boxer (1910–1977)

Personal information
- Born: Harry Thomas Dublinski; September 3, 1910 Wisconsin, U.S.
- Died: April 1977 (aged c. 66)
- Height: 5 ft 7 in (170 cm)
- Weight: Lightweight; Welterweight

Boxing career

Boxing record
- Total fights: 147
- Wins: 88
- Win by KO: 19
- Losses: 41
- Draws: 18

Harry Dublinsky (born Harry Thomas Dublinski; September 3, 1910 – April 1977) was an American professional boxer who competed from 1926 to 1936. He was ranked the No. 1 welterweight contender in the world by The Ring magazine in September 1934.

== Boxing career ==
Dublinsky began his professional boxing career as a lightweight in 1926 at the age of 16, compiling a record of 40–11–8 in his first 59 bouts. On November 21, 1930, Dublinsky fought future three-division world champion Barney Ross to an eight-round draw.

On January 26, 1931, Dublinsky faced Tommy Grogan in the first of three career meetings between the two. Following three slow opening rounds, Dublinsky landed a hard right to Grogan's head, but Grogan countered with a left hook that floored Dublinsky for a count of two. By the sixth round, Dublinsky was bleeding from a cut above his right eye. Despite a determined effort to make up lost ground in the final two rounds, Dublinsky was outpointed by a wide margin. On April 9, Dublinsky lost to Roger Bernard in the first of their three career meetings, before avenging the defeat with a points victory in their rematch two weeks later. Dublinsky next faced Grogan in a rematch on May 8, outpointing him over eight rounds. On June 26, Dublinsky faced Bernard for the third and final time, outpointing him over ten rounds. On November 4, Dublinsky faced former world featherweight champion Louis "Kid" Kaplan, suffering a knockdown for a count of five in the third round before losing by decision over eight rounds.

On January 22, 1932, Dublinsky outpointed Jackie Davis over eight rounds. Two fights later, on February 8, Dublinsky faced reigning NBA light welterweight champion Johnny Jadick in a non-title bout, earning a ten-round decision victory. On March 17, Dublinsky faced Grogan for the third and final time in a rubber match. By the sixth round, Grogan was visibly exhausted from Dublinsky's sustained attacks to the head and body. Dublinsky dominated the ten-round contest, winning every round except the final one. Two fights later, on May 25, Dublinsky faced former NBA featherweight and world super featherweight champion Benny Bass in a ten-round bout. Bass fought wildly in the early rounds, while Dublinsky circled his opponent, presenting a difficult target and repeatedly connecting with long lefts that did little to trouble Bass. However, Bass began finding his mark in the later rounds, nearly closing one of Dublinsky's eyes with a left hook after the eighth round. Dublinsky ultimately lost by split decision. On June 16, Dublinsky faced reigning world lightweight champion and three-division world champion Tony Canzoneri in a non-title bout, marking the first of their three career meetings. Dublinsky lost by split decision after ten rounds. On September 27, Dublinsky faced Tracy Cox in the first of their four career meetings, earning a split decision victory before losing by decision in their rematch on November 29.

On February 6, 1933, Dublinsky faced Tony Falco, losing by majority decision after ten rounds. On July 3, Dublinsky faced former world light welterweight champion Battling Shaw, earning a ten-round unanimous decision victory. On August 7, Dublinsky faced Charlie Baxter in a scheduled ten-round bout, dominating the opening three rounds with a relentless barrage of punches before securing a technical knockout victory in the fourth.

On February 16, 1934, Dublinsky faced Cox in their third meeting, reportedly giving him "a boxing lesson" en route to a ten-round decision victory. Dublinsky was scheduled to face Canzoneri in a rematch on August 22, 1934, but the bout was postponed until August 29 to allow Canzoneri additional time to recover fully from a leg injury. Entering the bout as a 3–1 underdog, Dublinsky was nearly knocked down in the opening round and resorted to desperate clinching in the second to avoid Canzoneri's powerful blows. However, he rallied in the third round and steadily gained momentum as the fight progressed. In the sixth round, Dublinsky opened a cut beside Canzoneri's right eye and repeatedly targeted the injury throughout the remaining rounds, ultimately earning a ten-round decision victory. In his next fight, Dublinsky faced Canzoneri for the third and final time in a rubber match. A victory would have positioned Dublinsky as the No. 1 contender for Jimmy McLarnin's world welterweight title, and he entered the bout as a 6–5 favorite. After being thoroughly outboxed in the early rounds, Dublinsky began wearing Canzoneri down with lefts and rights to the body in the sixth round and opened a deep cut on his opponent's lip in the ninth. However, Canzoneri rallied strongly in the tenth and final round, ultimately handing Dublinsky a decision defeat. Dublinsky next faced Bobby Pacho on October 15, with Pacho opening a cut near Dublinsky's left eye in the fourth round. Dublinsky responded by opening a small cut above Pacho's left eye in the seventh. In the tenth and final round, Pacho sent Dublinsky reeling against the ropes, but Dublinsky rallied in the closing minute to secure a draw. Dublinsky next faced former world super featherweight champion Frankie Klick on November 2 at Madison Square Garden. In an action-packed contest that thrilled the crowd, Klick attacked aggressively from the opening bell, dominating the first four rounds with relentless pressure and accurate punching. Dublinsky rallied in the fifth round, outboxing Klick from long range, but Klick regained control over the next two rounds to extend his lead. Although Dublinsky narrowly won the final three rounds, his late rally proved insufficient, as both judges awarded the decision to Klick, while referee Tommy McEvoy scored the bout in Dublinsky's favor. Dublinsky next faced Falco in a rematch on November 23, overcoming his opponent's persistent clinching to force a hard-fought, action-packed contest and earn a decisive points victory. On December 7, Dublinsky faced Cox for the fourth and final time, with their ten-round bout ending in a draw.

On January 11, 1935, Dublinsky faced future world lightweight champion Lou Ambers, having suffered from an illness in the week leading up to the bout. Ambers gained a slight advantage over the first two rounds, but Dublinsky responded by winning the fourth, sixth, and seventh rounds while fighting on even terms in the third and fifth, repeatedly connecting with light rights to Ambers' head. However, Dublinsky appeared to lack his usual stamina, allowing Ambers to mount a strong rally in the later rounds and secure a unanimous decision victory. On September 16, Dublinsky faced Izzy Jannazzo, who established an early lead with a relentless two-fisted attack over the first three rounds. Dublinsky rallied to even the contest, with both fighters exchanging blows throughout the remaining rounds before the bout was ultimately declared a draw. Two fights later, on October 21, Dublinsky faced Jannazzo in a rematch, establishing an early lead by repeatedly connecting with long lefts. Despite bleeding from the nose and mouth by the fifth round, Jannazzo mounted a comeback, rallying strongly in the ninth and tenth rounds to even the contest, which was once again declared a draw.

On December 2, 1936, Dublinsky faced future world welterweight champion Fritzie Zivic, amid reports that he intended to announce his retirement following the bout. Zivic launched a relentless attack in the opening round, flooring Dublinsky with a powerful right hand. Dublinsky was knocked down twice more in the fourth round before his corner threw in the towel in the sixth, giving Zivic a technical knockout victory. In his final professional bout on December 16, Dublinsky faced reigning Canadian welterweight champion Gordon Wallace, who floored him for seven-counts in both the third and fourth rounds. Wallace knocked Dublinsky down again for a six-count in the fifth round before sending him to the canvas once more for the full ten-count, marking the first and only time Dublinsky was counted out in his professional career.

Dublinsky retired from professional boxing in 1936 with a record of 88–41–18, including 19 victories by knockout. Between January 1931 and January 1936, he was ranked among the top ten contenders in both the lightweight and welterweight divisions by The Ring magazine, peaking at No. 5 in the world at lightweight in March 1932 and No. 1 at welterweight in September 1934.

== Personal life ==
Dublinsky was of Polish-Jewish descent. Dublinsky had 20 siblings and was the only member of his 23-person immediate family to pursue a career in professional boxing.

== Professional boxing record ==
147 fights	88 wins	41 losses
By knockout	19	4
By decision	69	37
Draws	18	

No.	Result	Record	Opponent	Type	Round, time	Date	Location	Notes
147	Loss	88–41–18	Gordon Wallace	KO	5	Dec 16, 1936	Vancouver, British Columbia, Canada	
146	Loss	88–40–18	Fritzie Zivic	TKO	6	Dec 2, 1936	Motor Square Garden, Pittsburgh, Pennsylvania, U.S.	
145	Draw	88–39–18	Frankie Sagilio	PTS	10	Nov 23, 1936	Marigold Gardens, Chicago, Illinois, U.S.	
144	Loss	88–39–17	Milt Aron	MD	10	Nov 6, 1936	Chicago Stadium, Chicago, Illinois, U.S.	
143	Draw	88–38–17	Milt Aron	MD	10	Oct 13, 1936	Chicago Stadium, Chicago, Illinois, U.S.	
142	Loss	88–38–16	Frankie Blair	UD	10	Jun 29, 1936	Griffith Stadium, Washington, D.C., U.S.	
141	Draw	88–37–16	Phil Furr	SD	10	May 25, 1936	Griffith Stadium, Washington, D.C., U.S.	
140	Loss	88–37–15	Chief Parris	PTS	10	Mar 13, 1936	Steer Stadium, Dallas, Texas, U.S.	
139	Loss	88–36–15	Billy Celebron	TKO	8	Feb 19, 1936	Cicero Stadium, Cicero, Illinois, U.S.	
138	Win	88–35–15	Jimmy Leto	PTS	10	Nov 18, 1935	St. Nicholas Arena, New York City, New York, U.S.	
137	Draw	87–35–15	Izzy Jannazzo	PTS	10	Oct 21, 1935	St. Nicholas Arena, New York City, New York, U.S.	
136	Loss	87–35–14	Jimmy Leto	PTS	10	Sep 30, 1935	St. Nicholas Arena, New York City, New York, U.S.	
135	Draw	87–34–14	Izzy Jannazzo	PTS	10	Sep 16, 1935	St. Nicholas Arena, New York City, New York, U.S.	
134	Loss	87–34–13	Cleto Locatelli	PTS	10	Aug 6, 1935	Coney Island Velodrome, Brooklyn, New York, U.S.	
133	Win	87–33–13	Bobby Wilson	KO	1	Jul 15, 1935	Griffith Stadium, Washington, D.C., U.S.	
132	Win	86–33–13	Joe Rossi	PTS	10	Jul 2, 1935	Coney Island Velodrome, Brooklyn, New York, U.S.	
131	Loss	85–33–13	George Salvadore	UD	10	Jun 3, 1935	Coliseum Arena, New Orleans, Louisiana, U.S.	
130	Win	85–32–13	Eddie Wolfe	UD	10	May 6, 1935	Coliseum Arena, New Orleans, Louisiana, U.S.	
129	Loss	84–32–13	Lou Ambers	UD	10	Jan 11, 1935	Madison Square Garden, New York City, New York, U.S.	
128	Draw	84–31–13	Tracy Cox	PTS	10	Dec 7, 1934	Fair Park Arena, Dallas, Texas, U.S.	
127	Win	84–31–12	Tony Falco	PTS	10	Nov 23, 1934	Madison Square Garden, New York City, New York, U.S.	
126	Loss	83–31–12	Frankie Klick	SD	10	Nov 2, 1934	Madison Square Garden, New York City, New York, U.S.	
125	Draw	83–30–12	Bobby Pacho	PTS	10	Oct 15, 1934	Arena, Philadelphia, Pennsylvania, U.S.	
124	Loss	83–30–11	Tony Canzoneri	PTS	10	Sep 26, 1934	Ebbets Field, Brooklyn, New York, U.S.	
123	Win	83–29–11	Tony Canzoneri	PTS	10	Aug 29, 1934	Ebbets Field, Brooklyn, New York, U.S.	
122	Win	82–29–11	Steve Halaiko	TKO	10	Jul 18, 1934	Wrigley Field, Chicago, Illinois, U.S.	
121	Win	81–29–11	Jimmy Leto	SD	10	Jul 11, 1934	Ebbets Field, Brooklyn, New York, U.S.	
120	Win	80–29–11	Billy Hogan	PTS	10	Jun 28, 1934	Ebbets Field, Brooklyn, New York, U.S.	
119	Win	79–29–11	Dominic Mancini	UD	10	May 21, 1934	Hickey Park, Millvale, Pennsylvania, U.S.	
118	Draw	78–29–11	Eddie Wolfe	PTS	10	May 15, 1934	Memphis, Tennessee, U.S.	
117	Win	78–29–10	Ritchie Mack	PTS	10	Apr 16, 1934	Coliseum Arena, New Orleans, Louisiana, U.S.	
116	Win	77–29–10	Frankie Carlton	TKO	6	Apr 2, 1934	Arena, Philadelphia, Pennsylvania, U.S.	
115	Win	76–29–10	Ervin Berlier	KO	5	Mar 12, 1934	Coliseum Arena, New Orleans, Louisiana, U.S.	
114	Win	75–29–10	Billy Hogan	PTS	10	Mar 5, 1934	Coliseum Arena, New Orleans, Louisiana, U.S.	
113	Loss	74–29–10	Eddie Wolfe	PTS	10	Feb 28, 1934	Memphis, Tennessee, U.S.	
112	Win	74–28–10	Tracy Cox	PTS	10	Feb 16, 1934	Chicago Stadium, Chicago, Illinois, U.S.	
111	Win	73–28–10	Eddie Wolfe	PTS	10	Feb 5, 1934	Coliseum Arena, New Orleans, Louisiana, U.S.	
110	Loss	72–28–10	Wesley Ramey	PTS	10	Nov 23, 1933	Auditorium, Milwaukee, Wisconsin, U.S.	
109	Loss	72–27–10	Eddie Cool	PTS	10	Oct 11, 1933	Armory, Detroit, Michigan, U.S.	
108	Win	72–26–10	Jackie Elverrillo	PTS	10	Sep 8, 1933	Cicero Stadium, Cicero, Illinois, U.S.	
107	Win	71–26–10	Frank Bojarski	TKO	7	Aug 18, 1933	Erie Stadium, Erie, Pennsylvania, U.S.	
106	Win	70–26–10	Charlie Baxter	TKO	4	Aug 7, 1933	Hickey Park, Millvale, Pennsylvania, U.S.	
105	Win	69–26–10	Pete Petroskey	PTS	10	Jul 18, 1933	Muskegon, Michigan, U.S.	
104	Win	68–26–10	Battling Shaw	UD	10	Jul 3, 1933	Coliseum Arena, New Orleans, Louisiana, U.S.	
103	Loss	67–26–10	Wesley Ramey	MD	10	May 19, 1933	Northside Arena, Pittsburgh, Pennsylvania, U.S.	
102	Win	67–25–10	Danny Delmont	PTS	8	Apr 28, 1933	Cicero Stadium, Cicero, Illinois, U.S.	
101	Win	66–25–10	Wildcat O'Connor	MD	10	Mar 20, 1933	Town Hall, Scranton, Pennsylvania, U.S.	
100	Win	65–25–10	Young Joe Firpo	PTS	8	Mar 7, 1933	Olympia A.C., Philadelphia, Pennsylvania, U.S.	
99	Loss	64–25–10	Eddie Cool	MD	10	Feb 20, 1933	Arena, Philadelphia, Pennsylvania, U.S.	
98	Loss	64–24–10	Tony Falco	MD	10	Feb 6, 1933	Motor Square Garden, Pittsburgh, Pennsylvania, U.S.	
97	Win	64–23–10	Eddie Cool	PTS	10	Jan 30, 1933	Arena, Philadelphia, Pennsylvania, U.S.	
96	Win	63–23–10	Lou Terry	PTS	10	Jan 24, 1933	Arena, St. Louis, Missouri, U.S.	
95	Win	62–23–10	Frank Bojarski	TKO	8	Jan 16, 1933	Motor Square Garden, Pittsburgh, Pennsylvania, U.S.	
94	Win	61–23–10	Prince Saunders	PTS	10	Jan 2, 1933	Cicero Stadium, Cicero, Illinois, U.S.	
93	Loss	60–23–10	Willard Brown	MD	10	Dec 15, 1932	Armory, Muncie, Indiana, U.S.	
92	Loss	60–22–10	Tracy Cox	PTS	10	Nov 29, 1932	Armory, Indianapolis, Indiana, U.S.	
91	Win	60–21–10	Hershie Wilson	PTS	10	Nov 1, 1932	Armory, Indianapolis, Indiana, U.S.	
90	Win	59–21–10	Tracy Cox	SD	10	Sep 27, 1932	Perry Stadium, Indianapolis, Indiana, U.S.	
89	Loss	58–21–10	Andy Callahan	PTS	8	Aug 31, 1932	Chicago Stadium, Chicago, Illinois, U.S.	
88	Win	58–20–10	Herman Perlick	TKO	9	Jul 28, 1932	Sparta Stadium, Chicago, Illinois, U.S.	
87	Loss	57–20–10	Tony Canzoneri	SD	10	Jun 16, 1932	Sparta Stadium, Chicago, Illinois, U.S.	
86	Loss	57–19–10	Benny Bass	SD	10	May 25, 1932	Arena Stadium, Philadelphia, Pennsylvania, U.S.	
85	Loss	57–18–10	Lew Massey	TKO	4	Mar 28, 1932	Arena, Philadelphia, Pennsylvania, U.S.	
84	Win	57–17–10	Tommy Grogan	NWS	10	Mar 17, 1932	Auditorium, Saint Paul, Minnesota, U.S.	
83	Draw	56–17–10	Young Joe Firpo	PTS	10	Feb 29, 1932	Arena, Philadelphia, Pennsylvania, U.S.	
82	Win	56–17–9	Johnny Jadick	MD	10	Feb 8, 1932	Arena, Philadelphia, Pennsylvania, U.S.	
81	Win	55–17–9	Prince Saunders	NWS	10	Jan 25, 1932	Saint Paul, Minnesota, U.S.	
80	Win	54–17–9	Jackie Davis	PTS	8	Jan 22, 1932	Rainbo Arena, Chicago, Illinois, U.S.	
79	Loss	53–17–9	Jackie King	PTS	10	Jan 12, 1932	Armory, Indianapolis, Indiana, U.S.	
78	Win	53–16–9	Pee Wee Jarrell	PTS	10	Jan 5, 1932	Elks Temple, Niles, Michigan, U.S.	
77	Loss	52–16–9	Louis 'Kid' Kaplan	PTS	8	Nov 4, 1931	Chicago Stadium, Chicago, Illinois, U.S.	
76	Loss	52–15–9	Mickey Cohen	UD	10	Oct 8, 1931	Denver, Colorado, U.S.	
75	Win	52–14–9	Eddie Koppy	TKO	7	Sep 4, 1931	Denemark Stadium, Chicago, Illinois, U.S.	
74	Win	51–14–9	Orrie Mosher	PTS	10	Aug 25, 1931	Marsh Field, Muskegon, Michigan, U.S.	
73	Win	50–14–9	Roger Bernard	PTS	10	Jun 26, 1931	Borchert Field, Milwaukee, Wisconsin, U.S.	
72	Win	49–14–9	Mickey Cohen	PTS	10	Jun 4, 1931	Auditorium, Milwaukee, Wisconsin, U.S.	
71	Win	48–14–9	Eddie Wagner	TKO	2	May 28, 1931	Columbus Community Club, Green Bay, Wisconsin, U.S.	
70	Win	47–14–9	Jimmy Munsell	KO	2	May 18, 1931	White City Arena, Chicago, Illinois, U.S.	
69	Win	46–14–9	Tommy Grogan	PTS	8	May 8, 1931	Chicago Stadium, Chicago, Illinois, U.S.	
68	Win	45–14–9	Roger Bernard	PTS	8	Apr 24, 1931	Chicago Stadium, Chicago, Illinois, U.S.	
67	Win	44–14–9	Benny Duke	KO	5	Apr 17, 1931	Columbus Community Club, Green Bay, Wisconsin, U.S.	
66	Loss	43–14–9	Roger Bernard	PTS	10	Apr 9, 1931	Auditorium, Milwaukee, Wisconsin, U.S.	
65	Loss	43–13–9	Wesley Ramey	PTS	10	Feb 18, 1931	Grand Rapids, Michigan, U.S.	
64	Loss	43–12–9	Tommy Grogan	PTS	10	Jan 26, 1931	Olympia Stadium, Detroit, Michigan, U.S.	
63	Win	43–11–9	Bruce Flowers	PTS	10	Jan 1, 1931	Auditorium, Milwaukee, Wisconsin, U.S.	
62	Win	42–11–9	Mickey O'Neill	DQ	8	Dec 8, 1930	Auditorium, Milwaukee, Wisconsin, U.S.	
61	Win	41–11–9	Joe Azzarella	KO	4	Dec 1, 1930	Riverview Rink, Milwaukee, Wisconsin, U.S.	
60	Draw	40–11–9	Barney Ross	PTS	8	Nov 21, 1930	Chicago Stadium, Chicago, Illinois, U.S.	
59	Win	40–11–8	Fred Tompkins	PTS	8	Nov 10, 1930	Riverview Rink, Milwaukee, Wisconsin, U.S.	
58	Win	39–11–8	Sammy Caruso	TKO	5	Oct 29, 1930	Grand Rapids, Michigan, U.S.	
57	Loss	38–11–8	Wesley Ramey	PTS	10	Jul 30, 1930	Island Park, Grand Rapids, Michigan, U.S.	
56	Loss	38–10–8	Tony Herrera	PTS	10	Jul 1, 1930	Michigan State Fairgrounds, Detroit, Michigan, U.S.	
55	Win	38–9–8	Nick Ellenwood	KO	10	May 21, 1930	Kalamazoo, Michigan, U.S.	
54	Win	37–9–8	Herman Wallace	TKO	8	Apr 21, 1930	Flint, Michigan, U.S.	
53	Win	36–9–8	Benny Duke	PTS	10	Mar 26, 1930	Danceland Arena, Detroit, Michigan, U.S.	
52	Win	35–9–8	Emory Cabana	PTS	8	Mar 14, 1930	Chicago Stadium, Chicago, Illinois, U.S.	
51	Win	34–9–8	Herman Perlick	PTS	10	Feb 28, 1930	Olympia Stadium, Detroit, Michigan, U.S.	
50	Win	33–9–8	Ted Henry	PTS	6	Feb 17, 1930	Ashland Blvd. Auditorium, Chicago, Illinois, U.S.	
49	Win	32–9–8	Dick Landeg	PTS	6	Feb 14, 1930	Olympia Stadium, Detroit, Michigan, U.S.	
48	Win	31–9–8	Jimmy Hackley	PTS	6	Jan 24, 1930	Chicago Stadium, Chicago, Illinois, U.S.	
47	Win	30–9–8	Ray Kiser	PTS	7	Jan 13, 1930	White City Arena, Chicago, Illinois, U.S.	
46	Win	29–9–8	Benny Golden	PTS	5	Dec 27, 1929	Chicago Stadium, Chicago, Illinois, U.S.	
45	Win	28–9–8	Tony Caragliano	PTS	6	Nov 4, 1929	Chicago Stadium, Chicago, Illinois, U.S.	
44	Draw	27–9–8	Benny Golden	PTS	8	Oct 10, 1929	Auditorium, Milwaukee, Wisconsin, U.S.	
43	Win	27–9–7	Danny Delmont	PTS	5	Oct 2, 1929	Coliseum, Chicago, Illinois, U.S.	
42	Win	26–9–7	Irwin Berndt	NWS	8	Sep 19, 1929	Mueller's Athletic Field, Milwaukee, Wisconsin, U.S.	
41	Loss	25–9–7	Al Greenfield	PTS	10	Jul 18, 1929	Mills Stadium, Chicago, Illinois, U.S.	
40	Win	25–8–7	Frankie Ferro	NWS	10	Jun 4, 1929	Fort Benjamin Harrison, Lawrence, Indiana, U.S.	
39	Loss	24–8–7	Jackie Dugan	NWS	10	May 17, 1929	Jefferson County Armory, Louisville, Kentucky, U.S.	
38	Win	24–7–7	Henry Falegano	NWS	8	May 3, 1929	Coliseum, Des Moines, Iowa, U.S.	
37	Win	23–7–7	Lou Avery	PTS	6	Apr 23, 1929	Hippodrome, Chicago, Illinois, U.S.	
36	Loss	22–7–7	Louis New	NWS	8	Apr 2, 1929	Arcadia Ballroom, Milwaukee, Wisconsin, U.S.	
35	Draw	22–6–7	Louis New	NWS	8	Feb 25, 1929	Auditorium, Milwaukee, Wisconsin, U.S.	
34	Loss	22–6–6	Spud Murphy	PTS	6	Feb 6, 1929	Coliseum, Chicago, Illinois, U.S.	
33	Loss	22–5–6	Al Greenfield	PTS	10	Dec 3, 1928	White City Arena, Chicago, Illinois, U.S.	
32	Win	22–4–6	Henry Lenard	PTS	8	Nov 26, 1928	White City Arena, Chicago, Illinois, U.S.	
31	Loss	21–4–6	Ignacio Fernandez	PTS	10	Oct 26, 1928	Legion Stadium, Hollywood, California, U.S.	
30	Win	21–3–6	Joe Shellman	PTS	6	Jul 25, 1928	American Giants Baseball Park, Chicago, Illinois, U.S.	
29	Draw	20–3–6	Cecil Como	PTS	5	Jul 12, 1928	Mills Stadium, Chicago, Illinois, U.S.	
28	Win	20–3–5	Eddie Connors	PTS	6	Jun 4, 1928	White City Arena, Chicago, Illinois, U.S.	
27	Win	19–3–5	Earl Mastro	PTS	6	May 24, 1928	Mills Stadium, Chicago, Illinois, U.S.	
26	Draw	18–3–5	Paddy Walthier	PTS	6	May 3, 1928	Ashland Blvd. Auditorium, Chicago, Illinois, U.S.	
25	Win	18–3–4	Jimmy Mahoney	TKO	1	Apr 19, 1928	Knights of Columbus Hall, Chicago, Illinois, U.S.	
24	Win	17–3–4	Johnny Hopfinger	PTS	6	Mar 19, 1928	White City Arena, Chicago, Illinois, U.S.	
23	Draw	16–3–4	Frankie Bauman	PTS	5	Feb 23, 1928	Coliseum, Chicago, Illinois, U.S.	
22	Win	16–3–3	Cozy Dolan	KO	3	Feb 16, 1928	Ashland Blvd. Auditorium, Chicago, Illinois, U.S.	
21	Win	15–3–3	Billy Knowles	PTS	4	Jan 30, 1928	White City Arena, Chicago, Illinois, U.S.	
20	Win	14–3–3	Cozy Dolan	PTS	6	Nov 21, 1927	White City Arena, Chicago, Illinois, U.S.	
19	Win	13–3–3	Frankie Hall	PTS	6	Nov 10, 1927	Logan Square Baseball Park, Chicago, Illinois, U.S.	
18	Win	12–3–3	Dominic Colucci	PTS	6	Oct 25, 1927	Ashland Blvd. Auditorium, Chicago, Illinois, U.S.	
17	Win	11–3–3	Eddie Law	PTS	4	Oct 17, 1927	White City Arena, Chicago, Illinois, U.S.	
16	Win	10–3–3	Genaro Pino	PTS	4	Sep 16, 1927	Mills Stadium, Chicago, Illinois, U.S.	
15	Win	9–3–3	Harry Fierro	PTS	6	Sep 2, 1927	Mills Stadium, Chicago, Illinois, U.S.	
14	Win	8–3–3	Charley Genaro	PTS	4	Jul 4, 1927	Comiskey Park, Chicago, Illinois, U.S.	
13	Win	7–3–3	Harry Fierro	PTS	4	Jun 17, 1927	Logan Square Baseball Park, Chicago, Illinois, U.S.	
12	Win	6–3–3	Ted Velie	PTS	4	Jun 7, 1927	Logan Square Baseball Park, Chicago, Illinois, U.S.	
11	Draw	5–3–3	Johnny Caserio	PTS	4	Apr 25, 1927	White City Arena, Chicago, Illinois, U.S.	
10	Loss	5–3–2	Johnny Caserio	PTS	4	Mar 21, 1927	White City Arena, Chicago, Illinois, U.S.	
9	Win	5–2–2	Jimmy Angelo	PTS	4	Feb 18, 1927	Roosevelt Road A.C., Chicago, Illinois, U.S.	
8	Win	4–2–2	Pete Sorelli	KO	2	Jan 25, 1927	Roosevelt Road A.C., Chicago, Illinois, U.S.	
7	Loss	3–2–2	Earl Mastro	PTS	4	Dec 17, 1926	Ashland Blvd. Auditorium, Chicago, Illinois, U.S.	
6	Draw	3–1–2	Bobby Allen	PTS	4	Nov 22, 1926	Coliseum, Chicago, Illinois, U.S.	
5	Loss	3–1–1	Henry Cullen	PTS	4	Oct 25, 1926	White City Arena, Chicago, Illinois, U.S.	
4	Win	3–0–1	Joey Weiss	PTS	4	Oct 11, 1926	White City Arena, Chicago, Illinois, U.S.	
3	Win	2–0–1	Vito Cione	PTS	4	Sep 29, 1926	Cermak Park, Chicago, Illinois, U.S.	
2	Win	1–0–1	Henry Cullen	PTS	4	Aug 30, 1926	Comiskey Park, Chicago, Illinois, U.S.	
1	Draw	0–0–1	Harry Collier	PTS	4	Aug 26, 1926	Mills Stadium, Chicago, Illinois, U.S.	

== See also ==
- List of male boxers
