= Roger Bernard =

American boxer (1907–1954)

Personal information
- Nickname: The Uncrowned Champion of the Featherweights
- Born: Orazio Bernardi; June 6, 1907 Chicago, Illinois, U.S.
- Died: September 17, 1954 (aged 47) Flint, Michigan, U.S.
- Height: 5 ft 6 in (168 cm)
- Weight: Featherweight; Super featherweight Lightweight

Boxing career
- Reach: 70 in (178 cm)

Boxing record
- Total fights: 161
- Wins: 99
- Win by KO: 28
- Losses: 48
- Draws: 14

Roger Bernard (born Orazio Bernardi; (Note: Also known as Roger Robert Bernard.) June 6, 1907 – September 17, 1954) was an American professional boxer who competed from 1926 to 1938. He held the Michigan State super featherweight and lightweight titles from 1927 and 1930. Between December 1930 and October 1931, Bernard was ranked as the world's No. 1 super featherweight contender by The Ring magazine and National Boxing Association. He was inducted into the Greater Flint Area Sports Hall of Fame in 1981.

== Early life ==
Orazio Bernardi was born on June 6, 1907, in Chicago, Illinois, and was of French and Italian descent. He grew up in Flint, Michigan, where he attended Homedale Elementary School and Flint Central High School.

== Boxing career ==
Initially fighting out of Ludington, Michigan, before relocating to Flint, Bernard was managed at various stages of his career by Max Hoff, Mike McNulty, and Raoul Godbout. He began his professional career competing as a featherweight, compiling a 14–2 record over his first 16 bouts.

On June 6, 1927, Bernard defeated Alex Miller by second-round knockout to capture the Michigan State super featherweight title. Bernard made his first title defense against Russell Bradford on July 8, fighting to a ten-round draw in the first of their four career meetings. Bernard faced Bradford in an immediate rematch three weeks later, outpointing him over ten rounds.

On July 18, 1928, Bernard knocked out Herman Perlick in the fifth round to win the Michigan State lightweight title. Two fights later, Bernard defended both his super featherweight and lightweight titles against Sailor DeShone, landing three times as many punches as his opponent and leaving him dazed and unsteady at the end of both the seventh and ninth rounds. Ringside reporters scored every round decisively in Bernard's favor, and referee Charles L. Miltenburger awarded him the decision.

On July 25, 1929, Bernard faced Young Terry McGovern, flooring him four times en route to a second-round technical knockout victory. Bernard next outpointed Bradford over ten rounds in their third meeting before facing him for the fourth and final time on October 30, earning a clear-cut decision victory in a thrilling ten-round contest in which he dictated the action throughout.

On March 10, 1930, Bernard faced former Olympian Pete Zivic, the older brother of Fritzie Zivic, in a scheduled ten-round bout. Bernard floored Zivic for nine-counts in the third, fifth, and sixth rounds before Zivic's corner threw in the towel following his sixth knockdown of the fight, giving Bernard a sixth-round technical knockout victory. On September 5, Bernard faced reigning world featherweight champion Battling Battalino in a non-title bout. Battalino held the advantage in the early rounds, flooring Bernard in the third, but Bernard quickly regained his feet and grew stronger as the fight progressed. In the seventh round, he drove Battalino against the ropes with a barrage of lefts and rights to the head, ultimately overcoming his early deficit to earn a decision victory on points.

On January 1, 1931, Bernard faced future world featherweight champion Freddie Miller in the first of their four career meetings, suffering a ten-round decision defeat. Bernard next faced future three-division world champion Barney Ross on March 27 at Chicago Stadium, outpointing him over eight rounds to earn the decision victory. Bernard then outpointed Harry Dublinsky on April 9, but lost the immediate rematch two weeks later. The two met for a third and final time on June 26, with Dublinsky again earning a decision victory. On October 12, Bernard faced Battalino in a rematch, again in a non-title bout. Bernard set a fast pace from the opening bell, fighting fearlessly throughout, while Battalino displayed brilliant boxing skills in the later rounds. However, Battalino's late efforts were not enough to overcome Bernard's early advantage, as Bernard earned a majority decision victory.

Bernard was scheduled to face reigning world super featherweight champion and future world featherweight champion Kid Chocolate in a non-title bout on June 15, 1932, but heavy rain forced the bout to be postponed until the following day. Chocolate dominated the opening four rounds, repeatedly landing blows to Bernard's head and body. Bernard rallied in the fifth, launching a determined attack and repeatedly driving Chocolate back on his heels with powerful rights to the face. However, Bernard was unable to sustain his offensive, allowing Chocolate to control the remaining rounds and cruise to a ten-round decision victory. On May 19, 1933, Bernard faced reigning Canadian lightweight champion Tommy Bland, knocking him through the ropes in the fourth round. In the fifth, after the two separated from a clinch in the center of the ring, Bernard staggered Bland with a left hook before delivering a devastating right that finished the bout.

On January 15, 1934, Bernard faced Miller in their second meeting, suffering another ten-round decision defeat. On July 11, Bernard faced future world lightweight champion Lou Ambers, who overwhelmed him from the opening bell and opened a cut above his left eye in the later rounds en route to a decisive ten-round decision victory. Bernard rebounded from the defeat with five consecutive stoppage victories over Joe Botta, Tiger Kid Walker, Dave Barry, Mickey Barron, and Foster Young.

Bernard was originally scheduled to face reigning world featherweight champion Miller for the third time in a non-title bout on August 14, 1935, but heavy rain forced the fight to be postponed until August 20. Miller controlled the opening round with right hooks and jabs before dropping Bernard for a nine-count with a straight left to the chin in the second. Bernard rallied in the fifth round and put up a respectable showing over the remaining rounds, but was ultimately outclassed and lost by unanimous decision. On November 13, Bernard faced Miller for the fourth and final time in another non-title bout. Bernard pressed the action for much of the fight, adopting a crouched stance with his hands held close to his body that made him a difficult target, absorbing many of Miller's punches on his gloves and shoulders. Miller gained the upper hand in the ninth round, landing several powerful lefts to the body, but Bernard refused to retreat and denied Miller any opportunity to land a knockout blow. Despite his determined performance, Bernard lost a close ten-round decision, much to the displeasure of the crowd.

On March 23, 1937, Bernard faced reigning world lightweight champion Ambers in a non-title rematch at I.M.A. Auditorium in Flint, losing a decisive ten-round decision as Ambers won seven of the rounds. On June 18, Bernard faced future world lightweight champion Sammy Angott, losing a decisive ten-round decision in a fast-paced bout.

Bernard retired from professional boxing in 1938 with a record of 99–48–14, including 28 victories by knockout. Between November 1929 and August 1932, he was ranked among the top ten super featherweight contenders in the world by The Ring magazine and National Boxing Association, reaching the No. 1 ranking on three occasions between December 1930 and October 1931.

== Personal life ==
Bernard married Rita Bombard on February 14, 1929, and the couple had a daughter, Sondra, born on December 23, 1932. He also had a brother named Fred, who was a professional boxer and served as his sparring partner.

== Death ==
Bernard died on September 17, 1954, after falling from a third-floor hotel room in Flint, Michigan. He was buried at Calvary Cemetery in Flint.

== Professional boxing record ==
161 fights	99 wins	48 losses
By knockout	28	6
By decision	71	42
Draws	14	

No.	Result	Record	Opponent	Type	Round, time	Date	Location	Notes
161	Loss	99–48–14	Billy Marquart	KO	2	Feb 14, 1938	Marigold Gardens, Chicago, Illinois, U.S.	
160	Loss	99–47–14	Everett Rightmire	KO	5	Dec 10, 1937	Armory, Minneapolis, Minnesota, U.S.	
159	Win	99–46–14	Jimmy Buckler	PTS	10	Oct 25, 1937	Flint, Michigan, U.S.	
158	Loss	98–46–14	Lloyd Pine	PTS	10	Oct 11, 1937	Flint, Michigan, U.S.	
157	Loss	98–45–14	Cecil Payne	PTS	10	Aug 11, 1937	Swiss Park Open Air Arena, Louisville, Kentucky, U.S.	
156	Draw	98–44–14	Wishy Jones	MD	10	Jul 19, 1937	Swiss Park Open Air Arena, Louisville, Kentucky, U.S.	
155	Loss	98–44–13	Sammy Angott	PTS	10	Jun 18, 1937	Riverview Rink, Milwaukee, Wisconsin, U.S.	
154	Loss	98–43–13	Everett Simington	PTS	8	May 21, 1937	Municipal Auditorium, Kansas City, Missouri, U.S.	
153	Loss	98–42–13	Jimmy Garrison	PTS	10	May 11, 1937	Pla-Mor Rink, Kansas City, Missouri, U.S.	
152	Loss	98–41–13	Al Nettlow	PTS	8	Apr 5, 1937	Eagles Club, Milwaukee, Wisconsin, U.S.	
151	Loss	98–40–13	Lou Ambers	PTS	10	Mar 23, 1937	Flint, Michigan, U.S.	
150	Loss	98–39–13	Larry Greb	PTS	8	Jan 29, 1937	Auditorium, Milwaukee, Wisconsin, U.S.	
149	Win	98–38–13	Larry Greb	PTS	8	Jan 1, 1937	Auditorium, Milwaukee, Wisconsin, U.S.	
148	Win	97–38–13	Wesley Martin	PTS	10	Dec 9, 1936	I.M.A. Auditorium, Flint, Michigan, U.S.	
147	Draw	96–38–13	Tony Herrera	PTS	10	Nov 12, 1936	Industrial Mutual Association Auditorium, Flint, Michigan, U.S.	
146	Loss	96–38–12	Johnny Stevens	UD	10	Aug 26, 1936	Parkway Arena, Cincinnati, Ohio, U.S.	
145	Loss	96–37–12	Everett Simington	KO	1	Aug 19, 1936	Open Air Arena, Poplar Bluff, Missouri, U.S.	
144	Loss	96–36–12	Johnny Stevens	UD	10	Aug 12, 1936	Parkway Arena, Cincinnati, Ohio, U.S.	
143	Loss	96–35–12	Chino Alvarez	PTS	10	Jul 14, 1936	Benjamin Field Arena, Tampa, Florida, U.S.	
142	Win	96–34–12	Joey Temmes	MD	10	May 11, 1936	Valley Arena, Holyoke, Massachusetts, U.S.	
141	Win	95–34–12	Tommy Rawson	MD	10	Apr 20, 1936	Valley Arena, Holyoke, Massachusetts, U.S.	
140	Win	94–34–12	Everett Simington	PTS	10	Mar 20, 1936	Hot Springs, Arkansas, U.S.	
139	Loss	93–34–12	Davey Day	PTS	10	Nov 22, 1935	Guyon's Paradise Ballroom, Chicago, Illinois, U.S.	
138	Loss	93–33–12	Freddie Miller	PTS	10	Nov 13, 1935	Maple Leaf Gardens, Toronto, Ontario, Canada	
137	Loss	93–32–12	Phil Baker	PTS	10	Oct 18, 1935	Columbus Hall, Stamford, Connecticut, U.S.	
136	Win	93–31–12	Leroy Born	PTS	10	Oct 11, 1935	I.M.A. Auditorium, Flint, Michigan, U.S.	
135	Win	92–31–12	Dave Barry	KO	6	Oct 5, 1935	Hazel Park, Michigan, U.S.	
134	Loss	91–31–12	Freddie Miller	UD	10	Aug 20, 1935	Northside Ballpark, Cincinnati, Ohio, U.S.	
133	Loss	91–30–12	Joey Temmes	UD	10	Jul 29, 1935	Griffith Stadium, Washington, D.C., U.S.	
132	Loss	91–29–12	Abe Wasserman	PTS	8	Jul 15, 1935	Dyckman Oval, Manhattan, New York, U.S.	
131	Draw	91–28–12	George Levy	PTS	10	Jul 12, 1935	Boardwalk Arena, Long Branch, New Jersey, U.S.	
130	Win	91–28–11	Lew Fox	PTS	8	Jul 1, 1935	Griffith Stadium, Washington, D.C., U.S.	
129	Win	90–28–11	Lew Fox	PTS	6	Jun 10, 1935	Griffith Stadium, Washington, D.C., U.S.	
128	Win	89–28–11	Joe Doherty	SD	10	Apr 22, 1935	Auditorium, Washington, D.C., U.S.	
127	Loss	88–28–11	Wesley Ramey	PTS	10	Apr 10, 1935	Civic Auditorium, Grand Rapids, Michigan, U.S.	
126	Loss	88–27–11	Mose Butch	PTS	8	Apr 5, 1935	I.M.A. Auditorium, Flint, Michigan, U.S.	
125	Loss	88–26–11	Mose Butch	PTS	10	Mar 1, 1935	I.M.A. Auditorium, Flint, Michigan, U.S.	
124	Win	88–25–11	Eddie Burl	TKO	5	Feb 1, 1935	I.M.A. Auditorium, Flint, Michigan, U.S.	
123	Loss	87–25–11	Leonard Del Genio	PTS	8	Nov 26, 1934	St. Nicholas Arena, New York City, New York, U.S.	
122	Loss	87–24–11	Mike Belloise	PTS	10	Nov 19, 1934	St. Nicholas Arena, New York City, New York, U.S.	
121	Win	87–23–11	Tiger Kid Walker	MD	12	Nov 14, 1934	Music Hall Arena, Cincinnati, Ohio, U.S.	
120	Win	86–23–11	Foster Young	TKO	7	Nov 8, 1934	Prudden Auditorium, Lansing, Michigan, U.S.	
119	Win	85–23–11	Mickey Barron	KO	2	Oct 19, 1934	Flint, Michigan, U.S.	
118	Win	84–23–11	Dave Barry	TKO	6	Oct 5, 1934	Naval Armory, Detroit, Michigan, U.S.	
117	Win	83–23–11	Tiger Kid Walker	KO	8	Sep 26, 1934	Music Hall Arena, Cincinnati, Ohio, U.S.	
116	Win	82–23–11	Joe Botta	TKO	2	Sep 11, 1934	Naval Armory, Detroit, Michigan, U.S.	
115	Loss	81–23–11	Lou Ambers	PTS	10	Jul 11, 1934	Ebbets Field, Brooklyn, New York, U.S.	
114	Win	81–22–11	Joey Zodda	PTS	8	Jun 26, 1934	Forum, Montreal, Quebec, Canada	
113	Win	80–22–11	Matty White	PTS	10	Jun 21, 1934	Exchange Stadium, Montreal, Quebec, Canada	
112	Win	79–22–11	Johnny Edwards	KO	4	Jun 18, 1934	Quebec City, Quebec, Canada	
111	Win	78–22–11	Eddie Shea	PTS	10	May 7, 1934	Flint, Michigan, U.S.	
110	Draw	77–22–11	Al Roth	PTS	10	Apr 18, 1934	Mount Royal Arena, Montreal, Quebec, Canada	
109	Loss	77–22–10	Freddie Miller	PTS	10	Jan 15, 1934	Flint, Michigan, U.S.	
108	Win	77–21–10	Battling Gizzy	PTS	10	Nov 1, 1933	Forum, Montreal, Quebec, Canada	
107	Loss	76–21–10	Joe Ghnouly	PTS	10	Oct 18, 1933	Forum, Montreal, Quebec, Canada	
106	Draw	76–20–10	Paul Junior	PTS	10	Sep 27, 1933	Forum, Montreal, Quebec, Canada	
105	Win	76–20–9	Jimmy Slavin	PTS	10	Sep 13, 1933	Forum, Montreal, Quebec, Canada	
104	Loss	75–20–9	Albert Ladou	PTS	12	Aug 16, 1933	Forum, Montreal, Quebec, Canada	
103	Win	75–19–9	Albert Ladou	PTS	10	Jul 26, 1933	Forum, Montreal, Quebec, Canada	
102	Win	74–19–9	Mike Dundee	PTS	10	Jun 19, 1933	I.M.A. Auditorium, Flint, Michigan, U.S.	
101	Win	73–19–9	Tommy Bland	KO	5	May 19, 1933	Mutual Street Arena, Toronto, Ontario, Canada	
100	Loss	72–19–9	Wesley Ramey	PTS	10	May 8, 1933	Flint, Michigan, U.S.	
99	Draw	72–18–9	Harold Stewart	PTS	8	Apr 12, 1933	Forum, Montreal, Quebec, Canada	
98	Win	72–18–8	Cowboy Eddie Anderson	PTS	10	Mar 27, 1933	Industrial Mutual Association Auditorium, Flint, Michigan, U.S.	
97	Win	71–18–8	Santiago Zorrilla	KO	2	Feb 6, 1933	Flint, Michigan, U.S.	
96	Win	70–18–8	Young Geno	PTS	10	Jan 16, 1933	Flint, Michigan, U.S.	
95	Loss	69–18–8	Young Geno	TKO	5	Nov 23, 1932	Arena Gardens, Detroit, Michigan, U.S.	
94	Loss	69–17–8	Joe Ghnouly	SD	10	Oct 25, 1932	Forum, Montreal, Quebec, Canada	
93	Draw	69–16–8	Albert Ladou	PTS	10	Aug 2, 1932	Baseball Stadium, Montreal, Quebec, Canada	
92	Loss	69–16–7	Kid Chocolate	PTS	10	Jun 16, 1932	Baker Bowl, Philadelphia, Pennsylvania, U.S.	
91	Win	69–15–7	Midget Mike O'Dowd	PTS	10	Mar 24, 1932	Flint, Michigan, U.S.	
90	Loss	68–15–7	Cowboy Eddie Anderson	PTS	10	Jan 7, 1932	Flint, Michigan, U.S.	
89	Loss	68–14–7	Battling Gizzy	PTS	10	Jan 1, 1932	Motor Square Garden, Pittsburgh, Pennsylvania, U.S.	
88	Draw	68–13–7	Cowboy Eddie Anderson	PTS	10	Dec 17, 1931	Flint, Michigan, U.S.	
87	Win	68–13–6	Battling Battalino	MD	10	Oct 12, 1931	Arena, Philadelphia, Pennsylvania, U.S.	
86	Loss	67–13–6	Prince Saunders	TKO	2	Sep 18, 1931	Saint Paul, Minnesota, U.S.	
85	Win	67–12–6	Charlie Crocker	PTS	10	Aug 14, 1931	Eau Claire, Wisconsin, U.S.	
84	Loss	66–12–6	Harry Dublinsky	PTS	10	Jun 26, 1931	Borchert Field, Milwaukee, Wisconsin, U.S.	
83	Win	66–11–6	Al 'Rube' Goldberg	TKO	5	May 20, 1931	Forum, Montreal, Quebec, Canada	
82	Loss	65–11–6	Harry Dublinsky	PTS	8	Apr 24, 1931	Chicago Stadium, Chicago, Illinois, U.S.	
81	Win	65–10–6	Harry Dublinsky	PTS	10	Apr 9, 1931	Auditorium, Milwaukee, Wisconsin, U.S.	
80	Win	64–10–6	Barney Ross	PTS	8	Mar 27, 1931	Chicago Stadium, Chicago, Illinois, U.S.	
79	Loss	63–10–6	Freddie Miller	UD	10	Jan 1, 1931	Music Hall Arena, Cincinnati, Ohio, U.S.	
78	Win	63–9–6	Jackie Cohen	PTS	10	Dec 17, 1930	Toledo, Ohio, U.S.	
77	Draw	62–9–6	Benny Duke	PTS	10	Dec 12, 1930	Prudden Auditorium, Lansing, Michigan, U.S.	Retained USA Michigan State lightweight title
76	Win	62–9–5	Steve Nugent	KO	3	Nov 22, 1930	Ohio National Guard Armory, Cincinnati, Ohio, U.S.	
75	Win	61–9–5	Leo (Kid) Roy	KO	2	Oct 9, 1930	Olympia Stadium, Detroit, Michigan, U.S.	
74	Win	60–9–5	Steve Nugent	TKO	6	Oct 1, 1930	Flint, Michigan, U.S.	
73	Win	59–9–5	Battling Battalino	PTS	10	Sep 5, 1930	Olympia Stadium, Detroit, Michigan, U.S.	
72	Win	58–9–5	Eddie Lord	PTS	10	Aug 20, 1930	Flint, Michigan, U.S.	
71	Win	57–9–5	Tony Lupica	NWS	3	Aug 11, 1930	Swayne Field, Toledo, Ohio, U.S.	
70	Win	56–9–5	Steve Smith	PTS	10	Jul 14, 1930	Flint, Michigan, U.S.	
69	Win	55–9–5	Young Zazzarino	UD	10	May 7, 1930	Forum, Montreal, Quebec, Canada	
68	Win	54–9–5	Jackie Cohen	PTS	10	Apr 9, 1930	Forum, Montreal, Quebec, Canada	
67	Win	53–9–5	Pete Zivic	TKO	6	Mar 10, 1930	Flint, Michigan, U.S.	
66	Win	52–9–5	Al DeRose	KO	3	Mar 4, 1930	Hot Springs, Arkansas, U.S.	
65	Draw	51–9–5	Benny Duke	PTS	10	Nov 29, 1929	Armory, Grand Rapids, Michigan, U.S.	
64	Win	51–9–4	Al Greenfield	PTS	10	Nov 22, 1929	Olympia Stadium, Detroit, Michigan, U.S.	
63	Win	50–9–4	Jackie Nichols	PTS	10	Nov 8, 1929	Prudden Auditorium, Lansing, Michigan, U.S.	
62	Win	49–9–4	Phil Goldstein	PTS	10	Nov 4, 1929	Motor Square Garden, Pittsburgh, Pennsylvania, U.S.	
61	Win	48–9–4	Russell Bradford	PTS	10	Oct 30, 1929	Armory, Grand Rapids, Michigan, U.S.	
60	Win	47–9–4	Billy Swinhoe	KO	2	Oct 3, 1929	Thumb Arena, Port Huron, Michigan, U.S.	
59	Win	46–9–4	Tony Herrera	PTS	10	Sep 16, 1929	I.M.A. Auditorium, Flint, Michigan, U.S.	
58	Win	45–9–4	Russell Bradford	PTS	10	Aug 26, 1929	Athletic Park, Flint, Michigan, U.S.	
57	Win	44–9–4	Young Terry McGovern	TKO	2	Jul 25, 1929	State Fairgrounds Arena, Detroit, Michigan, U.S.	
56	Win	43–9–4	Benny Ray	KO	7	Jun 24, 1929	Atwood Stadium, Flint, Michigan, U.S.	
55	Win	42–9–4	Ray Snell	TKO	6	Jun 10, 1929	Flint, Michigan, U.S.	
54	Win	41–9–4	Jack Dombrowski	PTS	6	Apr 11, 1929	Olympia Stadium, Detroit, Michigan, U.S.	
53	Draw	40–9–4	Joe Lucas	PTS	10	Mar 29, 1929	Auditorium Theater, Hot Springs, Arkansas, U.S.	
52	Win	40–9–3	Chico Cisneros	KO	8	Mar 22, 1929	Auditorium, Hot Springs, Arkansas, U.S.	
51	Win	39–9–3	Joe Paglina	PTS	5	Mar 8, 1929	Olympia Stadium, Detroit, Michigan, U.S.	
50	Loss	38–9–3	Jackie Nichols	DQ	3	Jan 15, 1929	Lansing, Michigan, U.S.	
49	Win	38–8–3	Herman Perlick	PTS	10	Dec 19, 1928	Armory, Grand Rapids, Michigan, U.S.	
48	Win	37–8–3	Sammy Caruso	PTS	10	Dec 6, 1928	Prudden Auditorium, Lansing, Michigan, U.S.	
47	Win	36–8–3	Herman Perlick	PTS	10	Nov 30, 1928	Kalamazoo, Michigan, U.S.	
46	Win	35–8–3	Nick Ellenwood	PTS	10	Nov 14, 1928	Masonic Temple, Kalamazoo, Michigan, U.S.	
45	Win	34–8–3	Joey Thomas	PTS	10	Nov 5, 1928	Flint, Michigan, U.S.	
44	Win	33–8–3	Jack Dombrowski	PTS	10	Oct 24, 1928	Armory, Port Huron, Michigan, U.S.	
43	Win	32–8–3	Jackie Nichols	PTS	8	Oct 12, 1928	Grand Rapids, Michigan, U.S.	
42	Loss	31–8–3	Benny McArthur	PTS	10	Oct 5, 1928	Saginaw, Michigan, U.S.	
41	Loss	31–7–3	Lew Kirsch	PTS	10	Sep 21, 1928	Olympia Stadium, Detroit, Michigan, U.S.	
40	Win	31–6–3	Benny McArthur	PTS	10	Sep 6, 1928	Saginaw, Michigan, U.S.	
39	Win	30–6–3	Charley Lupica	PTS	10	Aug 9, 1928	Saginaw, Michigan, U.S.	
38	Win	29–6–3	Sailor DeShone	PTS	10	Aug 3, 1928	Culver Park, Ludington, Michigan, U.S.	Retained USA Michigan State super featherweight and lightweight titles
37	Win	28–6–3	Santos Hernandez	KO	5	Jul 24, 1928	Watkins Field, Port Huron, Michigan, U.S.	
36	Win	27–6–3	Herman Perlick	KO	5	Jul 18, 1928	Kalamazoo, Michigan, U.S.	Won USA Michigan State lightweight title
35	Win	26–6–3	Al Kline	PTS	10	Jul 12, 1928	Saginaw, Michigan, U.S.	
34	Win	25–6–3	Charley Glaser	PTS	10	Jul 2, 1928	Flint, Michigan, U.S.	
33	Win	24–6–3	Al Kline	PTS	8	Jun 19, 1928	Flint, Michigan, U.S.	
32	Loss	23–6–3	Benny Ray	DQ	8	Jun 11, 1928	Jackson, Michigan, U.S.	
31	Win	23–5–3	Joe Belmont	PTS	10	May 12, 1928	Buick No. 11 Hall, Flint, Michigan, U.S.	
30	Win	22–5–3	Soldier DeShone	PTS	8	May 2, 1928	Armory, Port Huron, Michigan, U.S.	
29	Win	21–5–3	Joey Thomas	PTS	10	Apr 25, 1928	Benton Harbor, Michigan, U.S.	
28	Win	20–5–3	Tommy Meeking	PTS	8	Apr 2, 1928	Fairview A.C., Detroit, Michigan, U.S.	
27	Draw	19–5–3	Henry Perlick	PTS	4	Mar 7, 1928	Olympia Stadium, Detroit, Michigan, U.S.	
26	Loss	19–5–2	Patsy Ruffalo	PTS	10	Jan 25, 1928	Moose Temple, Detroit, Michigan, U.S.	
25	Win	19–4–2	Bobby Burns	NWS	?	Jan 11, 1928	Grand Rapids, Michigan, U.S.	
24	Draw	18–4–2	Henry Perlick	NWS	8	Jan 5, 1928	Grand Rapids, Michigan, U.S.	
23	Loss	18–4–1	Jackie Nichols	PTS	10	Dec 16, 1927	Moose Club, Detroit, Michigan, U.S.	
22	Win	18–3–1	Charley Lupica	PTS	10	Sep 12, 1927	Athletic Park, Flint, Michigan, U.S.	
21	Win	17–3–1	Russell Bradford	PTS	10	Jul 29, 1927	Saginaw, Michigan, U.S.	
20	Draw	16–3–1	Russell Bradford	PTS	10	Jul 8, 1927	Muskegon, Michigan, U.S.	Retained USA Michigan State super featherweight title
19	Win	16–3–0	Tony Ross	PTS	10	Jun 30, 1927	Flint, Michigan, U.S.	
18	Loss	15–3–0	Jimmy Robe	DQ	4	Jun 17, 1927	Mack Park, Detroit, Michigan, U.S.	
17	Win	15–2–0	Alex Miller	KO	2	Jun 6, 1927	Flint, Michigan, U.S.	Won USA Michigan State super featherweight title
16	Win	14–2–0	Spud Murphy	PTS	6	May 27, 1927	Coliseum Ring, Detroit, Michigan, U.S.	
15	Win	13–2–0	Sailor DeShone	TKO	9	Apr 28, 1927	I.M.A. Auditorium, Flint, Michigan, U.S.	
14	Win	12–2–0	Herman Perlick	NWS	6	Apr 26, 1927	Muskegon, Michigan, U.S.	
13	Win	11–2–0	Russell Bradford	NWS	10	Apr 19, 1927	Armory, Bay City, Michigan, U.S.	
12	Win	10–2–0	Bobby Young	KO	8	Apr 12, 1927	Industrial Mutual Association Auditorium, Flint, Michigan, U.S.	
11	Win	9–2–0	Sammy Caruso	PTS	8	Apr 7, 1927	Saginaw, Michigan, U.S.	
10	Win	8–2–0	Sammy Caruso	PTS	8	Mar 17, 1927	Bay City A.C., Bay City, Michigan, U.S.	
9	Win	7–2–0	Art Madden	NWS	8	Mar 12, 1927	Industrial Mutual Association Auditorium, Flint, Michigan, U.S.	
8	Win	6–2–0	Young Thomas	KO	3	Feb 21, 1927	Industrial Mutual Association Auditorium, Flint, Michigan, U.S.	
7	Loss	5–2–0	Sailor DeShone	NWS	10	Jan 31, 1927	Industrial Mutual Association Auditorium, Flint, Michigan, U.S.	
6	Win	5–1–0	Al Chabot	PTS	8	Nov 19, 1926	Industrial Mutual Association Auditorium, Flint, Michigan, U.S.	
5	Loss	4–1–0	Sailor DeShone	TKO	3	Sep 17, 1926	Lakeside Coliseum, Flint, Michigan, U.S.	
4	Win	4–0–0	Benny McArthur	PTS	8	Jul 14, 1926	Caro, Michigan, U.S.	
3	Win	3–0–0	Johnny Weber	UD	10	Jun 28, 1926	Dreamland Dancing Pavilion, Flint, Michigan, U.S.	
2	Win	2–0–0	Sammy Reed	PTS	6	May 22, 1926	Buick No. 11 Hall, Flint, Michigan, U.S.	
1	Win	1–0–0	Bennie Ferris	TKO	4	May 5, 1926	Woodmen Hall, Flint, Michigan, U.S.	

== See also ==
- List of male boxers
