= Lou Ambers =

American boxer (1913–1995)

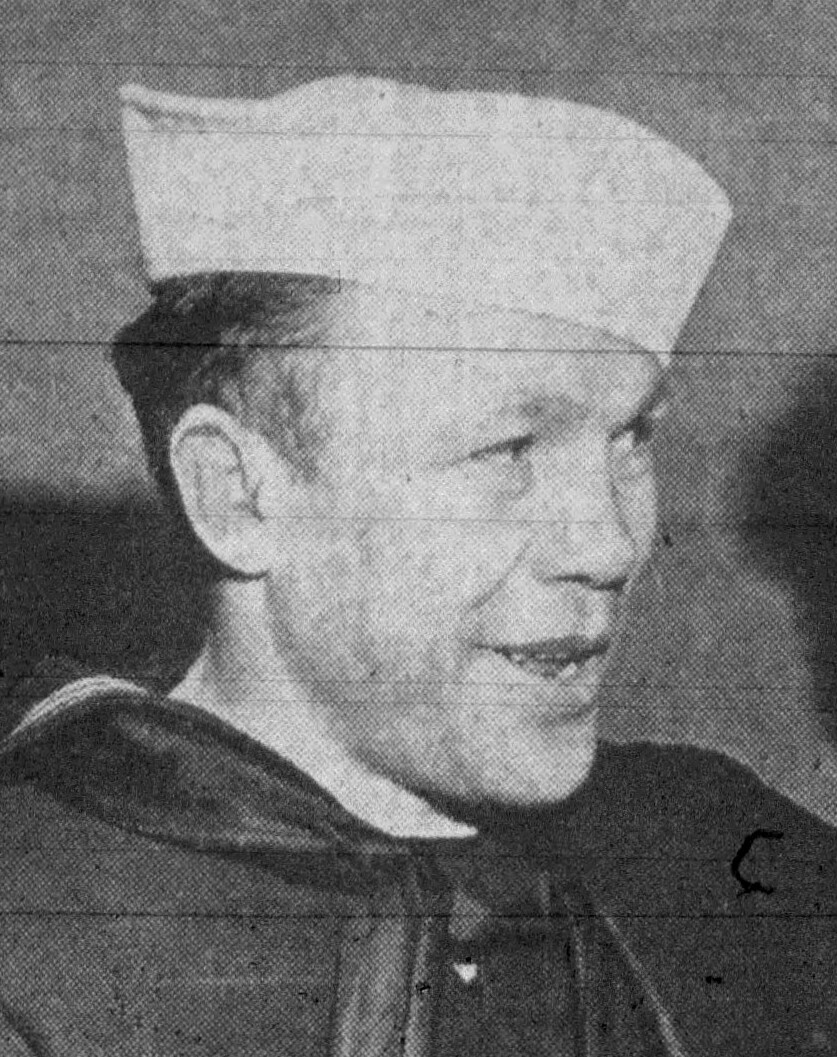
- Ambers, circa 1942

Personal information
- Nickname: The Herkimer Hurricane
- Born: Luigi Giuseppe d'Ambrosio; November 8, 1913 Herkimer, New York, US
- Died: April 25, 1995 (aged 81) Phoenix, Arizona, US
- Height: 5 ft 4 1/2 in (1.64 m)
- Weight: Lightweight; Welterweight

Boxing career
- Reach: 70 in (178 cm)
- Stance: Orthodox

Boxing record
- Total fights: 106
- Wins: 89
- Win by KO: 29
- Losses: 8
- Draws: 7
- No contests: 2

Luigi Giuseppe d'Ambrosio (November 9, 1913 – April 25, 1995), also known as Lou Ambers, was an American two-time Undisputed World Lightweight boxing champion who fought from 1932 to 1941. Ambers fought many other boxing greats, such as Henry Armstrong and Tony Canzoneri.

== Early life and career ==
Born Luigi Giuseppe d'Ambrosio on November 8, 1913, in Herkimer, Ambers started out in a large Italian family, struggling to find an identity. Luigi took a ring name because he was afraid his Italian mother would find out that he was a fighter.

He defeated future world junior welterweight champion Johnny Jadick in a ten round unanimous decision on March 19, 1934, in Holyoke, Massachusetts.

Ambers defeated former world junior welterweight title claimant Sammy Fuller on March 1, 1935, in a fifteen round unanimous decision at Madison Square Garden, New York City. Before a crowd of 10,000, Ambers was stunned by a left from Fuller in the third round, but had his way with his opponent much of the remainder of the bout, taking an impressive thirteen of fifteen rounds.

Managed by Al Weill and trained by Charley Goldman, the "Herkimer Hurricane", began his career losing only once in more than three years. He faced his greatest competitor, future hall of fame lightweight champion Tony Canzoneri on May 10, 1935. Canzoneri defeated him over 15 rounds on a decision in Madison Square Garden, robbing Ambers of his first shot at the title. Canzoneri had Ambers down twice in round three. A faithful crowd of 17,433 cheered as Canzoneri easily retook the title, knocking Ambers down again shortly before the closing bell.

Ambers did not let the defeat discourage him, winning his next 15 fights.

In one of his most difficult matches, Ambers defeated Fritzie Zivic on July 1, 1935, in a ten round unanimous decision in Millvale, Pennsylvania. Ambers took the lead in the opening rounds, and had enough of a points margin to take the decision, but in the last two rounds he retreated often, his jaw being broken in the ninth by what appeared to be a right to the chin. Zivic opened up with a right handed attack in the ninth and tenth that was simply not adequate to overcome the large points margin opened by his opponent. Ambers was examined by a local hospital after the bout and released.

Before a crowd of 8,266, Ambers defeated the highly rated former junior lightweight champion Frankie Klick in a ten round points decision at Madison Square Garden on January 3, 1936. Returning after his broken jaw only six months earlier, Ambers took some stiff shots to the chin in the sixth and seventh, but gained a significant points margin, winning eight of the ten rounds. In the seventh, Ambers put Klick to the canvas for a nine count as they broke from a clinch. Ambers gained a points advantage quickly, and his speed in the early rounds tired Klick, who was sapped of energy for a strong finish in the closing rounds. The win improved Ambers' chances of getting a second shot at Canzoneri for the title.

=== Winning the lightweight championship, September 1936 ===
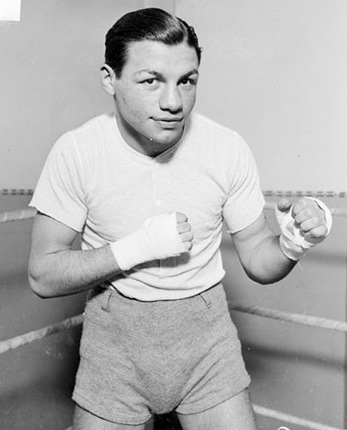
Tony Canzoneri

He gained revenge when he captured the lightweight championship by decisioning Tony Canzoneri in 15 rounds on September 3, 1936. As a former sparring partner of Canzoneri, he carried the fight to his opponent and mentor from the outset, turned back two spirited rallies, and won by a wide margin in a match that defined him as a boxer and competitor. Adding an exclamation point, the Associated Press gave Ambers nine rounds, including the last three.

Ambers won a lightweight title bout against Pedro Montanez on September 23, 1937, before an exceptional crowd of around 32,000, in a fifteen round mixed decision at New York's Polo Grounds. Though the referee voted for a draw, both judges scored the close bout in Amber's favor, with each voting he had won eight rounds. The Associated Press gave Ambers a generous twelve rounds, with only one, the thirteenth, to Montanez.

Jimmy Garrison lost to Ambers in a ten round points decision of a non-title bout in Kansas City on May 11, 1938. The United Press gave seven rounds to Ambers with only three to Garrison.

==== Loss of title to Henry Armstrong, August, 1938 ====
On August 17, 1938, Ambers met Henry Armstrong in an historic fight for the world lightweight title. Armstrong was attempting to become the first fighter in history to win and hold three world titles simultaneously. In a great fight, Ambers was knocked down twice, in the fifth and sixth rounds, and appeared badly beaten. Ambers mounted a great comeback in the later half of the match, but lost the controversial split decision. Armstrong was penalized three rounds in the close bout for fouls. Ambers lost the title for a year, until regaining it in a rematch one year later.

Frankie Wallace was one of Ambers' most frequent opponents. Wallace fell to Ambers for the last time when he could not return to the ring for the sixth round on December 5, 1938, in Cleveland. In a previous fight in the same city on December 6, 1937, Ambers won in a ten round unanimous decision on a large boxing ticket that featured a crowd of 12,000. With a rapid left and effective right uppercut, Ambers gained a strong points margin, and had an ailing Wallace missing throughout the bout. In their first meeting on April 27, 1933, in Utica, New York, Ambers took a six round points decision.

In their last meeting, Ambers achieved an eleventh round technical knockout of "Baby" Arizmendi on February 24, 1939, at New York's Madison Square Garden. In a close bout that the Brooklyn Daily Eagle scored five rounds to Arizmendi and four to Ambers, the referee stopped the bout in the eleventh due to a gash on his opponent's right eyelid received in the ninth which made it difficult for him to continue. The cut was opened again in the tenth with left uppercuts and examined by a Doctor at the end of the round, who ordered the referee to end the bout, which was officially called at the opening of the eleventh. It was the only knockout of Arizmendi's career.

==== Regaining lightweight title from Armstrong, August, 1939 ====
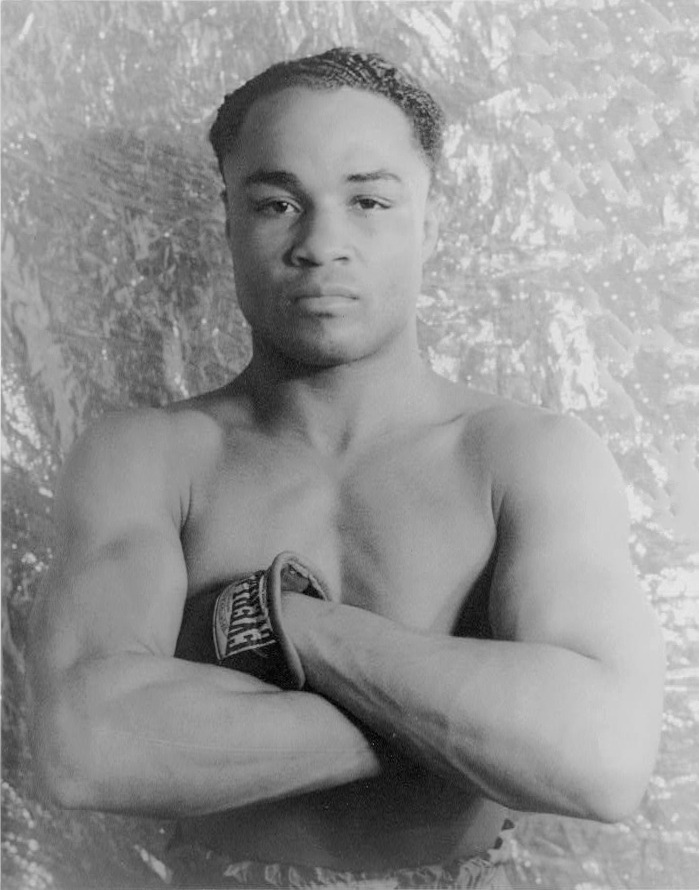
Henry Armstrong

Ambers' rematch with Henry Armstrong was as controversial as their first bout. Armstrong was penalized for low blows, which enabled Ambers to capture the 15-round decision on August 22, 1939, before a crowd estimated at 30,000. Penalized for low blows in the second, fifth, seventh, ninth, and eleventh rounds, Armstrong would have probably won the fight had it not been for his loss of points for fouls. James Dawson of The New York Times wrote that "The title was not won on competition alone but on fighting rules and ethics...Armstrong was the victim of an injustice". Demonstrating the closeness of the fight before accounting for Armstrong's fouls, the United Press scored the fight seven rounds for Ambers, with six for Armstrong, and two even. Unlike their first meeting, Ambers remained on his feet throughout the bout, except for a single slip in one round. He used infighting consistently in the match, cutting and bruising Armstrong's face. Many boxing reporters considered the match Ambers' last great performance.

=== Loss of world lightweight championship to Lew Jenkins, May, 1940 ===
On May 10, 1940, Ambers defended his title against the wild, free swinging, Lew Jenkins. Jenkins scored an upset when he knocked out the defending champion in the third round at Madison Square Garden. Ambers was down for a count of five in the first and briefly in the second. He had to arise from another fall to the canvas at least once prior to the referee stopping the bout 1:29 into the third.

Ambers sought a rematch, and after a tune up win over Al "Bummy" Davis, he again faced Jenkins. This time he suffered a technical knockout from Jenkins in the seventh round before 15,000 on February 28, 1941, at Madison Square Garden. After a slow start, Ambers appeared game, taking tough blows from Jenkins in the third through the sixth, while still using his left effectively at times. But in the seventh, Ambers was floored three times before the referee put an end to the fight, 2:26 into the seventh.

== Life outside of boxing ==
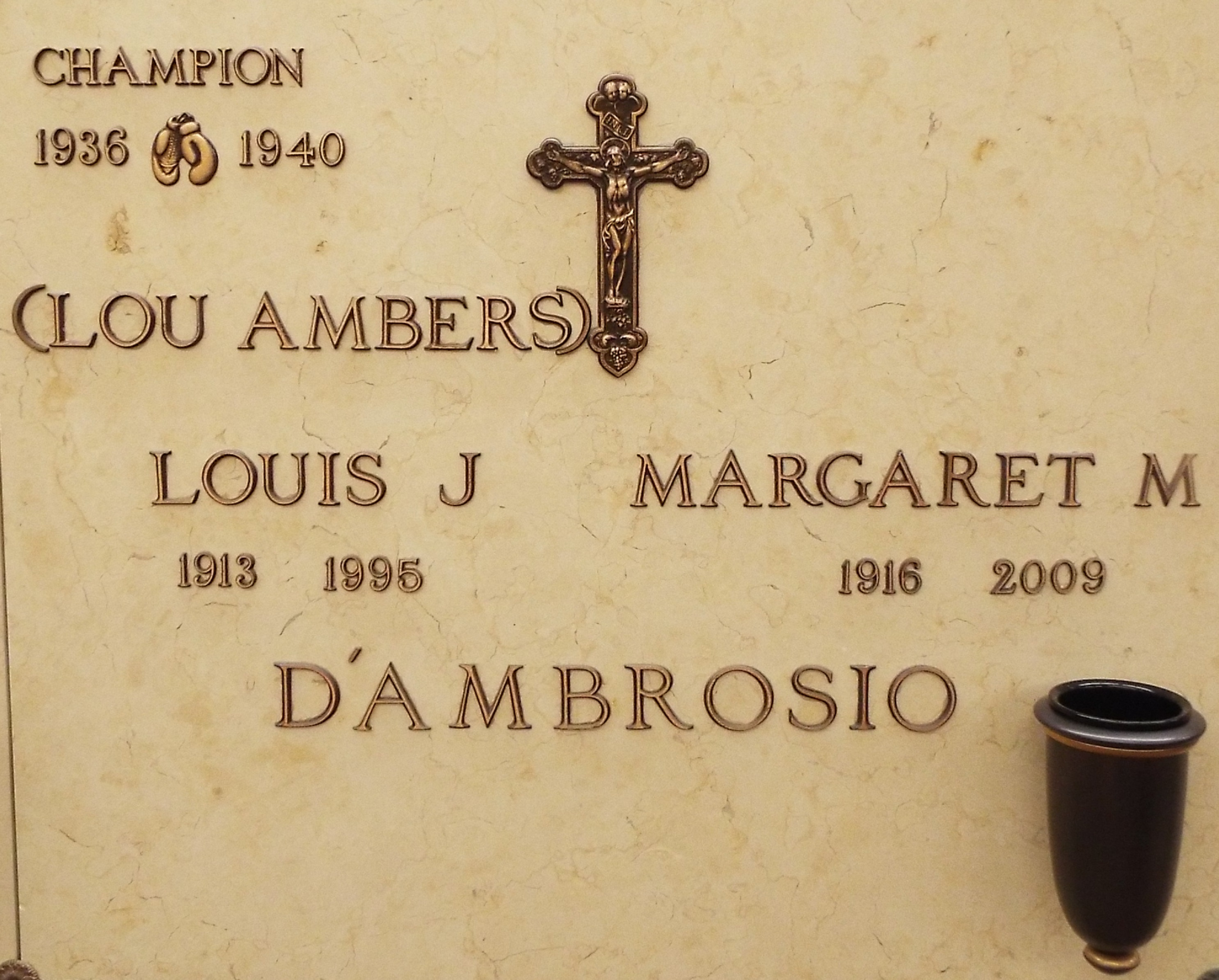
Crypt of Ambers and his wife Margaret

After his last bout, Ambers wanted to continue with his career, but his manager, Al Weill, convinced him that he was through, and to retire. Ambers never fought again.

Before his boxing retirement, he appeared as himself in a small role in MGM's The Crowd Roars (1938), a successful boxing movie starring Robert Taylor.

After his retirement from boxing, Ambers served in the Coast Guard in World War II. He later operated a restaurant, and worked in public relations. He died on April 25, 1995, in Phoenix, Arizona, and was interred at the Saint Francis Cemetery in Phoenix. He and his wife Margaret Mary had a daughter and two sons.

== Professional boxing record ==
All information in this section is derived from BoxRec, unless otherwise noted.

=== Official record ===
106 fights	89 wins	8 losses
By knockout	28	2
By decision	61	6
Draws	7	
Newspaper decisions/draws	2	

All newspaper decisions are officially regarded as "no decision" bouts and are not counted in the win/loss/draw column.

No.	Result	Record	Opponent	Type	Round	Date	Age	Location	Notes
106	Loss	89–8–7 (2)	Lew Jenkins	TKO	7 (10)	Feb 28, 1941	27 years, 112 days	Madison Square Garden, New York City, New York, U.S.	
105	Win	89–7–7 (2)	Norment Quarles	PTS	10	Feb 14, 1941	27 years, 98 days	State Armory, Hartford, Connecticut, U.S.	
104	Loss	88–7–7 (2)	Lew Jenkins	TKO	3 (15)	May 10, 1940	26 years, 184 days	Madison Square Garden, New York City, New York, U.S.	Lost NYSAC and The Ring lightweight titles
103	Win	88–6–7 (2)	Norment Quarles	PTS	10	Apr 25, 1940	26 years, 169 days	Municipal Auditorium, Charleston, North Carolina, U.S.	
102	Win	87–6–7 (2)	Wally Hally	PTS	10	Apr 17, 1940	26 years, 161 days	City Auditorium, Denver, Colorado, U.S.	
101	Win	86–6–7 (2)	Al Bummy Davis	UD	10	Feb 23, 1940	26 years, 107 days	Madison Square Garden, New York City, New York, U.S.	
100	Win	85–6–7 (2)	Wally Hally	UD	10	Jan 29, 1940	26 years, 82 days	Marieville Gardens, North Providence, Rhode Island, U.S	
99	Win	84–6–7 (2)	Jimmy Vaughn	PTS	10	Nov 16, 1939	26 years, 8 days	Foot Guard Hall, Hartford, Connecticut, U.S.	
98	Win	83–6–7 (2)	Henry Armstrong	UD	15	Aug 22, 1939	25 years, 287 days	Yankee Stadium, New York City, New York, U.S.	Won NYSAC, NBA, and The Ring lightweight titles
97	Win	82–6–7 (2)	Paul Junior	TKO	8 (10)	May 26, 1939	25 years, 199 days	Boston Garden, Boston, Massachusetts, U.S.	
96	Win	81–6–7 (2)	Jimmy Vaughn	PTS	10	May 8, 1939	25 years, 181 days	Arena, Philadelphia, Pennsylvania, U.S.	
95	Win	80–6–7 (2)	Honey Mellody	TKO	4 (10)	Apr 25, 1939	25 years, 168 days	Boston Garden, Boston, Massachusetts, U.S.	
94	Win	79–6–7 (2)	Baby Arizmendi	TKO	11 (12)	Feb 24, 1939	25 years, 108 days	Madison Square Garden, New York City, New York, U.S.	
93	Win	78–6–7 (2)	Paul Junior	UD	10	Jan 27, 1939	25 years, 80 days	Boston Garden, Boston, Massachusetts, U.S.	
92	Win	77–6–7 (2)	Joey Silva	PTS	10	Jan 16, 1939	25 years, 69 days	Arena, Philadelphia, Pennsylvania, U.S.	
91	Win	76–6–7 (2)	Frankie Wallace	RTD	6 (10)	Dec 5, 1938	25 years, 27 days	Arena, Cleveland, Ohio, U.S.	
90	Win	75–6–7 (2)	Tommy Cross	UD	10	Nov 28, 1938	25 years, 20 days	Arena, Philadelphia, Pennsylvania, U.S.	
89	Win	74–6–7 (2)	Steve Halaiko	TKO	3 (10)	Oct 28, 1938	24 years, 354 days	Arena, Syracuse, New York, U.S.	
88	Loss	73–6–7 (2)	Henry Armstrong	SD	15	Aug 17, 1938	24 years, 282 days	Madison Square Garden, New York City, New York, U.S.	Lost NYSAC, NBA, and The Ring lightweight titles
87	Win	73–5–7 (2)	Jimmy Vaughn	PTS	10	Jun 21, 1938	24 years, 225 days	Olympic Auditorium, Los Angeles, California, U.S.	
86	Draw	72–5–7 (2)	Baby Arizmendi	PTS	10	Jun 7, 1938	24 years, 211 days	Olympic Auditorium, Los Angeles, California, U.S.	
85	Win	72–5–6 (2)	Jimmy Garrison	PTS	10	May 11, 1938	24 years, 184 days	Municipal Auditorium, Kansas City, Missouri, U.S.	
84	Win	71–5–6 (2)	Jimmy Vaughn	PTS	10	May 6, 1938	24 years, 179 days	Jefferson County Armory, Louisville, Kentucky, U.S.	
83	Win	70–5–6 (2)	Lou Jallos	KO	4 (10)	Feb 21, 1938	24 years, 105 days	City Auditorium, Richmond, Virginia, U.S.	
82	Win	69–5–6 (2)	Frankie Wallace	UD	10	Dec 6, 1937	24 years, 28 days	Arena, Cleveland, Ohio, U.S.	
81	Win	68–5–6 (2)	Charley Burns	MD	10	Nov 16, 1937	24 years, 8 days	Municipal Auditorium, Saint Louis, Missouri, U.S.	
80	Win	67–5–6 (2)	Pedro Montañez	MD	15	Sep 23, 1937	23 years, 319 days	Polo Grounds, New York City, New York, U.S.	Retained NYSAC, NBA, and The Ring lightweight titles
79	Win	66–5–6 (2)	Howard Scott	PTS	10	Sep 1, 1937	23 years, 297 days	Griffith Stadium, Washington, District of Columbia, U.S.	
78	Win	65–5–6 (2)	Howard Scott	PTS	10	Aug 16, 1937	23 years, 281 days	Madison Square Garden, New York City, New York, U.S.	
77	Win	64–5–6 (2)	Tony Canzoneri	UD	15	May 7, 1937	23 years, 180 days	Madison Square Garden, New York City, New York, U.S.	Retained NYSAC, NBA, and The Ring lightweight titles
76	Win	63–5–6 (2)	Phil Baker	PTS	10	Apr 19, 1937	23 years, 162 days	Madison Square Garden, New York City, New York, U.S.	
75	Loss	62–5–6 (2)	Pedro Montañez	UD	10	Apr 5, 1937	23 years, 148 days	Madison Square Garden, New York City, New York, U.S.	
74	Win	62–4–6 (2)	Roger Bernard	PTS	10	Mar 23, 1937	23 years, 135 days	Flint, Michigan, U.S.	
73	Win	61–4–6 (2)	Al Roth	UD	10	Feb 22, 1937	23 years, 106 days	St. Nicholas Arena, New York City, New York, U.S.	
72	Win	60–4–6 (2)	Davey Day	SD	10	Feb 10, 1937	23 years, 94 days	Hippodrome, New York City, New York, U.S.	
71	Draw	59–4–6 (2)	Enrico Venturi	PTS	10	Jan 8, 1937	23 years, 61 days	Madison Square Garden, New York City, New York, U.S.	
70	Win	59–4–5 (2)	Stumpy Jacobs	TKO	7 (10)	Dec 29, 1936	23 years, 51 days	Convention Hall, Rochester, New York, U.S.	
69	Loss	58–4–5 (2)	Jimmy McLarnin	UD	10	Nov 20, 1936	23 years, 12 days	Madison Square Garden, New York City, New York, U.S.	
68	Loss	58–3–5 (2)	Eddie Cool	SD	10	Oct 28, 1936	22 years, 355 days	Arena, Philadelphia, Pennsylvania, U.S.	
67	Win	58–2–5 (2)	Tony Canzoneri	UD	15	Sep 3, 1936	22 years, 300 days	Madison Square Garden, New York City, New York, U.S.	Won NYSAC, NBA, and The Ring lightweight titles
66	Win	57–2–5 (2)	Joey Greb	PTS	10	Jul 6, 1936	22 years, 241 days	Meadowbrook Field, Newark, New Jersey, U.S.	
65	Win	56–2–5 (2)	Jackie Sharkey	TKO	6 (10)	May 5, 1936	22 years, 179 days	Civic Auditorium, Grand Rapids, Michigan, U.S.	
64	Win	55–2–5 (2)	Orville Drouillard	PTS	10	Apr 22, 1936	22 years, 166 days	Naval Armory, Detroit, Michigan, U.S.	
63	Win	54–2–5 (2)	Buster Brown	KO	1 (10)	Apr 15, 1936	22 years, 159 days	Marieville Gardens, North Providence, Rhode Island, U.S	
62	Win	53–2–5 (2)	Pete Mascia	PTS	6	Apr 7, 1936	22 years, 151 days	Broadway Arena, New York City, New York, U.S.	
61	Win	52–2–5 (2)	Tony Scarpati	TKO	8 (10)	Mar 17, 1936	22 years, 130 days	Broadway Arena, New York City, New York, U.S.	Scarpati died of from injuries sustained in the fight
60	Win	51–2–5 (2)	Eddie Marks	TKO	3 (10)	Feb 14, 1936	22 years, 98 days	Convention Hall, Utica, New York, U.S.	
59	Win	50–2–5 (2)	Baby Arizmendi	UD	10	Feb 7, 1936	22 years, 91 days	Madison Square Garden, New York City, New York, U.S.	
58	Win	49–2–5 (2)	Tony Herrera	TKO	9 (10)	Jan 21, 1936	22 years, 74 days	Broadway Arena, New York City, New York, U.S.	
57	Win	48–2–5 (2)	Frankie Klick	PTS	10	Jan 3, 1936	22 years, 56 days	Madison Square Garden, New York City, New York, U.S.	
56	Win	47–2–5 (2)	Lou Jallos	TKO	3 (10)	Dec 20, 1935	22 years, 42 days	Arena, Syracuse, New York, U.S.	
55	Win	46–2–5 (2)	Jimmy Vaughn	PTS	8	Dec 16, 1935	22 years, 38 days	Public Hall, Cleveland, Ohio, U.S.	
54	Win	45–2–5 (2)	George Levy	PTS	10	Nov 25, 1935	22 years, 17 days	Laurel Garden, Newark, New Jersey, U.S.	
53	Win	44–2–5 (2)	Fritzie Zivic	UD	10	Jul 1, 1935	21 years, 235 days	Hickey Park, Millvale, Pennsylvania, U.S.	
52	Loss	43–2–5 (2)	Tony Canzoneri	UD	15	May 10, 1935	21 years, 183 days	Madison Square Garden, New York City, New York, U.S.	For vacant NYSAC, NBA, and The Ring lightweight titles
51	Win	43–1–5 (2)	Honeyboy Hughes	TKO	4 (10)	Apr 24, 1935	21 years, 167 days	Providence, Rhode Island, U.S	
50	Win	42–1–5 (2)	Sammy Fuller	UD	15	Mar 1, 1935	21 years, 113 days	Madison Square Garden, New York City, New York, U.S.	
49	Win	41–1–5 (2)	Harry Dublinsky	UD	10	Jan 11, 1935	21 years, 64 days	Madison Square Garden, New York City, New York, U.S.	
48	Win	40–1–5 (2)	Pancho Villa	PTS	10	Dec 28, 1934	21 years, 50 days	Casino, Fall River, Massachusetts, U.S.	
47	Win	39–1–5 (2)	Mickey Paul	KO	1 (10)	Dec 17, 1934	21 years, 39 days	Convention Hall, Utica, New York, U.S.	
46	Win	38–1–5 (2)	Billy Hogan	PTS	10	Sep 26, 1934	20 years, 322 days	South Park Arena, Hartford, Connecticut, U.S.	
45	Win	37–1–5 (2)	Tony Herrera	PTS	10	Aug 29, 1934	20 years, 294 days	South Park Arena, Hartford, Connecticut, U.S.	
44	Win	36–1–5 (2)	Roger Bernard	PTS	10	Jul 11, 1934	20 years, 245 days	South Park Arena, Hartford, Connecticut, U.S.	
43	Win	35–1–5 (2)	Phil Rafferty	TKO	8 (10)	Jun 28, 1934	20 years, 232 days	South Park Arena, Hartford, Connecticut, U.S.	
42	Draw	34–1–5 (2)	Jimmy Leto	PTS	10	Jun 18, 1934	20 years, 222 days	South Park Arena, Hartford, Connecticut, U.S.	
41	Draw	34–1–4 (2)	Steve Halaiko	PTS	10	May 25, 1934	20 years, 198 days	Rhode Island Auditorium, Providence, Rhode Island, U.S.	
40	Win	34–1–3 (2)	Jackie Davis	KO	4 (10)	May 18, 1934	20 years, 191 days	Rhode Island Auditorium, Providence, Rhode Island, U.S.	
39	Loss	33–1–3 (2)	Steve Halaiko	MD	6	May 7, 1934	20 years, 180 days	Arena, Syracuse, New York, U.S.	
38	Win	33–0–3 (2)	Billy Lynch	TKO	9 (10)	Apr 26, 1934	20 years, 169 days	Providence, Rhode Island, U.S.	
37	Win	32–0–3 (2)	Eddie Dempsey	KO	3 (6)	Apr 16, 1934	20 years, 159 days	State Armory, Mohawk, New York, U.S.	
36	Win	31–0–3 (2)	Johnny Jadick	UD	10	Mar 19, 1934	20 years, 131 days	Valley Arena, Holyoke, Massachusetts, U.S.	
35	Win	30–0–3 (2)	Tommy Bashara	KO	2 (10)	Mar 12, 1934	20 years, 124 days	Arena, Philadelphia, Pennsylvania, U.S.	
34	Win	29–0–3 (2)	Tommy Romano	PTS	10	Mar 2, 1934	20 years, 114 days	Rhode Island Auditorium, Providence, Rhode Island, U.S.	
33	Win	28–0–3 (2)	Paris Apice	PTS	10	Jan 24, 1934	20 years, 77 days	Rhode Island Auditorium, Providence, Rhode Island, U.S.	
32	Win	27–0–3 (2)	Patsy LaRocco	TKO	7 (10)	Jan 8, 1934	20 years, 61 days	Valley Arena, Holyoke, Massachusetts, U.S.	
31	Win	26–0–3 (2)	Young Joe Firpo	PTS	10	Dec 25, 1933	20 years, 47 days	Arena, Philadelphia, Pennsylvania, U.S.	
30	Win	25–0–3 (2)	Cocoa Kid	PTS	10	Dec 5, 1933	20 years, 27 days	Rhode Island Auditorium, Providence, Rhode Island, U.S.	
29	Win	24–0–3 (2)	Stanley Winneryk	TKO	2 (6)	Nov 27, 1933	20 years, 19 days	Arena, Philadelphia, Pennsylvania, U.S.	
28	Win	23–0–3 (2)	Paris Apice	PTS	10	Oct 30, 1933	19 years, 356 days	Valley Arena, Holyoke, Massachusetts, U.S.	
27	Win	22–0–3 (2)	Phil Rafferty	PTS	10	Oct 23, 1933	19 years, 349 days	Valley Arena, Holyoke, Massachusetts, U.S.	
26	Win	21–0–3 (2)	Johnny Gaito	PTS	10	Oct 9, 1933	19 years, 305 days	Valley Arena, Holyoke, Massachusetts, U.S.	
25	Win	20–0–3 (2)	Stanley Krannenberg	PTS	8	Sep 25, 1933	19 years, 321 days	Englewood Arena, Englewood, New Jersey, U.S.	
24	Win	19–0–3 (2)	Joey Costa	PTS	6	Sep 12, 1933	19 years, 308 days	Polo Grounds, New York City, New York, U.S.	
23	Draw	18–0–3 (2)	Charley Badami	PTS	6	Aug 29, 1933	19 years, 294 days	Fugazy Bowl, New York City, New York, U.S.	
22	Win	18–0–2 (2)	Honey Mellody	UD	10	Aug 14, 1933	19 years, 279 days	Heywood Arena, West Springfield, Massachusetts, U.S.	
21	Win	17–0–2 (2)	Jack Rose	PTS	4	Aug 9, 1933	19 years, 274 days	Polo Grounds, New York City, New York, U.S.	
20	Win	16–0–2 (2)	Roland LeCuyer	TKO	3 (6)	Jul 31, 1933	19 years, 265 days	Heywood Arena, West Springfield, Massachusetts, U.S.	
19	Win	15–0–2 (2)	Al Pieretti	KO	3 (6)	Jul 17, 1933	19 years, 251 days	Englewood Arena, Englewood, New Jersey, U.S.	
18	Win	14–0–2 (2)	Patsy LaRocco	PTS	6	Jul 13, 1933	19 years, 247 days	Fugazy Bowl, New York City, New York, U.S.	
17	Win	13–0–2 (2)	Ernie Tedesco	NWS	6	Jul 3, 1933	19 years, 237 days	Englewood Arena, Englewood, New Jersey, U.S.	
16	Win	13–0–2 (1)	Tony Scarpati	PTS	6	Jun 27, 1933	19 years, 231 days	Fugazy Bowl, New York City, New York, U.S.	
15	Win	12–0–2 (1)	Tommy Barredo	KO	2 (?)	May 22, 1933	19 years, 195 days	Jamaica Arena, New York City, New York, U.S.	
14	Win	11–0–2 (1)	Frankie Wallace	PTS	6	Apr 27, 1933	19 years, 170 days	Convention Hall, Utica, New York, U.S.	
13	Win	10–0–2 (1)	Freddie Mitchell	UD	6	Apr 24, 1933	19 years, 167 days	Knights of Columbus Hall, Utica, New York, U.S.	
12	Draw	9–0–2 (1)	Charley Badami	PTS	6	Apr 3, 1933	19 years, 146 days	Jamaica Arena, New York City, New York, U.S.	
11	Win	9–0–1 (1)	Paul Scalfaro	PTS	5	Mar 20, 1933	19 years, 132 days	Jamaica Arena, New York City, New York, U.S.	
10	Win	8–0–1 (1)	Pedro Nieves	PTS	5	Feb 27, 1933	19 years, 111 days	New York Coliseum, New York City, New York, U.S.	
9	Win	7–0–1 (1)	Joey Kolba	PTS	6	Feb 20, 1933	19 years, 104 days	Utica, New York, U.S.	
8	Win	6–0–1 (1)	Ripper Martin	PTS	6	Jan 24, 1933	19 years, 77 days	Convention Hall, Utica, New York, U.S.	
7	Win	5–0–1 (1)	Johnny Clarey	TKO	5 (6)	Jan 17, 1933	19 years, 70 days	Convention Hall, Utica, New York, U.S.	
6	Win	4–0–1 (1)	Jerry White	KO	4 (6)	Nov 18, 1932	19 years, 10 days	Carlstadt, New Jersey, U.S.	
5	Draw	3–0–1 (1)	Phil Stark	PTS	6	Nov 14, 1932	19 years, 6 days	New York Coliseum, New York City, New York, U.S.	
4	Win	3–0 (1)	Ray Meyers	PTS	5	Jul 26, 1932	18 years, 261 days	New Lenox S.C., New York, U.S.	
3	Win	2–0 (1)	Mel Doty	NWS	6	Sep 6, 1932	18 years, 303 days	Englewood Arena, Englewood, New Jersey, U.S.	
2	Win	2–0	Joe Pelicano	PTS	6	Jul 14, 1932	18 years, 249 days	Fort Hamilton Arena, New York City, New York, U.S.	
1	Win	1–0	Frankie Curry	TKO	3 (4)	Jun 9, 1932	18 years, 214 days	Fort Hamilton Arena, New York City, New York, U.S.	

=== Unofficial record ===
106 fights	91 wins	8 losses
By knockout	28	2
By decision	63	6
Draws	7	

Record with the inclusion of newspaper decisions in the win/loss/draw column.

No.	Result	Record	Opponent	Type	Round	Date	Age	Location	Notes
106	Loss	91–8–7	Lew Jenkins	TKO	7 (10)	Feb 28, 1941	27 years, 112 days	Madison Square Garden, New York City, New York, U.S.	
105	Win	91–7–7	Norment Quarles	PTS	10	Feb 14, 1941	27 years, 98 days	State Armory, Hartford, Connecticut, U.S.	
104	Loss	90–7–7	Lew Jenkins	TKO	3 (15)	May 10, 1940	26 years, 184 days	Madison Square Garden, New York City, New York, U.S.	Lost NYSAC and The Ring lightweight titles
103	Win	90–6–7	Norment Quarles	PTS	10	Apr 25, 1940	26 years, 169 days	Municipal Auditorium, Charleston, North Carolina, U.S.	
102	Win	89–6–7	Wally Hally	PTS	10	Apr 17, 1940	26 years, 161 days	City Auditorium, Denver, Colorado, U.S.	
101	Win	88–6–7	Al Bummy Davis	UD	10	Feb 23, 1940	26 years, 107 days	Madison Square Garden, New York City, New York, U.S.	
100	Win	87–6–7	Wally Hally	UD	10	Jan 29, 1940	26 years, 82 days	Marieville Gardens, North Providence, Rhode Island, U.S	
99	Win	86–6–7	Jimmy Vaughn	PTS	10	Nov 16, 1939	26 years, 8 days	Foot Guard Hall, Hartford, Connecticut, U.S.	
98	Win	85–6–7	Henry Armstrong	UD	15	Aug 22, 1939	25 years, 287 days	Yankee Stadium, New York City, New York, U.S.	Won NYSAC, NBA, and The Ring lightweight titles
97	Win	84–6–7	Paul Junior	TKO	8 (10)	May 26, 1939	25 years, 199 days	Boston Garden, Boston, Massachusetts, U.S.	
96	Win	83–6–7	Jimmy Vaughn	PTS	10	May 8, 1939	25 years, 181 days	Arena, Philadelphia, Pennsylvania, U.S.	
95	Win	82–6–7	Honey Mellody	TKO	4 (10)	Apr 25, 1939	25 years, 168 days	Boston Garden, Boston, Massachusetts, U.S.	
94	Win	81–6–7	Baby Arizmendi	TKO	11 (12)	Feb 24, 1939	25 years, 108 days	Madison Square Garden, New York City, New York, U.S.	
93	Win	80–6–7	Paul Junior	UD	10	Jan 27, 1939	25 years, 80 days	Boston Garden, Boston, Massachusetts, U.S.	
92	Win	79–6–7	Joey Silva	PTS	10	Jan 16, 1939	25 years, 69 days	Arena, Philadelphia, Pennsylvania, U.S.	
91	Win	78–6–7	Frankie Wallace	RTD	6 (10)	Dec 5, 1938	25 years, 27 days	Arena, Cleveland, Ohio, U.S.	
90	Win	77–6–7	Tommy Cross	UD	10	Nov 28, 1938	25 years, 20 days	Arena, Philadelphia, Pennsylvania, U.S.	
89	Win	76–6–7	Steve Halaiko	TKO	3 (10)	Oct 28, 1938	24 years, 354 days	Arena, Syracuse, New York, U.S.	
88	Loss	75–6–7	Henry Armstrong	SD	15	Aug 17, 1938	24 years, 282 days	Madison Square Garden, New York City, New York, U.S.	Lost NYSAC, NBA, and The Ring lightweight titles
87	Win	75–5–7	Jimmy Vaughn	PTS	10	Jun 21, 1938	24 years, 225 days	Olympic Auditorium, Los Angeles, California, U.S.	
86	Draw	74–5–7	Baby Arizmendi	PTS	10	Jun 7, 1938	24 years, 211 days	Olympic Auditorium, Los Angeles, California, U.S.	
85	Win	74–5–6	Jimmy Garrison	PTS	10	May 11, 1938	24 years, 184 days	Municipal Auditorium, Kansas City, Missouri, U.S.	
84	Win	73–5–6	Jimmy Vaughn	PTS	10	May 6, 1938	24 years, 179 days	Jefferson County Armory, Louisville, Kentucky, U.S.	
83	Win	72–5–6	Lou Jallos	KO	4 (10)	Feb 21, 1938	24 years, 105 days	City Auditorium, Richmond, Virginia, U.S.	
82	Win	71–5–6	Frankie Wallace	UD	10	Dec 6, 1937	24 years, 28 days	Arena, Cleveland, Ohio, U.S.	
81	Win	70–5–6	Charley Burns	MD	10	Nov 16, 1937	24 years, 8 days	Municipal Auditorium, Saint Louis, Missouri, U.S.	
80	Win	69–5–6	Pedro Montañez	MD	15	Sep 23, 1937	23 years, 319 days	Polo Grounds, New York City, New York, U.S.	Retained NYSAC, NBA, and The Ring lightweight titles
79	Win	68–5–6	Howard Scott	PTS	10	Sep 1, 1937	23 years, 297 days	Griffith Stadium, Washington, District of Columbia, U.S.	
78	Win	67–5–6	Howard Scott	PTS	10	Aug 16, 1937	23 years, 281 days	Madison Square Garden, New York City, New York, U.S.	
77	Win	66–5–6	Tony Canzoneri	UD	15	May 7, 1937	23 years, 180 days	Madison Square Garden, New York City, New York, U.S.	Retained NYSAC, NBA, and The Ring lightweight titles
76	Win	65–5–6	Phil Baker	PTS	10	Apr 19, 1937	23 years, 162 days	Madison Square Garden, New York City, New York, U.S.	
75	Loss	64–5–6	Pedro Montañez	UD	10	Apr 5, 1937	23 years, 148 days	Madison Square Garden, New York City, New York, U.S.	
74	Win	64–4–6	Roger Bernard	PTS	10	Mar 23, 1937	23 years, 135 days	Flint, Michigan, U.S.	
73	Win	63–4–6	Al Roth	UD	10	Feb 22, 1937	23 years, 106 days	St. Nicholas Arena, New York City, New York, U.S.	
72	Win	62–4–6	Davey Day	SD	10	Feb 10, 1937	23 years, 94 days	Hippodrome, New York City, New York, U.S.	
71	Draw	61–4–6	Enrico Venturi	PTS	10	Jan 8, 1937	23 years, 61 days	Madison Square Garden, New York City, New York, U.S.	
70	Win	61–4–5	Stumpy Jacobs	TKO	7 (10)	Dec 29, 1936	23 years, 51 days	Convention Hall, Rochester, New York, U.S.	
69	Loss	60–4–5	Jimmy McLarnin	UD	10	Nov 20, 1936	23 years, 12 days	Madison Square Garden, New York City, New York, U.S.	
68	Loss	60–3–5	Eddie Cool	SD	10	Oct 28, 1936	22 years, 355 days	Arena, Philadelphia, Pennsylvania, U.S.	
67	Win	60–2–5	Tony Canzoneri	UD	15	Sep 3, 1936	22 years, 300 days	Madison Square Garden, New York City, New York, U.S.	Won NYSAC, NBA, and The Ring lightweight titles
66	Win	59–2–5	Joey Greb	PTS	10	Jul 6, 1936	22 years, 241 days	Meadowbrook Field, Newark, New Jersey, U.S.	
65	Win	58–2–5	Jackie Sharkey	TKO	6 (10)	May 5, 1936	22 years, 179 days	Civic Auditorium, Grand Rapids, Michigan, U.S.	
64	Win	57–2–5	Orville Drouillard	PTS	10	Apr 22, 1936	22 years, 166 days	Naval Armory, Detroit, Michigan, U.S.	
63	Win	56–2–5	Buster Brown	KO	1 (10)	Apr 15, 1936	22 years, 159 days	Marieville Gardens, North Providence, Rhode Island, U.S	
62	Win	55–2–5	Pete Mascia	PTS	6	Apr 7, 1936	22 years, 151 days	Broadway Arena, New York City, New York, U.S.	
61	Win	54–2–5	Tony Scarpati	TKO	8 (10)	Mar 17, 1936	22 years, 130 days	Broadway Arena, New York City, New York, U.S.	Scarpati died of from injuries sustained in the fight
60	Win	53–2–5	Eddie Marks	TKO	3 (10)	Feb 14, 1936	22 years, 98 days	Convention Hall, Utica, New York, U.S.	
59	Win	52–2–5	Baby Arizmendi	UD	10	Feb 7, 1936	22 years, 91 days	Madison Square Garden, New York City, New York, U.S.	
58	Win	51–2–5	Tony Herrera	TKO	9 (10)	Jan 21, 1936	22 years, 74 days	Broadway Arena, New York City, New York, U.S.	
57	Win	50–2–5	Frankie Klick	PTS	10	Jan 3, 1936	22 years, 56 days	Madison Square Garden, New York City, New York, U.S.	
56	Win	49–2–5	Lou Jallos	TKO	3 (10)	Dec 20, 1935	22 years, 42 days	Arena, Syracuse, New York, U.S.	
55	Win	48–2–5	Jimmy Vaughn	PTS	8	Dec 16, 1935	22 years, 38 days	Public Hall, Cleveland, Ohio, U.S.	
54	Win	47–2–5	George Levy	PTS	10	Nov 25, 1935	22 years, 17 days	Laurel Garden, Newark, New Jersey, U.S.	
53	Win	46–2–5	Fritzie Zivic	UD	10	Jul 1, 1935	21 years, 235 days	Hickey Park, Millvale, Pennsylvania, U.S.	
52	Loss	45–2–5	Tony Canzoneri	UD	15	May 10, 1935	21 years, 183 days	Madison Square Garden, New York City, New York, U.S.	For vacant NYSAC, NBA, and The Ring lightweight titles
51	Win	45–1–5	Honeyboy Hughes	TKO	4 (10)	Apr 24, 1935	21 years, 167 days	Providence, Rhode Island, U.S	
50	Win	44–1–5	Sammy Fuller	UD	15	Mar 1, 1935	21 years, 113 days	Madison Square Garden, New York City, New York, U.S.	
49	Win	43–1–5	Harry Dublinsky	UD	10	Jan 11, 1935	21 years, 64 days	Madison Square Garden, New York City, New York, U.S.	
48	Win	42–1–5	Pancho Villa	PTS	10	Dec 28, 1934	21 years, 50 days	Casino, Fall River, Massachusetts, U.S.	
47	Win	41–1–5	Mickey Paul	KO	1 (10)	Dec 17, 1934	21 years, 39 days	Convention Hall, Utica, New York, U.S.	
46	Win	40–1–5	Billy Hogan	PTS	10	Sep 26, 1934	20 years, 322 days	South Park Arena, Hartford, Connecticut, U.S.	
45	Win	39–1–5	Tony Herrera	PTS	10	Aug 29, 1934	20 years, 294 days	South Park Arena, Hartford, Connecticut, U.S.	
44	Win	38–1–5	Roger Bernard	PTS	10	Jul 11, 1934	20 years, 245 days	South Park Arena, Hartford, Connecticut, U.S.	
43	Win	37–1–5	Phil Rafferty	TKO	8 (10)	Jun 28, 1934	20 years, 232 days	South Park Arena, Hartford, Connecticut, U.S.	
42	Draw	36–1–5	Jimmy Leto	PTS	10	Jun 18, 1934	20 years, 222 days	South Park Arena, Hartford, Connecticut, U.S.	
41	Draw	36–1–4	Steve Halaiko	PTS	10	May 25, 1934	20 years, 198 days	Rhode Island Auditorium, Providence, Rhode Island, U.S.	
40	Win	36–1–3	Jackie Davis	KO	4 (10)	May 18, 1934	20 years, 191 days	Rhode Island Auditorium, Providence, Rhode Island, U.S.	
39	Loss	35–1–3	Steve Halaiko	MD	6	May 7, 1934	20 years, 180 days	Arena, Syracuse, New York, U.S.	
38	Win	35–0–3	Billy Lynch	TKO	9 (10)	Apr 26, 1934	20 years, 169 days	Providence, Rhode Island, U.S.	
37	Win	34–0–3	Eddie Dempsey	KO	3 (6)	Apr 16, 1934	20 years, 159 days	State Armory, Mohawk, New York, U.S.	
36	Win	33–0–3	Johnny Jadick	UD	10	Mar 19, 1934	20 years, 131 days	Valley Arena, Holyoke, Massachusetts, U.S.	
35	Win	32–0–3	Tommy Bashara	KO	2 (10)	Mar 12, 1934	20 years, 124 days	Arena, Philadelphia, Pennsylvania, U.S.	
34	Win	31–0–3	Tommy Romano	PTS	10	Mar 2, 1934	20 years, 114 days	Rhode Island Auditorium, Providence, Rhode Island, U.S.	
33	Win	30–0–3	Paris Apice	PTS	10	Jan 24, 1934	20 years, 77 days	Rhode Island Auditorium, Providence, Rhode Island, U.S.	
32	Win	29–0–3	Patsy LaRocco	TKO	7 (10)	Jan 8, 1934	20 years, 61 days	Valley Arena, Holyoke, Massachusetts, U.S.	
31	Win	28–0–3	Young Joe Firpo	PTS	10	Dec 25, 1933	20 years, 47 days	Arena, Philadelphia, Pennsylvania, U.S.	
30	Win	27–0–3	Cocoa Kid	PTS	10	Dec 5, 1933	20 years, 27 days	Rhode Island Auditorium, Providence, Rhode Island, U.S.	
29	Win	26–0–3	Stanley Winneryk	TKO	2 (6)	Nov 27, 1933	20 years, 19 days	Arena, Philadelphia, Pennsylvania, U.S.	
28	Win	25–0–3	Paris Apice	PTS	10	Oct 30, 1933	19 years, 356 days	Valley Arena, Holyoke, Massachusetts, U.S.	
27	Win	24–0–3	Phil Rafferty	PTS	10	Oct 23, 1933	19 years, 349 days	Valley Arena, Holyoke, Massachusetts, U.S.	
26	Win	23–0–3	Johnny Gaito	PTS	10	Oct 9, 1933	19 years, 305 days	Valley Arena, Holyoke, Massachusetts, U.S.	
25	Win	22–0–3	Stanley Krannenberg	PTS	8	Sep 25, 1933	19 years, 321 days	Englewood Arena, Englewood, New Jersey, U.S.	
24	Win	21–0–3	Joey Costa	PTS	6	Sep 12, 1933	19 years, 308 days	Polo Grounds, New York City, New York, U.S.	
23	Draw	20–0–3	Charley Badami	PTS	6	Aug 29, 1933	19 years, 294 days	Fugazy Bowl, New York City, New York, U.S.	
22	Win	20–0–2	Honey Mellody	UD	10	Aug 14, 1933	19 years, 279 days	Heywood Arena, West Springfield, Massachusetts, U.S.	
21	Win	19–0–2	Jack Rose	PTS	4	Aug 9, 1933	19 years, 274 days	Polo Grounds, New York City, New York, U.S.	
20	Win	18–0–2	Roland LeCuyer	TKO	3 (6)	Jul 31, 1933	19 years, 265 days	Heywood Arena, West Springfield, Massachusetts, U.S.	
19	Win	17–0–2	Al Pieretti	KO	3 (6)	Jul 17, 1933	19 years, 251 days	Englewood Arena, Englewood, New Jersey, U.S.	
18	Win	16–0–2	Patsy LaRocco	PTS	6	Jul 13, 1933	19 years, 247 days	Fugazy Bowl, New York City, New York, U.S.	
17	Win	15–0–2	Ernie Tedesco	NWS	6	Jul 3, 1933	19 years, 237 days	Englewood Arena, Englewood, New Jersey, U.S.	
16	Win	14–0–2	Tony Scarpati	PTS	6	Jun 27, 1933	19 years, 231 days	Fugazy Bowl, New York City, New York, U.S.	
15	Win	13–0–2	Tommy Barredo	KO	2 (?)	May 22, 1933	19 years, 195 days	Jamaica Arena, New York City, New York, U.S.	
14	Win	12–0–2	Frankie Wallace	PTS	6	Apr 27, 1933	19 years, 170 days	Convention Hall, Utica, New York, U.S.	
13	Win	11–0–2	Freddie Mitchell	UD	6	Apr 24, 1933	19 years, 167 days	Knights of Columbus Hall, Utica, New York, U.S.	
12	Draw	10–0–2	Charley Badami	PTS	6	Apr 3, 1933	19 years, 146 days	Jamaica Arena, New York City, New York, U.S.	
11	Win	10–0–1	Paul Scalfaro	PTS	5	Mar 20, 1933	19 years, 132 days	Jamaica Arena, New York City, New York, U.S.	
10	Win	9–0–1	Pedro Nieves	PTS	5	Feb 27, 1933	19 years, 111 days	New York Coliseum, New York City, New York, U.S.	
9	Win	8–0–1	Joey Kolba	PTS	6	Feb 20, 1933	19 years, 104 days	Utica, New York, U.S.	
8	Win	7–0–1	Ripper Martin	PTS	6	Jan 24, 1933	19 years, 77 days	Convention Hall, Utica, New York, U.S.	
7	Win	6–0–1	Johnny Clarey	TKO	5 (6)	Jan 17, 1933	19 years, 70 days	Convention Hall, Utica, New York, U.S.	
6	Win	5–0–1	Jerry White	KO	4 (6)	Nov 18, 1932	19 years, 10 days	Carlstadt, New Jersey, U.S.	
5	Draw	4–0–1	Phil Stark	PTS	6	Nov 14, 1932	19 years, 6 days	New York Coliseum, New York City, New York, U.S.	
4	Win	4–0	Ray Meyers	PTS	5	Jul 26, 1932	18 years, 261 days	New Lenox S.C., New York, U.S.	
3	Win	3–0	Mel Doty	NWS	6	Sep 6, 1932	18 years, 303 days	Englewood Arena, Englewood, New Jersey, U.S.	
2	Win	2–0	Joe Pelicano	PTS	6	Jul 14, 1932	18 years, 249 days	Fort Hamilton Arena, New York City, New York, U.S.	
1	Win	1–0	Frankie Curry	TKO	3 (4)	Jun 9, 1932	18 years, 214 days	Fort Hamilton Arena, New York City, New York, U.S.	

== Titles in boxing ==
=== Major world titles ===
- NYSAC lightweight champion (135 lbs) (2×)
- NBA (WBA) lightweight champion (135 lbs) (2×)

=== The Ring magazine titles ===
- The Ring lightweight champion (135 lbs) (2×)

=== Undisputed titles ===
- Undisputed lightweight champion (2×)

== See also ==
- Lineal championship
- List of lightweight boxing champions

Sporting positions
World boxing titles
Preceded by Tony Canzoneri	NYSAC lightweight champion September 3, 1936 – August 17, 1938	Succeeded by Henry Armstrong
Preceded by Tony Canzoneri	NBA lightweight champion September 3, 1936 – August 17, 1938	Succeeded by Henry Armstrong
Preceded by Tony Canzoneri	The Ring lightweight champion September 3, 1936 – August 17, 1938	Succeeded by Henry Armstrong
Preceded by Tony Canzoneri	Undisputed lightweight champion September 3, 1936 – August 17, 1938	Succeeded by Henry Armstrong
Preceded by Henry Armstrong	NYSAC lightweight champion May 31, 1938 – October 4, 1940	Succeeded by Lew Jenkins
Preceded by Henry Armstrong	NBA lightweight champion May 31, 1938 – October 4, 1940	Succeeded by Lew Jenkins
Preceded by Henry Armstrong	The Ring lightweight champion August 22, 1939 – May 10, 1940	Succeeded by Lew Jenkins
Preceded by Henry Armstrong	Undisputed lightweight champion August 22, 1939 – May 10, 1940	Succeeded by Lew Jenkins
