= Coney Island Velodrome =

Arena in Brooklyn, New York (closed 1950)

Coordinates: 40°34′40″N 73°58′50″W

A Communist Party USA rally held at the Velodrome, May 25, 1941

The Coney Island Velodrome was a mid-sized sports arena in Coney Island, Brooklyn, New York City. Designed as a bicycle racing venue, the drome featured a 1/8-mile (0.20 km) wooden oval track with 45° banked corners and seating for 10,000. It also hosted outboard midgets into 1939. Located next to the Culver Depot, the Brooklyn–Manhattan Transit Corporation's rail terminal at Neptune Avenue & West 12th Street, the venue played host to sports ranging from motorcycle races to boxing and football.

The drome was a popular venue for both Coney Island vacationers and New York City residents. At the height of popularity for both American bicycle racing and boxing in the 1920s, Coney Island drome was host to regional and state championship bicycle races, and boxing heroes including Rocky Marciano, Joe Louis, Jersey Joe Walcott, and Sugar Ray Robinson.

As the Great Depression began, bicycle racing on the Eastern Seaboard collapsed. On August 3, 1930, the velodrome was destroyed by fire but due to its location and use was rebuilt. The last event was an Old-Timers reunion and bicycle race on September 4, 1950. Coney Island Velodrome was torn down and replaced with high-rise housing.

Included in the New York City bid for the 2012 Summer Olympics were plans to build another velodrome elsewhere on Coney Island. These plans were scrapped when New York lost the bid to London in 2005.
