= Culver Park =

Sports field in Ludington, Michigan, US

Coordinates: 43°57′13.8″N 86°27′14.3″W

Culver Park was the park located in Ludington, Michigan, during the early 20th century that was used, among other things, as the local fair grounds. Culver Park was the home field for the Ludington Mariners during the late 1910s and early to mid-1920s. The park was demolished sometime after 1931 and is now the site of the Ludington Municipal Marina.
