= Deaths in September 1988 =

The following is a list of notable deaths in September 1988.

Entries for each day are listed alphabetically by surname. A typical entry lists information in the following sequence:

- Name, age, country of citizenship at birth, subsequent country of citizenship (if applicable), reason for notability, cause of death (if known), and reference.

== September 1988 ==
=== 1 ===
- Luis Walter Alvarez, 77, American physicist, Nobel laureate in Physics (Alvarez hypothesis), esophageal cancer.
- Kenichi Furuya, 75, Japanese Olympic ice hockey player (1936).
- Fatehsinghrao Gaekwad, 58, Indian politician and cricketer, Maharaja of Baroda, member of Lok Sabha.
- Hugh Hunt, 86, American set decorator (Ben-Hur, Julius Caesar).
- Gerald Mast, 48, American author and film historian, AIDS.
- Robert Menaker, 84, American exporter, allegedly worked for Soviet intelligence during World War II.
- Esmeralda Ruspoli, 60, Italian actress (Seven Seas to Calais, Romeo and Juliet).
- Leonor Sullivan, 86, American politician, member of the U.S. House of Representatives (1953–1977), heart failure.

=== 2 ===
- Alexander Aigner, 79, Austrian mathematician (Cipher Department of the High Command of the Wehrmacht).
- Dorothy Crawford, 77, Australian actress, co-founded Crawford Productions with her brother Hector Crawford.
- Jim Bagby Jr., 71, American Major League baseball player (Cleveland Indians).
- Heinz Förstendorf, 80, German Olympic field hockey player (1928).
- Erik Frey, 80, Austrian film actor.
- Bill Northam, 82, Australian businessman and Olympic sailor (1964).
- Marshall Riddle, 70, American Negro Leagues baseball player.
- Gibril Sesay, 79, Sierra Leonean diplomat, ambassador to Egypt.
- Robert Watts, 65, American artist, lung cancer.
- Bert White, 81, Australian rules footballer.

=== 3 ===
- Bob Bonte, 59, Dutch Olympic swimmer (1948).
- John Goodison, 44–45, English rock musician, songwriter and record producer ("Give a Little Love"), heart attack.
- Ferit Melen, 81, Turkish politician, Prime Minister of Turkey, heart condition.
- Ewing Mitchell, 77, American actor (Sky King, The Adventures of Champion), stroke.
- Ferenc Sas, 73, Hungarian international footballer (Hungária MTK, Hungary).
- Bibi Torriani, 76, Swiss ice hockey player and Olympic medalist (1928, 1936, 1948).

=== 4 ===
- Joseph Ceravolo, 54, American poet, bile duct cancer.
- Dick Clark, 44, American ABA player (Minnesota Muskies, Houston Mavericks).
- Carlos García, 86, Chilean footballer.
- Leonard Huxley, 86, English-born Australian physicist, Rhodes Scholar.

=== 5 ===
- Ramchandra Dhondiba Bhandare, 72, Indian politician, Governor of Andhra Pradesh.
- Lawrence Brown, 81, American jazz trombonist (Duke Ellington orchestra), stroke.
- Gert Fröbe, 75, German actor (Goldfinger, Those Magnificent Men in Their Flying Machines), heart attack.
- Boris Smyslovsky, 90, Russian-Finnish general.

=== 6 ===
- Leroy Brown, 37, American professional wrestler, stroke.
- Frank Burke, 69, American officer in the U.S. Army, Medal of Honor recipient.
- Rudolf Falk, 90, Swedish Olympic long-distance runner (1920).
- Autry Inman, 59, American country and rockabilly musician.
- Lew Krausse Sr., 76, American MLB player (Philadelphia Athletics) and scout.
- Myrtle Byram McGraw, 89, American psychologist and neurobiologist, pneumonia.
- Harold Rosson, 93, American cinematographer (The Wizard of Oz, Singin' in the Rain).
- Karni Singh, 64, Indian Maharaja of Bikaner, member of Lok Sabha.
- Dan Spring, 77, Irish Labour Party politician (Teachta Dála) and Gaelic footballer (Kerry).
- Stefan Themerson, 78, Polish-English writer of children's literature, poet and novelist.
- Vojtěch Věchet, 76, Czech footballer.
- Julie Ward, 28, British murder victim.

=== 7 ===
- Abdul Haq Akorwi, 76, Pakistani Islamic scholar and politician (National Assembly).
- Gaja Alaga, 64, Croatian theoretical physicist (nuclear physics).
- Raymond Dubly, 94, French Olympic footballer (1920, 1924).
- Sedad Hakkı Eldem, 80, Turkish architect (Istanbul Justice Palace).
- Vivi Janiss, 77, American actress (The Phantom from 10,000 Leagues, Man on the Prowl, First, You Cry).
- Bill Lumsden, 63, Australian rules footballer.
- Thelma Payne, 92, American Olympic diver (1920).

=== 8 ===
- Janine Balding, 20, Australian murder victim.
- G. M. Durrani, 68–69, Indian radio drama artist, playback singer and actor.
- Fred Hawking, 78, Australian rules footballer.
- Rats Henderson, 91, American Negro League baseball player.
- Danny Livingstone, 54, Antiguan cricketer.

=== 9 ===
- Mona Best, 64, Indian-born British owner of the Casbah Coffee Club, mother of Pete Best, heart attack.
- Leroy McGuirk, 77, American professional wrestler and promoter.
- Albert Taylor, 77, Canadian Olympic rower (1932).

=== 10 ===
- Joaquim Pedro de Andrade, 56, Brazilian film director and screenwriter (Macunaíma).
- Jaclyn Dowaliby, 7, American murder victim.
- Russ Elliott, 70, Australian rules footballer.
- Jam Ghulam Qadir Khan, 68, Pakistani Chief Minister of Balochistan, heart failure.
- Virginia Satir, 72, American author and psychotherapist, pancreatic cancer.

=== 11 ===
- Vincas Bartuška, 87, Lithuanian Olympic footballer (1924).
- Wilhelm Batz, 72, Nazi German Luftwaffe fighter ace.
- Roger Hargreaves, 53, British cartoonist, illustrator and writer of children's books (Mr. Men Little Miss, Timbuctoo), stroke.
- Julius Mackerle, 79, Czech inventor and automobile engineer.
- Fiqrete Shehu, 68, Albanian politician, wife of Prime Minister Mehmet Shehu.
- John Sylvester White, 68, American actor (Welcome Back, Kotter).

=== 12 ===
- Alan Bible, 78, American lawyer and politician, Nevada Attorney General, United States Senator (1954–1974), respiratory illness.
- Hans Frei, 66, American biblical scholar, stroke.
- Stephen B. Grimes, 61, English production designer and art director (Out of Africa).
- Ferd Hayward, 77, Canadian Olympic athlete (1952).
- Margaret McFarland, 83, American child psychologist, consultant to TV show Mister Rogers' Neighborhood, myelofibrosis.
- Bill Mitchell, 76, American automobile designer (General Motors), heart failure.
- John D. J. Moore, 77, American lawyer and business executive, ambassador to Ireland, bone cancer.
- Lauris Norstad, 81, American general in the US Army and Air Force, cardiac arrest.
- Charlie Palmieri, 60, Puerto Rican bandleader, heart attack.
- Mars Ravelo, 71, Filipino comic book cartoonist and graphic novelist, heart attack.

=== 13 ===
- Julian Banzon, 80, Filipino biochemist (alternative fuels).
- Gerd Hornberger, 78. German sprinter and Olympic medalist (1936).
- Christian Kampmann, 49, Danish writer and journalist, murdered.
- Peter Young, 73, British Army officer and military historian, founded The Sealed Knot.

=== 14 ===
- Donald Albery, 74, English theatre impresario, director and administrator of the London Festival Ballet.
- Maurice Allard, 66, Canadian politician, member of the Canada House of Commons (1958–1962, 1965–1968).
- William Edward Cousins, 86, American Roman Catholic bishop, Archbishop of Milwaukee.
- Roy Dutton, 71, British Royal Air Force officer and flying ace.
- Louis Quinn, 73, American television and film actor (77 Sunset Strip).

=== 15 ===
- Samuel E. Beetley, 74, American film editor (The Longest Day, Doctor Dolittle).
- George Hendricks Beverley, 91, American Air Force officer.
- Billy Bischoff, 75, Australian rugby league footballer.
- Frank Francis, 86, English academic librarian and curator (British Museum).
- Ludovic Franck, 80, Belgian Olympic sailor (1928, 1948).
- Henry Wallich, 74, German-born American economist, columnist for Newsweek magazine, member of the Federal Reserve Board of Governors.

=== 16 ===
- Axel von Ambesser, 78, German playwright, actor and film director.
- Becky Bell, 17, American teenage girl, septic abortion.
- Hans Höfner, 75, Austrian Olympic cyclist (1936).
- Max Loehr, 84, German art historian and professor of Chinese art, Parkinson's disease.
- Richard Paul Lohse, 86, Swiss painter and graphic artist.
- Artur Nielsen, 93, Danish Olympic long-distance runner (1920).
- Dick Pym, 95, English international footballer (Bolton Wanderers, England).
- Ramon S. Subejano, 82–83, Filipino-American soldier.
- Bob Trice, 62, American Major League baseball player (Philadelphia / Kansas City Athletics).

=== 17 ===
- Nellie Beer, 88, British politician, Lord Mayor of Manchester.
- Sir John Biggs-Davison, 70, British politician, Member of Parliament.
- Walter P. Chrysler Jr., 79, American art collector and theatre and film producer (Chrysler Museum of Art), cancer.
- Roman Davydov, 75, Soviet animator and artist (Adventures of Mowgli).
- Beulah Mae Donald, 67, American woman who successfully sued the Ku Klux Klan.
- Hilde Güden, 71, Austrian soprano (Vienna State Opera).
- Nat Jackley, 79, English comic actor, cancer.
- Emment Kapengwe, 45, Zambian footballer (Aston Villa, Zambia), stroke.
- Rowena Reed Kostellow, 88, American industrial designer and professor (Pratt Institute), heart attack.
- Red Weiner, 77, American NFL player (Philadelphia Eagles).
- Helena Kalokuokamaile Wilcox, 71, aspirant head of the royal family of the Kingdom of Hawaii.

=== 18 ===
- Ho Chong, 92, South Korean politician, President of South Korea.
- Kathleen Collins, 46, American poet, filmmaker and civil rights activist (Losing Ground), breast cancer.
- David Dodd, 93, American financial analyst and author (Security Analysis), respiratory failure.
- John Elliot, 90, British transport and railway manager (Southern Railway, British Railways).
- Albert E. Jenner Jr., 81, American lawyer, assistant counsel to Warren Commission, Watergate counsel, neurological disease.
- David McFall, 68, Scottish sculptor.
- Svend Møllnitz, 91, Danish footballer.
- Michel Ravarino, 82, Monegasque architect and Olympic sports shooter (1936, 1948, 1960).a
- Mohammad-Hossein Shahriar, 82, Iranian poet (Heydar Babaya Salam).
- Alan Watt, 87, Australian diplomat, secretary of the Department of External Affairs.

=== 19 ===
- P. Shilu Ao, 71, Indian politician, Chief Minister of Nagaland.
- Michael Fessier, 82, American screenwriter and film producer.
- P. A. P. Moran, 71, Australian statistician (probability theory, population and evolutionary genetics), stroke.
- Eduard Pestel, 74, German industrial designer, economist and politician.
- Win Maw Oo, 16, Burmese student activist, killed during the 8888 uprising.

=== 20 ===
- Harold Britt, 77, Australian cricketer.
- Tim Davis, 44, American drummer, singer and songwriter, co-founded the Steve Miller Band, diabetes.
- Herbert Francis, 48, American Olympic cyclist (1960).
- Roy Kinnear, 54, English actor and comedian (Willy Wonka & the Chocolate Factory), heart attack following horse fall.
- Eileen O'Faolain, 88, Irish writer of children's books, stroke.
- Walter Reckless, 89, American criminologist (containment theory).
- Doris Wells, 44, Venezuelan actress, writer and producer.
- Sam Woodyard, 63, American jazz drummer, cancer.

=== 21 ===
- Rudi Alvađ, 59, Serbian half of comedy duo Momo and Uzeir.
- Harold Balfour, 90, British politician, Member of Parliament, Under-Secretary of State for Air.
- Ned Brennan, 68, Irish politician, member of the Dáil Éireann (1982).
- Glenn Robert Davis, 73, American politician, member of the U.S. House of Representatives (1947–1957, 1965–1974).
- Robert Gwathmey, 85, American painter, Parkinson's disease.
- Henry Koster, 83, German-American film director, liver cancer.
- Christine Norden, 63, British actress (An Ideal Husband, Mine Own Executioner), pneumonia.
- George Peters, 76, Australian rules footballer.
- S. B. P. Pattabhirama Rao, 76, Indian politician, member of Lok Sabha.
- Zubeida, 76–77, Indian actress (Alam Ara, Devdas).

=== 22 ===
- Rais Amrohvi, 74, Pakistani scholar, poet and psychoanalyst, assassinated.
- Bert Corley, 68, American football player (Buffalo Bills, Baltimore Colts).
- Maximilian von Fürstenberg, 83, Dutch-Belgian Roman Catholic cardinal, cerebral hemorrhage.
- Kenneth Higson, 54, Canadian politician, member of the House of Commons of Canada (1972–1974, 1979).

=== 23 ===
- Mary Colvin, 80, English director of the Women's Royal Army Corps.
- Tom Hawkins, 61, American writer, probable author of the Wanda Tinasky letters, murder-suicide.
- Arwel Hughes, 79, Welsh orchestral conductor and composer.
- Trilok Kapoor, 76, Indian actor.
- Phil Leslie, 79, American comedy writer, cancer.
- Lyell McEwin, 91, Australian politician, president of the South Australian Legislative Council.
- Tibor Sekelj, 76, Hungarian-born Yugoslav polyglot and world-traveller.

=== 24 ===
- Aziz Suryal Atiya, 90, Egyptian Coptic historian, founder of the Institute of Coptic Studies.
- Basil de Ferranti, 58, British businessman and politician, member of the House of Commons, cancer.
- Nancy Hale, 80, American novelist (The Prodigal Women), stroke.
- Joe Don Looney, 45, American NFL footballer (Detroit Lions, Washington Redskins), motorcycle accident.
- Arthur McCashin, 79, American Olympic equestrian (1952).
- Shamsul Huda Panchbagi, 90–91, Bangladeshi Islamic scholar and politician, member of the Bengal Legislative Assembly.
- Osvaldo Toriani, 51, Argentine footballer.

=== 25 ===
- bpNichol, 43, Canadian poet and writer.
- James L. Buie, 68, American scientist and inventor (transistor–transistor logic), emphysema.
- Billy Carter, 51, American farmer, businessman and politician, brother of Jimmy Carter, pancreatic cancer.
- Paul Collins, 80, American NFL player (Boston Braves/Redskins).
- Nipper Pat Daly, 75, British boxer.
- Francis DeSales, 76, American actor (Two Faces West, The Adventures of Ozzie and Harriet), cancer.
- Antonino Saetta, 65, Italian magistrate, assassinated.
- Arthur Võõbus, 79, Estonian theologian.

=== 26 ===
- Guillermo Battaglia, 88, Argentine film actor (La Historia Oficial), heart attack.
- Alister Clarke, 71, Australian rugby league player (St. George, Canterbury).
- Paul Cowan, 48, American journalist (The Village Voice), leukemia.
- Bruce Haack, 57, Canadian musician and composer, heart failure.
- Frank Holden, 75, Australian rules footballer.
- Lincoln Hudson, 72, U.S. Army Air Force officer in World War II.
- Lord Melody, 62, Trinidadian singer ("Shame and Scandal"), cancer.
- Sergey Shcherbakov, 26–27, Soviet serial killer, executed.
- Branko Zebec, 59, Croatian international footballer (Partizan Belgrade, Yugoslavia), alcohol-related illness.

=== 27 ===
- Teofilo Camomot, 74, Filipino Roman Catholic Archbishop, car accident.
- Demetrius Comino, 85, Australian engineer and inventor (Slotted angle), founded the Comino Foundation, heart attack.
- Willis Edwards, 85, English international footballer (Leeds United, England).
- George Grant, 69, Canadian philosopher and professor.
- J. C. Heard, 71, American swing, bop and blues drummer, heart attack.
- Ken McIver, 59, Australian politician, member of the Parliament of Western Australia.
- Paul Reinman, 78, American comic book artist (The Incredible Hulk, X-Men).
- William V. Shannon, 61, American journalist and author, ambassador to Ireland, lymphoma.

=== 28 ===
- Fernie Blade, 78, Australian cricketer.
- Margerie Bonner, 83, American actress, scriptwriter and novelist, wife of Malcolm Lowry.
- Frank Caplan, 77, English-born American toy collector and manufacturer, pneumonia.
- Ethel Grandin, 94, American silent-screen actress.
- Mervyn Hutton, 77, Australian cricketer.
- Charles R. Jonas, 83, American politician, Member of the U.S. House of Representatives (1953–1973), heart failure.
- Beldon Katleman, 74, American businessman (El Rancho Vegas).
- Vicko Krstulović, 83, Yugoslav communist politician, President of the Presidium of the Croatian Parliament.
- John Robinson, 79, English cricketer.

=== 29 ===
- Charles Addams, 76, American cartoonist (The Addams Family), heart attack.
- Barney Josephson, 86, American founder of Café Society in New York, hemorrhage.
- Raúl Landini, 79, Argentine Olympic boxer (1928).
- Tony Ordeñana, 69, Cuban MLB player (Pittsburgh Pirates).
- Vernon Smith, 80, American college football player (Georgia Bulldogs).

=== 30 ===
- Chick Chandler, 83, American film actor (Soldiers of Fortune), heart attack.
- Al Holbert, 41, American car racing driver, aeroplane crash.
- Dhulappa Bhaurao Navale, 78, Indian freedom fighter.
- Louis Power, 82, Australian cricketer.
- Joachim Prinz, 86, German-American rabbi, heart attack.
- Chino Roces, 75, Filipino businessman and newspaper owner and publisher (The Manila Times), cancer.
- David E. Satterfield III, 67, American lawyer and politician, member of the U.S. House of Representatives (1965–1981), heart failure.
- Eddie Shimwell, 68, English international footballer (Blackpool).
- Muriel S. Snowden, 72, American founder and director of Freedom House, cancer.
- Joseph Albert Sullivan, 87, Canadian Olympic ice hockey player (1928), and Senator (1957–1985).
- Sivert Todal, 86, Norwegian politician.
- Trường Chinh, 81, Vietnamese communist political leader, President of Vietnam, fall.

=== Unknown date ===
- Harry Jeffra, 73, American boxer, world bantamweight and featherweight champion.
- Prentice Moreland, 63, American R&B singer.
