= Roquemore =

Roquemore is a surname of French origins, and may refer to:

- Cliff Roquemore (1948–2002), American writer, producer and director
- Durwood Roquemore (born 1960), American professional football player
- Henry Roquemore (1886–1943), American character actor
- John D. Roquemore (1846–1900), American politician, Confederate veteran
- O. G. Roquemore (1856–1925; born Otho Gibson Roquemore), American architect in Texas
- Larry Roquemore (1938–2016), American dancer, actor, singer, and choreographer
- Rocky Roquemore (born 1948), American golf course architect
- Xosha Roquemore (born 1984) American actress

== See also ==
- Roquemaure (disambiguation)
