= List of people from Amarillo, Texas =

This is a list of Amarilloans, notable current and former citizens of Amarillo, Texas.

== Arts and entertainment ==
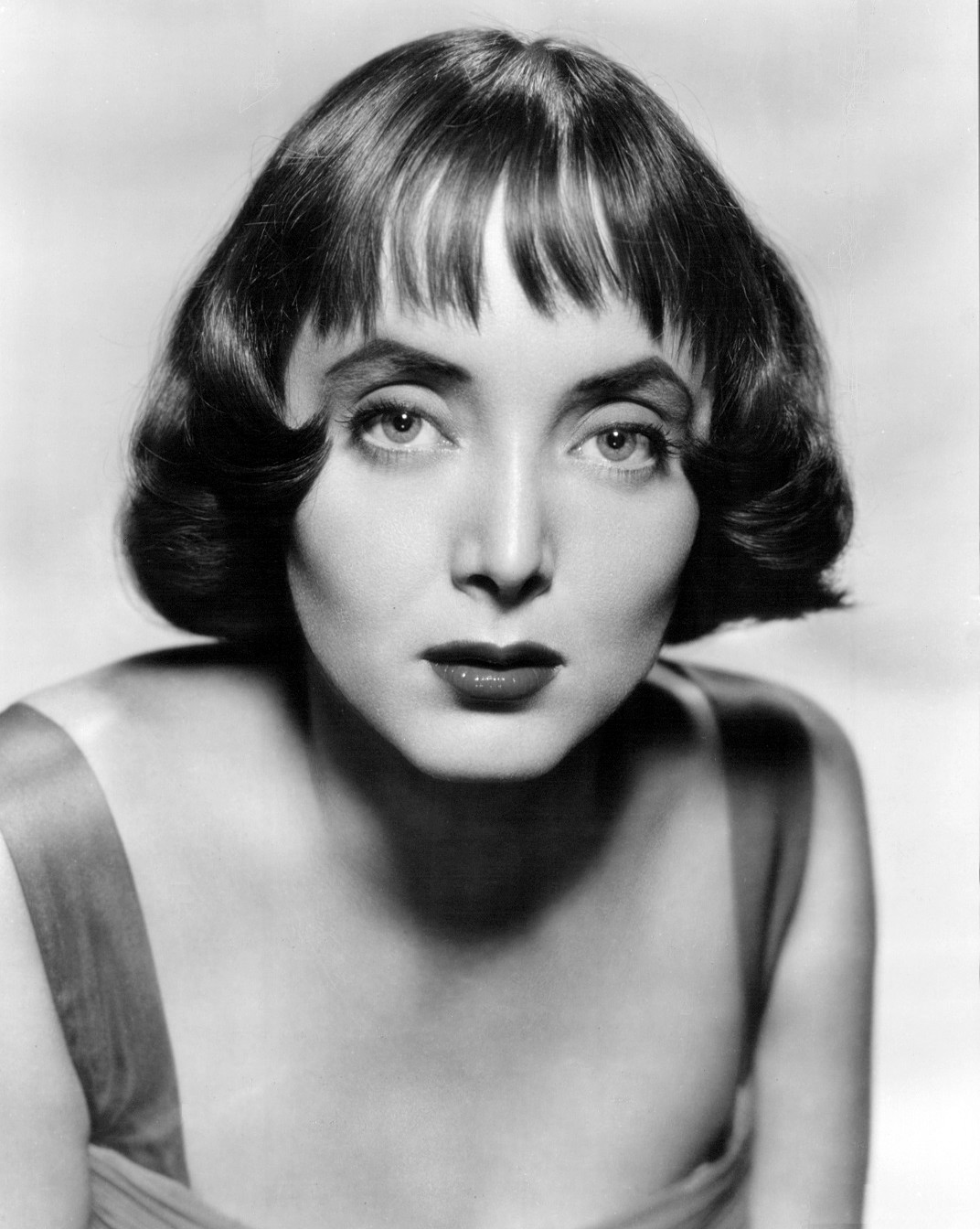
Actress Carolyn Jones, best known for The Addams Family

- Jennifer Archer, author
- Art Bell, radio host and author
- Lacey Brown, folk singer and American Idol finalist
- Gail Caldwell, Pulitzer Prize-winning book critic
- Derek Cecil, actor (Push, Nevada)
- Cyd Charisse, dancer and actress (The Band Wagon, Brigadoon)
- Arden Cho, actress (Kpop Demon Hunters)
- Ann Doran, actress (Rebel Without a Cause)
- Joe Ely, country and folk singer
- Ron Ely, actor (Tarzan)
- Todd English, celebrity chef
- Kevin Fowler, country music singer
- Blair Garner, country music radio host
- Jimmy Gilmer, rock singer ("Sugar Shack")
- Jimmie Dale Gilmore, country music singer
- Clyde Kenneth Harris, soldier and interior decorator
- Kimberly Willis Holt, author
- Mitchell Hurwitz, TV writer
- Sterling Hyltin, ballet dancer
- Carolyn Jones, actress (The Addams Family)
- Kristin Key, comedian
- Roger Miller, country music singer
- Harry Northup, actor and poet
- Grady Nutt, comedian (Hee Haw)
- Hayden Pedigo, musician
- John Rich, guitar player
- Eck Robertson, musician
- O. G. Roquemore, architect
- Ben Sargent, Pulitzer Prize-winning editorial cartoonist
- George Saunders, writer, winner of Macarthur Fellowship Genius Grant
- JD Souther, country rock singer
- Terry LaVerne Stafford, songwriter
- Francie Swift, actress
- Jodi Thomas, author
- Paula Trickey, actress (Pacific Blue)
- Aaron Watson, country music singer
- Trent Willmon, country music singer
- Jack Wrather, television director
- M. K. Wren, mystery and science fiction writer

== Business ==
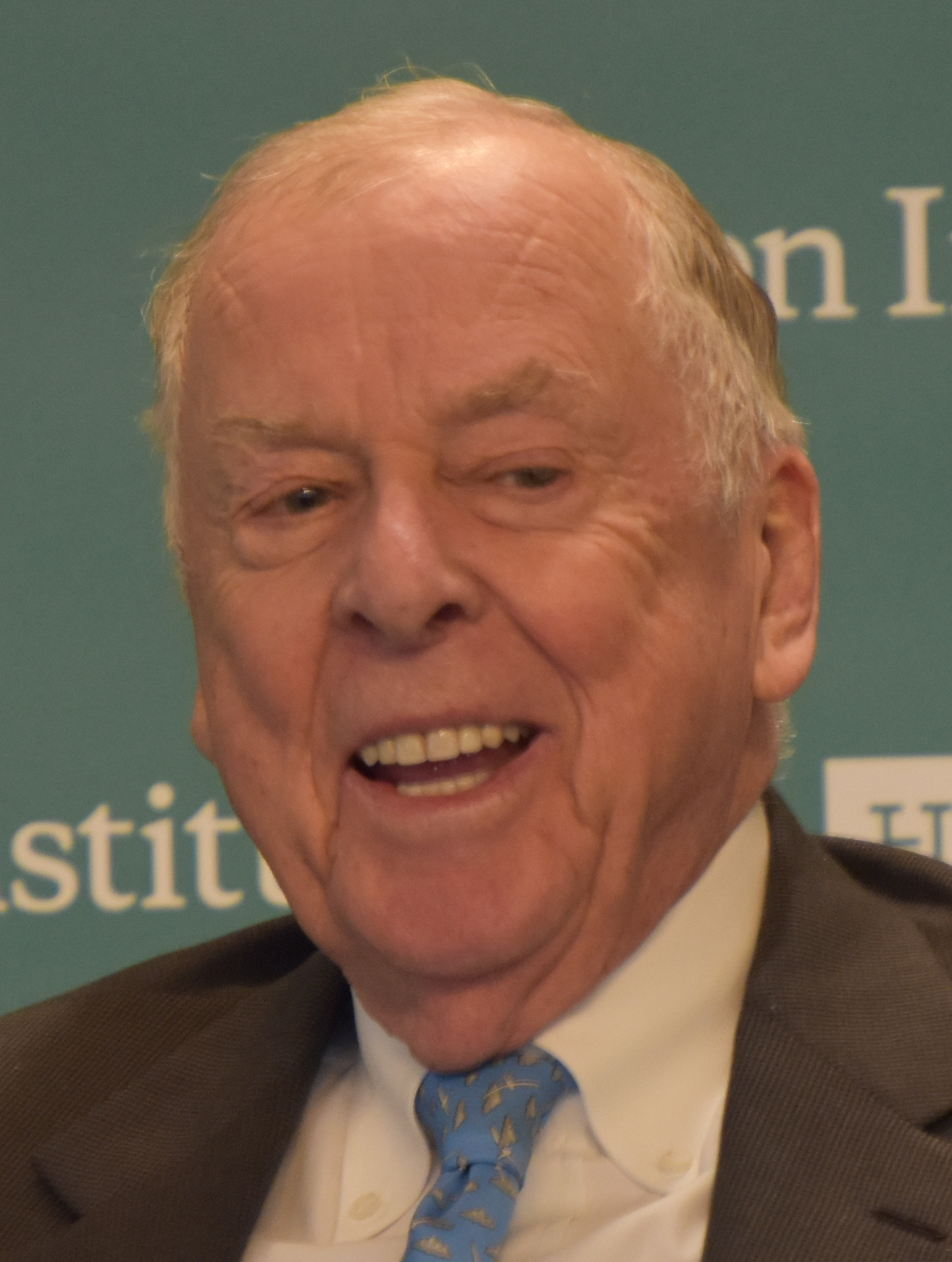
Businessman T. Boone Pickens

- T. Boone Pickens, Jr., oilman and philanthropist

== Law and government ==
- James R. Beverley, governor of Puerto Rico
- Teel Bivins, United States ambassador to Sweden
- Beau Boulter, United States congressman
- James Nathan Browning, Texas lieutenant governor
- Odell M. Conoley, USMC; deputy director for Operations, Plans, Policies and Operations Division, Staff of the Commander in Chief, United States European Command
- Jake Ellzey, United States congressman
- William Willard Gibson Jr., lawyer and academic
- Howard D. Graves, superintendent of the U.S. Military Academy at West Point, later Chancellor of Texas A & M system of universities
- Ronny Jackson, United States congressman and former Physician to the President and nominee for U.S. Secretary of Veterans Affairs
- John Marvin Jones, United States congressman and chief judge of the Court of Claims
- Walter Thomas Price, IV, Amarillo attorney and Republican nominee for the District 87 seat in the Texas House of Representatives
- Mary Lou Robinson, United States federal judge
- Kel Seliger, mayor and Texas state senator
- Jasmine Taylor, businesswoman

== Sports ==
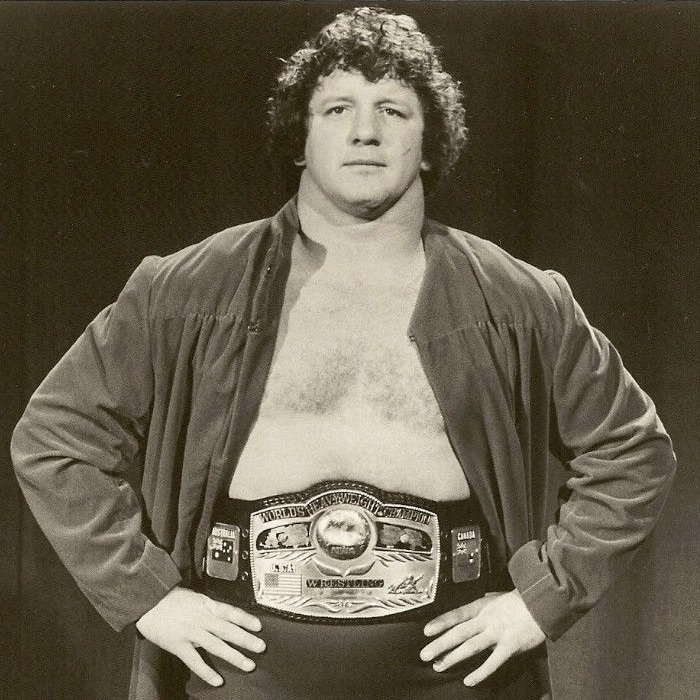
Professional wrestler Terry Funk

- Rex Baxter, professional golfer and NCAA champion
- Trevor Brazile, PRCA All Around Cowboy
- Brad Bryant, professional golfer
- Paul Buentello, mixed martial artist
- Steve Butler, racecar driver
- Ron Clinkscale, professional Canadian football player
- Michael Cobbins (born 1992), basketball player for Maccabi Haifa of the Israeli Basketball Premier League
- Tucker Davidson, professional baseball player
- Bobby Duncum Jr., professional wrestler
- Dory Funk, professional wrestler
- Dory Funk, Jr., professional wrestler
- Terry Funk, professional wrestler
- Heath Herring, mixed martial artist
- Mike Hettinga, aka Mike Knox, professional wrestler
- Ziggy Hood, professional football player
- Heston Kjerstad, professional baseball player
- Wildcat Monte (born Monte Deadwiley; 1905–1961), professional boxer
- Alex O'Brien, professional tennis player
- Barry Orton, professional wrestler
- Ryan Palmer, professional golfer
- Cody Pfister, mixed martial artist
- Bum Phillips, professional football coach
- Chris Romero, professional wrestler
- Mark Romero, professional wrestler
- Ricky Romero, professional wrestler
- Steven Romero, professional wrestler
- Hurles Scales, professional football player
- Mike Scroggins, professional bowler
- Brandon Slay, gold-medal Olympic wrestler
- Amarillo Slim, professional poker player
- Evan Tanner, professional mixed martial artist
- William Thomas, professional football player
- Devonte Upson (born 1993), basketball player in the Israeli Basketball Premier League
- Ken Vinyard, professional football player
- Erik Watts, professional wrestler
- Gene Wiley, professional basketball player

== Others ==
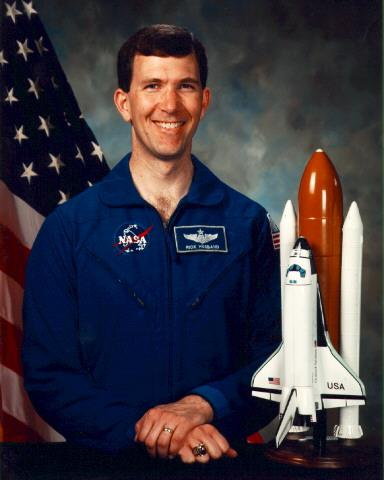
Amarillo High School graduate Rick Husband, astronaut and the Space Shuttle commander of STS-107 (Columbia) who was killed when the craft disintegrated after reentry into the Earth's atmosphere

- Charles Albright, serial killer
- George Hendricks Beverley, U.S. Air Force general
- Grady Booch, software engineer
- Thomas E. Creek, U.S. Marine Corps Medal of Honor recipient
- Brittany Holberg, convicted murderer who was sentenced to death row
- Rick Husband, astronaut
- Paul Lockhart, astronaut
- Leroy Matthiesen, local Catholic bishop
- Shanna Peeples, U.S. National Teacher of the Year, 2015
- Thomas M. Watlington, US Army major general, lived in Amarillo during retirement
