= Julia Ward (disambiguation) =

Julia Ward (1900–1962) was an American cryptographer.

Julia Ward may also refer to:

- Julia Ward Howe (1819–1910), née Ward, American poet and author, known for writing "The Battle Hymn of the Republic"
- Julia E. Ward (died 1921), American educator
- Julia Rush Cutler Ward (1796–1824), American occasional poet

== See also ==
- Julia Ward Howe School, historic school located in Philadelphia, Pennsylvania, USA
- Julie Ward (disambiguation)
