= Frank Holden =

Frank Holden may refer to:

- Frankie J. Holden, Australian singer, actor and TV presenter
- Frank Holden (footballer), Australian rules footballer
- Frank Howell Holden, American architect
