= Adrian Colbert =

American football player (born 1993)

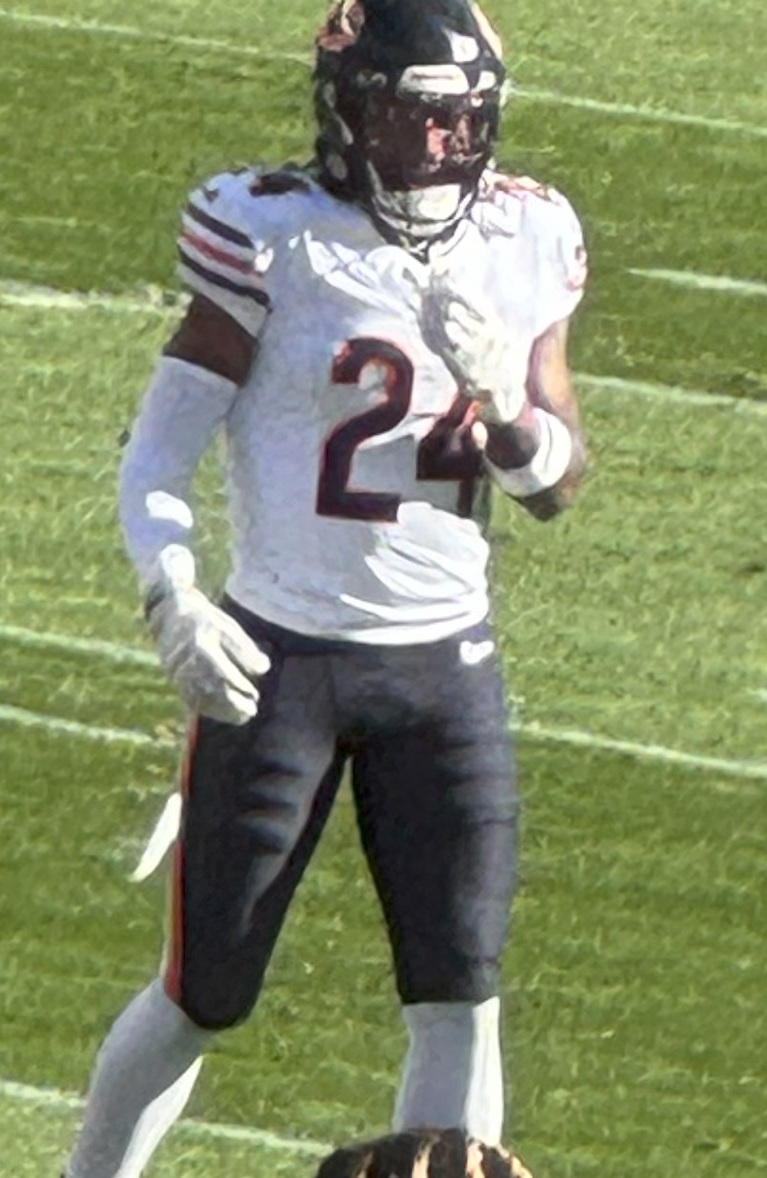
- Colbert with the Chicago Bears in 2024

Profile
- Position: Safety

Personal information
- Born: October 6, 1993 (age 33); Wichita Falls, Texas, U.S.
- Listed height: 6 ft 2 in (1.88 m)
- Listed weight: 205 lb (93 kg)

Career information
- High school: Mineral Wells (Mineral Wells, Texas)
- College: Texas (2012–2015); Miami (2016)
- NFL draft: 2017: 7th round, 229th overall pick

Career history
- San Francisco 49ers (2016–2018); Seattle Seahawks (2019); Miami Dolphins (2019); Kansas City Chiefs (2020)*; New York Giants (2020); New England Patriots (2021)*; New York Jets (2021); Cleveland Browns (2021); Tennessee Titans (2022)*; Chicago Bears (2022–2024)
- * Offseason or practice squad member only

Career NFL statistics as of 2024
- Total tackles: 111
- Forced fumbles: 2
- Fumble recoveries: 1
- Pass deflections: 8
- Stats at Pro Football Reference

Adrian Colbert (born October 6, 1993) is an American professional football safety. He played college football for the Texas Longhorns and Miami Hurricanes.

== Early life ==
Colbert attended Mineral Wells High School in Mineral Wells, Texas. He was a four-star prospect and originally committed to Texas.

== College career ==
Colbert played at the University of Texas at Austin from 2012 to 2015. He transferred to the University of Miami for his senior year in 2016.

== Professional career ==
Pre-draft measurables
Height	Weight	Arm length	Hand span	40-yard dash	10-yard split	20-yard split	20-yard shuttle	Three-cone drill	Vertical jump	Broad jump	Bench press
6 ft 0 1/2 in (1.84 m)	200 lb (91 kg)	31 3/4 in (0.81 m)	8 in (0.20 m)	4.49 s	1.52 s	2.53 s	4.31 s	7.24 s	33 in (0.84 m)	9 ft 9 in (2.97 m)	10 reps
All values from Miami's Pro Day.

=== San Francisco 49ers ===
The San Francisco 49ers selected Colbert in the seventh round (229th overall) of the 2017 NFL draft. Colbert was the 31st cornerback drafted in 2017.

On May 4, 2017, the 49ers signed Colbert to a four-year, $2.48 million contract that included a signing bonus of $84,786. He played in 14 games with six starts at free safety as a rookie, recording 37 tackles and five passes defensed.

Colbert entered the 2018 season as the starting free safety for the 49ers. He played in seven games with six starts before suffering a high ankle sprain in Week 7. He was placed on injured reserve on October 22, 2018.

Colbert was waived/injured during final roster cuts on August 31, 2019, and reverted to the team's injured reserve list the next day. He was waived from injured reserve with an injury settlement on September 6.

=== Seattle Seahawks ===
On September 18, 2019, Colbert was signed to the practice squad of the Seattle Seahawks. He was promoted to the active roster on September 26, 2019. He was waived on October 12, 2019, and re-signed to the practice squad.

=== Miami Dolphins ===
On November 19, 2019, Colbert was signed by the Miami Dolphins off the Seahawks practice squad.

Colbert re-signed with the Dolphins on March 20, 2020. He was waived on August 16, 2020.

=== Kansas City Chiefs ===
Colbert was signed by the Kansas City Chiefs on August 22, 2020. He was waived during final roster cuts on September 5, 2020.

=== New York Giants ===
On September 6, 2020, Colbert was claimed off waivers by the New York Giants. He was placed on injured reserve on November 3, 2020. On December 19, 2020, Colbert was activated off of injured reserve.

=== New England Patriots ===
On May 21, 2021, Colbert signed with the New England Patriots. On August 30, 2021, Colbert was released by the Patriots.

=== New York Jets ===
On September 6, 2021, Colbert was signed by the New York Jets to their practice squad. He was promoted to the active roster on September 20. On October 26, 2021, Colbert was released by the Jets.

=== Cleveland Browns ===
On December 19, 2021, Colbert was signed to the Cleveland Browns practice squad. He was elevated to the active roster as a COVID-19 replacement player on December 24, 2021.

=== Tennessee Titans ===
On August 9, 2022, Colbert signed with the Tennessee Titans. He was released on August 29, 2022.

=== Chicago Bears ===
On November 29, 2022, Colbert was signed to the Chicago Bears practice squad. He signed a reserve/future contract on January 9, 2023. On August 21, 2023, Colbert was placed on injured reserve. He was released with an injury settlement on August 30. He was re-signed to the practice squad on November 21, 2023. He signed a reserve/future contract on January 8, 2024.

On August 27, 2024, Colbert was released by the Bears. He was signed to the practice squad on November 20. He was promoted to the active roster on December 24 and became a free agent when the season was over.

== Personal life ==
Colbert is a cousin of NFL wide receiver Marquise Goodwin.
