= Julie Ward =

Julie Ward may refer to:

- Julie Ward (judge), Australian judge
- Julie Ward (politician) (born 1957), British politician
- Julie Ann Ward, American poet
- See Killing of Julie Ward for Julie Ward, wildlife photographer murdered in 1988
