= Pratt Field (Texas) =

Baseball stadium in Mineral Wells, Texas, US

- Interactive map of Pratt Field
- Full name: Pratt Field
- Location: 3820 Ram Blvd; Mineral Wells, Texas; 76067
- Coordinates: 32.81277°N 98.07978°W
- Owner: Mineral Wells ISD
- Operator: Mineral Wells ISD
- Capacity: 1,200
- Surface: Grass

Tenant
- Mineral Wells Steam (Texas Collegiate League) (2004-2007)

Pratt Field was the home of the Texas Collegiate League Mineral Wells Steam from 2004 to 2007 and is located in Mineral Wells, Texas. The field is located next to the Mineral Wells High School.
