= Pratt Field =

Pratt Field may refer to

- Pratt Field (Massachusetts), college football field at Amherst College, the third-oldest college football field in the United States
- Pratt Field (Texas), baseball stadium in Mineral Wells, Texas
