= Potter County Courthouse (Texas) =

- Potter County Courthouse and Library
- U.S. National Register of Historic Places
- Recorded Texas Historic Landmark
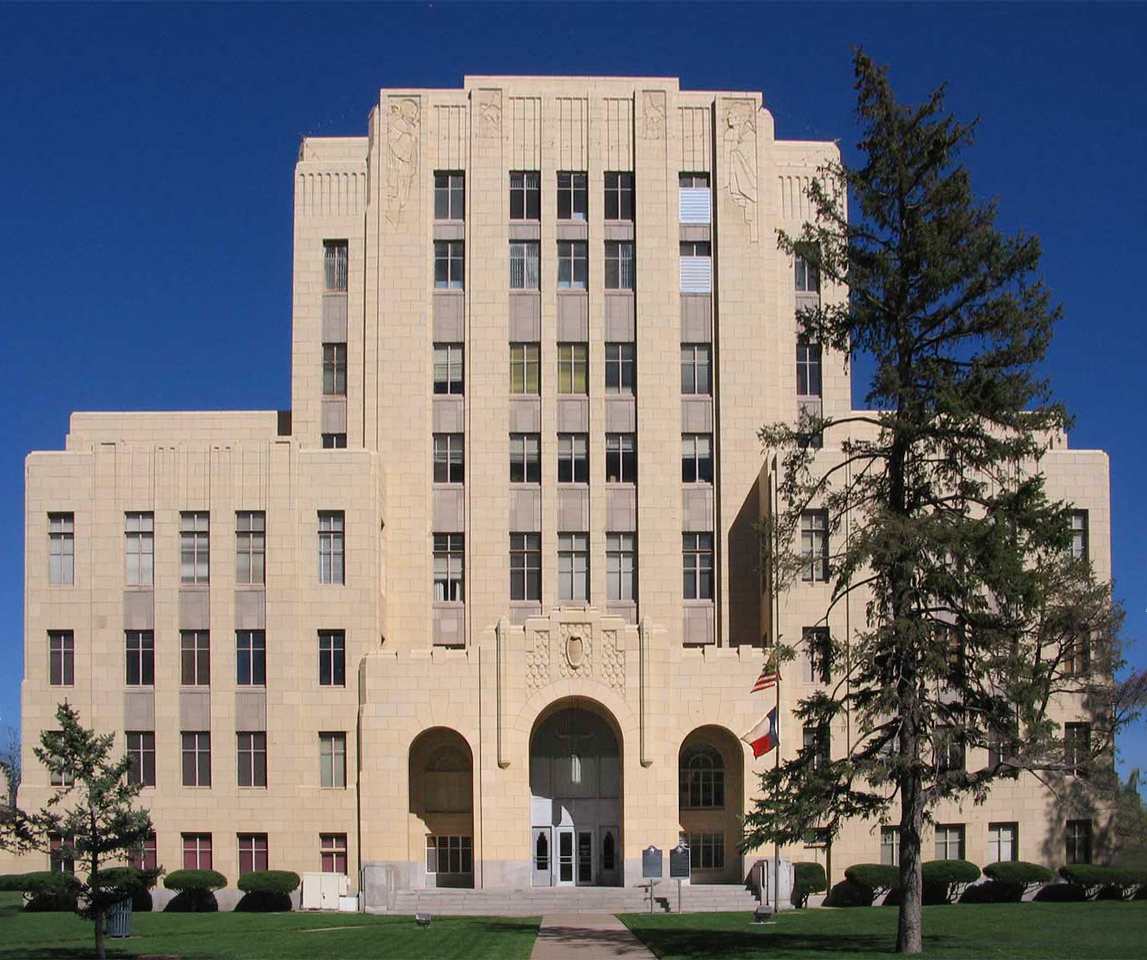
- Potter County Courthouse

- Location within Texas Location within the United States
- Location: 500 S. Fillmore, Amarillo, Texas
- Coordinates: 35°12′29″N 101°50′6″W
- Area: 2 acres (0.81 ha)
- Built: 1922
- Architect: Townes, Lightfoot & Funk; Charles Lambie, et al.
- Architectural style: Art Deco, Prairie School
- NRHP reference No.: 96000938
- RTHL No.: 40964097

Significant dates
- Added to NRHP: August 22, 1996
- Designated RTHL: 1996

The Potter County Courthouse is a government building for Potter County, located in the county seat of Amarillo, Texas. It was listed on the National Register of Historic Places on August 22, 1996.

Local architect O. G. Roquemore had designed an earlier version of the courthouse for the county.

== History ==
The art deco styled courthouse was designed by William C. Townes and was built in 1932. The courthouse cost $315,000 ($7.43 million in 2025 dollars) to build.

The Potter County Library, which sits on the same property as the courthouse, was also designed by Townes and was built in 1922.

== See also ==
- National Register of Historic Places listings in Potter County, Texas
- Recorded Texas Historic Landmarks in Potter County
