= Mineral Wells High School =

Public high school in Texas

Coordinates: 32.8171°N 98.0779°W

- Mineral Wells High School in 2026

Location
- 3801 Ram Blvd; Mineral Wells, TX 76067

Information
- Established: September 1, 1902; 124 years ago
- School district: Mineral Wells ISD
- Principal: Shanna Spillers
- Grades: 9-12
- Enrollment: 931
- Student to teacher ratio: 15:1
- Colors: Red & Black
- Mascot: Rams
- Website: mwhs.mwisd.net

Mineral Wells High School (MWHS) is a public high school in Mineral Wells, Texas. Mineral Wells High School serves students in grades 9-12 in the Mineral Wells Independent School District (MWISD). MWHS is classified as a 4A school by the UIL. In 2026 the school offered 12 AP courses. The school also offers a variety of Career and Technical Education classes and certifications to prepare students for skilled trades.

== History ==
The first high school graduating class graduated in 1905. The class of 1905 had four students, all of whom attended school in the West Ward School building, which was torn down in 1930. In 1906 the East Ward School was opened, which served as the town's first dedicated high school.

In 1914, a new building was built to house the high school. Built in a Mission Revival style, the structure was designated a Texas Historic Landmark in 2001. The high school would continue to use this building until 1953, when the new school was constructed as the town continued to grow. In 1953 the high school moved to a new structure in the south western part of town that is still in use today as the District Services Complex for MWISD.

In 1968 the school was moved to a new building in the north east part of town, on ground that had previously been used by Fort Wolters. Finally, the most recent home of the high school was built in 2000, just behind the previous school, which was demolished.

== Athletics ==
The Mineral Wells rams compete in the following sports: cross country, volleyball, football, basketball, powerlifting, golf, tennis, track and field events, softball, and baseball.

== Notable alumni ==
- Millie Hughes-Fulford (1962), molecular biologist and NASA astronaut
- Adrian Colbert (2012), NFL safety
- Dr. O. H. "Bud" Frazier (1958), heart surgeon
