= Roquemaure =

Roquemaure can refer to several places:

- Canton of Roquemaure, France
- Roquemaure, Gard, in the Gard département of France
- Roquemaure, Tarn, in the Tarn département of France
- Roquemaure, Quebec, Canada

== See also ==
- Roquemore (surname)
