= Barbara H. Bowman =

American geneticist (1930–1996)

Barabara H. Bowman
- Born: August 5, 1930; Mineral Wells, Texas, US
- Died: May 15, 1996 (aged 65); San Antonio, Texas, US
- Education: Baylor University (B.S., 1951); University of Texas at Austin (Ph.D., 1958)
- Occupation: Geneticist
- Years active: 1958–1996
- Known for: Blood plasma; Cystic fibrosis
- Notable work: Comparison of the tryptic peptides and amino acid composition of the beta polypeptide chains of the three common haptoglobin phenotypes (1967); Oyster ciliary inhibition by cystic fibrosis factor (1969); Duplication within the haptoglobin Hp 2 gene (1984)

Barbara Hyde Bowman (August 5, 1930 – May 15, 1996) was an American biologist, geneticist, and educator who was known for her research in human blood proteins. Her work characterized variants of globins, the family of proteins responsible for transporting blood in oxygen, and in 1984, Oliver Smithies and she showed that variations in haptoglobins were due to polymorphisms in the HP gene.

== Life ==
Barbara Hyde Bowman was born in 1930 in Mineral Wells, Texas, the youngest of three. At an early age, her parents gave her a chemistry set, which along with encouragement from her teachers and librarian, fostered her interest in science. She attended Baylor University as an undergraduate and received a bachelor of science degree in biology in 1951. Afterward, she pursued graduate studies in microbiology, zoology, and genetics at the University of Texas at Austin, where she earned her doctorate in 1958.

Over her lifetime, she co-founded the Texas Genetics Society and was president of the American Society of Human Genetics. She took a special interest in supporting other women in science, advocating for equal pay and access to childcare. She died in 1996 of breast cancer in San Antonio. In her honor, the Texas Genetics Society renamed their Distinguished Texas Geneticist Award to the Barbara Bowman Distinguished Texas Geneticist Award "to recognize outstanding geneticists who have made major contributions to the field and have been affiliated with a Texas institution." The Bowman-Frost Endowment for Oncology Research was established posthumously, named after her brother Harvey Frost and her.

== Research ==
After completing her doctorate, Bowman began studying variants of globins with Vernon Ingram at the Massachusetts Institute of Technology. She worked on haptoglobins (hemoglobin-binding proteins) and compared the peptides and amino acid composition of three common phenotypes.

Bowman became a professor and chair of the Department of Human Genetics at the University of Texas Medical Branch in Galveston in 1967, where she began studying cystic fibrosis (CF). While there, she discovered that exposing oyster gills to the serum of patients with CF caused the cilia to stop functioning. She co-founded the Texas Genetics Society in 1974, and in 1981, she became chair of the Department of Cellular and Structural Biology at the University of Texas Health Science Center in San Antonio. She was also the president of the American Society of Human Genetics that year. A few years later, Oliver Smithies and she followed up on her earlier research on globins, and they discovered the different alleles of the HP gene that change how haptoglobins bind to free hemoglobin She received the Distinguished Texas Geneticist Award in 1990, and after her death, it was renamed in her honor. Her last publication, in 1996, was a study of transgenic mouse models of apolipoprotein E (APOE) proteins and Alzheimer's disease.
