= Mineral Wells Independent School District =

School district in Texas

Mineral Wells Independant School District
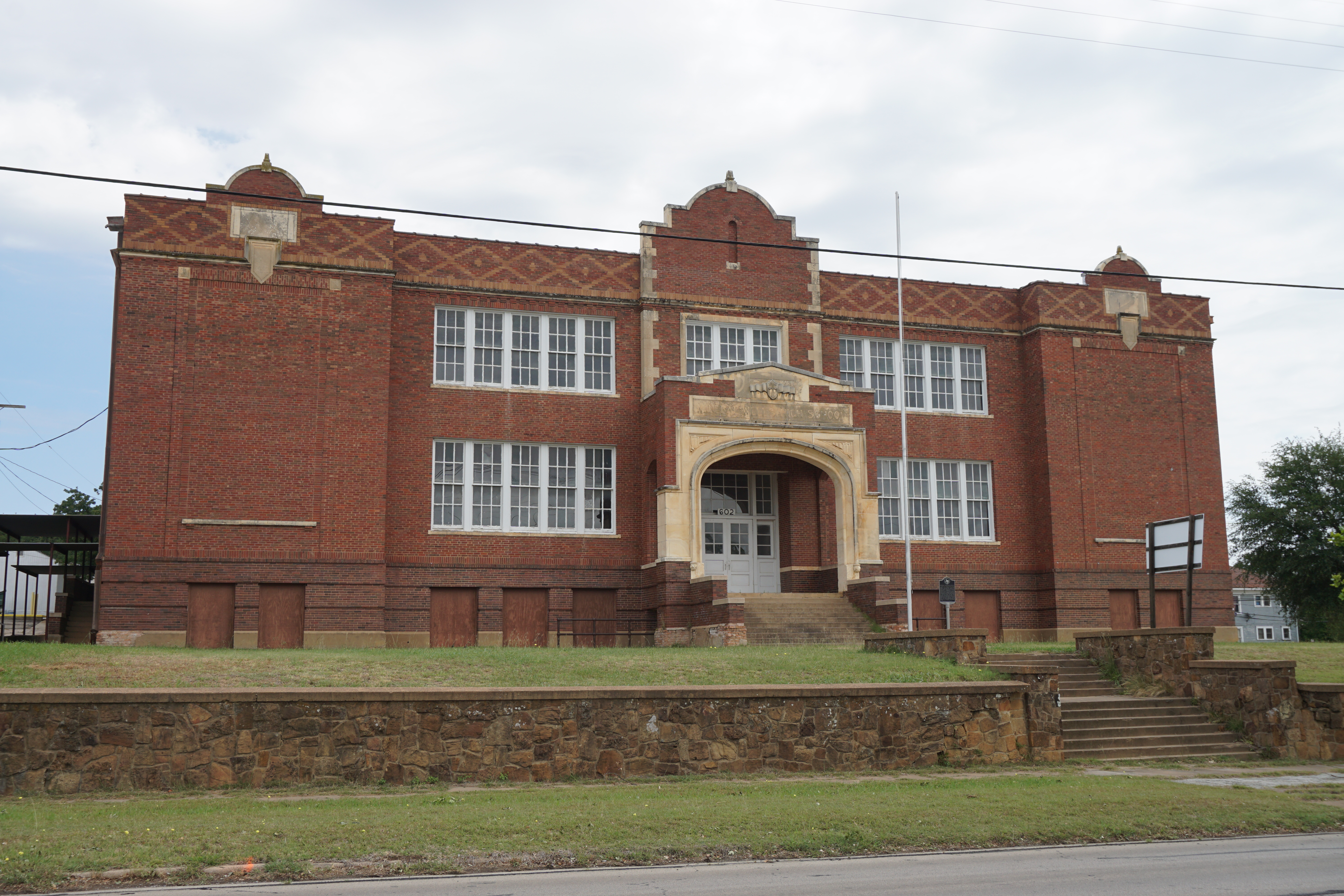
- Old Mineral Wells High School
- 906 Southwest 5th Avenue Mineral Wells, Palo Pinto, Texas, 76067

District information
- Type: Independent
- Motto: Every student. Every day. Whatever it takes.
- Grades: Pre-K–12
- Established: August 12, 1921; 105 years ago
- Superintendent: David Tarver
- Schools: 6
- Budget: $46.7 M (FY2026)
- NCES District ID: 4830950

Students and staff
- Students: 3,303
- Student–teacher ratio: 15:1
- Athletic conference: 4A
- District mascot: Ram

Other information
- Website: www.mwisd.net

Mineral Wells Independent School District is a public independent school district (ISD) based in Mineral Wells, Texas, United States. Mineral Wells ISD is a TEA "recognized" school district; it operates the schools indicated in the table below.

MWISD Schools
School	Grades served
Lamar Elementary	PK - 1
Houston Elementary	2 - 3
Travis Elementary	4 - 6
Mineral Wells Junior High	7 - 8
Mineral Wells High School	9 - 12
Mineral Wells Academy	9 - 12

Mineral Wells High School has these sports facilities:

- Ram Stadium (football)
- Pratt Field (baseball)
- Kessler Field (softball)
- Jackie Harvey Track Complex (athletics)
- Eight tennis courts
- Basketball arena

Located in Palo Pinto County, a very small part of the district extends into Parker County.

The district changed to a four-day school week in fall 2022.

In 2026, schools in the Mineral Wells ISD had TEA accountability ratings of "B" in Student Achievement and School Progress and "A" in Closing the Gaps, with an overall rating of "B". Additionally, the schools received a TEA distinction for Academic Achievement in science, mathematics, and social studies.
