= Harold Britt =

Australian cricketer

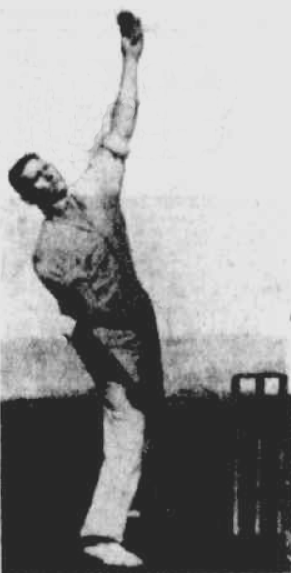

Personal information
- Born: 6 May 1911; Melbourne, Australia
- Died: 20 September 1988 (aged 77); Melbourne, Australia

Domestic team information
- Years: Team
- 1935-1936: Victoria
- Source: Cricinfo, 22 November 2015

Harold Britt (6 May 1911 – 20 September 1988) was an Australian cricketer. He played three first-class cricket matches for Victoria between 1935 and 1936.

Britt's father, Les was well-known district cricketer. As a junior Britt played both football and cricket, and in 1926 he achieved recognition when he took 7 for 26 for Doncaster Heights Cricket Club at the age of fifteen. He gave up football in 1933 before debuting for Collingwood Cricket Club in 1934. He was described as a hostile opening swing bowler and also a capable bat and talented point or slips fielder. In late 1935 he was mentioned as a potential state player for Victoria described as a dangerous venomous bowler, and in December he was named in the Victorian XI.

== See also ==
- List of Victoria first-class cricketers
