= Louis Power =

Australian cricketer

Personal information
- Born: 10 October 1905; Adelaide, Australia
- Died: 30 September 1988 (aged 82)
- Source: Cricinfo, 21 September 2020

Louis Power (10 October 1905 – 30 September 1988) was an Australian cricketer. He played in two first-class matches for South Australia in 1926/27.

== See also ==
- List of South Australian representative cricketers
