= Svend Møllnitz =

Danish footballer (1897–1988)

Personal information
- Date of birth: 7 July 1897
- Date of death: 18 September 1988 (aged 91)

International career
Years	Team	Apps	(Gls)
1927	Denmark	1	(0)

Svend Møllnitz (7 July 1897 – 18 September 1988) was a Danish footballer. He played in one match for the Denmark national football team in 1927.
