= Russ Elliott =

Australian rules footballer

Personal information
- Full name: Joseph Russell Elliott
- Born: 12 July 1918; Burnley, Victoria
- Died: 10 September 1988 (aged 70); Hastings, Victoria
- Original team: South Hawthorn
- Height: 185 cm (6 ft 1 in)
- Weight: 87 kg (192 lb)

Playing career^{1}
Years	Club	Games (Goals)
1939, 1941–42	Hawthorn	9 (4)
- ^{1} Playing statistics correct to the end of 1942.

Joseph Russell Elliott (12 July 1918 – 10 September 1988) was an Australian rules footballer who played with Hawthorn in the Victorian Football League (VFL).

Elliott was recruited after an outstanding season at South Hawthorn United, he had kicked 174 goals in the 1936 season. His large haul included 25 kicked against Box Hill Methodists. He holds the record for the most goals in an Eastern Suburban Protestant Churches Association season.

Elliott's VFL career ended when he enlisted to serve in the Australian Army during World War II.
