= John D. Roquemore =

Confederate veteran and Alabama state senator (1846–1900)

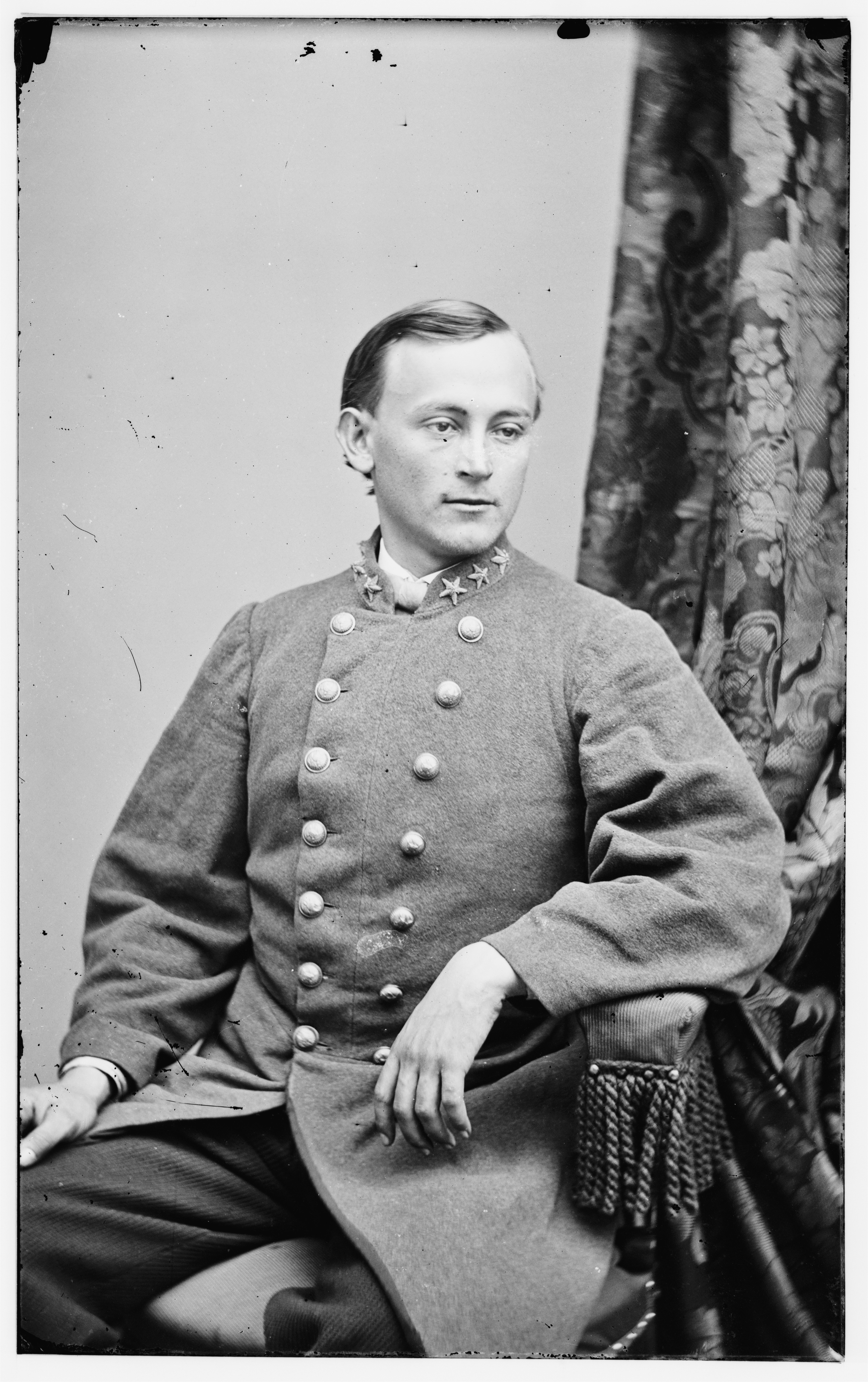

Member of the Alabama Senate from the 28th district
- In office 1878–1882

Personal details
- Born: August 27, 1846 Barbour County, Alabama, US
- Died: March 12, 1900 (aged 53) Montgomery, Alabama, US
- Party: Democratic

Military service
- Allegiance: Confederate States
- Branch/service: Confederate States Army
- Rank: Colonel
- Battles/wars: American Civil War

John D. Roquemore (August 27, 1846 – March 12, 1900), a Confederate veteran of the American Civil War, was an American lawyer and state senator from Alabama.

== Life ==
John D. Roquemore was born in Barbour County, Alabama, on August 27, 1846, and was a son of Zachariah and Julia A. (née McGibony) Roquemore, natives of Georgia. The senior Roquemore was born in 1809, and his wife in 1818. They came to Alabama in 1836, locating first in Russell County, and later on in Barbour. Roquemore was a self-made man. He was a planter by occupation, and carried that business on most extensively for some years prior to his death; he died in 1868.

John D. Roquemore was reared on his father's plantation, and received his primary education at the common schools. In 1864 he left the State University, where he had but recently matriculated, and joined "Nelson's Rangers". His company was assigned to General Stephen D. Lee's escort, and with it Roquemore participated in many conflicts of arms.

Returning from the army after the final cessation of hostilities, Roquemore began the study of law at Eufaula, and in May 1867 was admitted to the bar. He began the practice at once at Eufaula, and readily rose to prominent rank in the profession. The Montgomery and Florida Railway Company, of which he was a director, made him their general counselor, and he was for some years one of the trusted attorneys of the Central Railroad and Banking Company of Georgia.

In 1876 he was appointed one of the commissioners to codify the Alabama statutes, and from 1878 to 1882 he represented his district in the State Senate. In 1880 he was Adjutant-General of the State, and in the same year the Alabama University conferred upon him the honorary degree of A.M.

He came to Decatur in September 1887, for the purpose of continuing the law practice, the style of his firm being Roquemore, White & Long, with offices also at Montgomery and Eufaula. There he soon became identified with various popular enterprises, and was in 1888 President of the Decatur Water-works Company, vice-president of the Decatur Street Railway Company, President of the Exchange Bank, and one of the directors of the Decatur Land, Improvement and Furnace Company.

In addition to the duties incumbent upon him by reason of his connection with these various industries, Roquemore continued the practice of law, and the firm of which he was the head was recognized throughout the State as being among the very best.

He died at his home in Montgomery on March 12, 1900, at 8 a.m., after an illness of a few months.

== Personal life ==
At Eufaula, in 1867, John D. Roquemore was married to Miss Mary L. Hunter, of that place, and to this marriage five children were born. She was the daughter of James L. Hunter, and a niece of Mrs. General H. D. Clayton, Mrs. J. L. Pugh and Mrs. B. J. Hoole, and a cousin to A. H. Merrill, Esq. Her mother was a sister of John Gill, Eli S. and Henry R. Shorter.

Mary L. Roquemore died on June 13, 1882, leaving five children: Charles H., Annie D., Mary L., John D. and "Zach." John Roquemore's second wife, to whom he was married on October 25, 1887, was the accomplished daughter of Captain David Brown, of Massachusetts. She was noted for her many rare and admirable qualities and her superior educational attainments.

Mr. Roquemore was a Knight Templar Mason and a Knight of Pythias.

== Sources ==
- "Death Loves a Shining Mark". The Montgomery Advertiser. March 13, 1900. p. 10, col. 2.
- Northern Alabama: Historical and Biographical. (Part IV. Monographs of the Principal Cities and Towns in Northern and Central Alabama, Together With Biographical Sketches of Many of Their Representative People). Birmingham, AL: Smith & De Land, 1888. pp. 325–326, 611.
