= John Robinson (cricketer, born 1909) =

English cricketer

Personal information
- Full name: John Foster Robinson
- Born: 2 February 1909; Bristol, England
- Died: 28 September 1988 (aged 79); Bristol, England
- Batting: Right-handed
- Role: Bowler

Domestic team information
- Years: Team
- 1929: Gloucestershire

Career statistics
Competition	FC
Matches	1
Runs scored	0
Batting average
100s/50s
Top score
Balls bowled
Wickets
Bowling average
5 wickets in innings
10 wickets in match
Best bowling
Catches/stumpings
- Source: Cricinfo, 4 August 2013

John Robinson (2 February 1909 – 28 September 1988) was an English cricketer. He played one match for Gloucestershire in 1929.
