= Jasmine Taylor =

American entrepreneur (born 1991/92)

- Born: 1991 or 1992 (age 34–35)
- Website: baddiesandbudgets.com

Jasmine Taylor is an American entrepreneur and personal finances influencer who shares her budgeting strategies, including cash stuffing, and sells branded budgeting supplies online.

== Early life and education ==
Taylor was born and raised in Amarillo, Texas, and describes herself as "growing up poor". She has an undergraduate degree in applied science.

== Cash stuffing ==
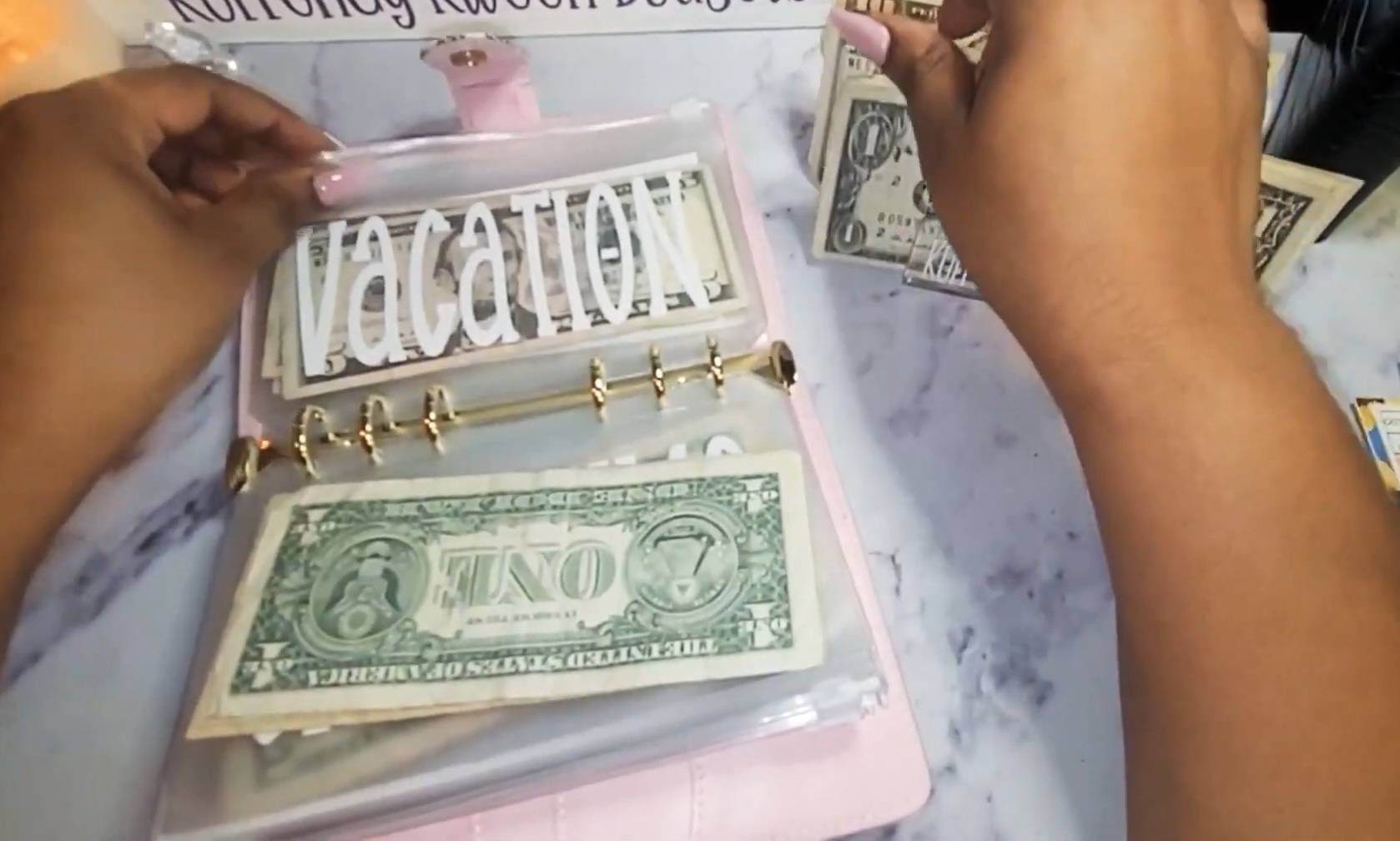
Cash stuffing

In early 2021, Taylor's personal finances were "a mess", according to New York Times business and economics columnist Peter Coy, to whom Taylor said in an interview "I told myself, this is my last year of living like this". She had $80,000 in debt, had lost her full-time job and was depending on side jobs such as driving for DoorDash. She investigated budgeting strategies and discovered cash stuffing, a zero-based, cash-only strategy which involves dividing physical currency into envelopes for various categories of spending; when a given variable-spending envelope, such as groceries, is empty, no more money can be spent on that category.

Taylor began using the method in February 2021. She said the cash-only strategy "clicked a switch in my head"; she told an interviewer, "I could hand you a $100 bill now and a debit card with $100. I guarantee you it would be a lot easier to swipe that card than it would be to break the $100. We just have some type of connection with physical cash."

== Business ==
Taylor blogs and posts videos showing herself counting cash into envelopes to TikTok, Instagram, Facebook and YouTube.

When Taylor started using the cash stuffing strategy, she also began posting to TikTok about it, primarily "to keep myself accountable", with no specific plan to create a business. She had previously started several small businesses which did not succeed but which had taught her various lessons about running a business, and when the videos went viral, she realized she had found a market. She expanded her postings to other social media sites and in 2021 used a $1200 COVID-19 stimulus check to start a website, Baddies and Budgets; purchase supplies to create branded cash-stuffing supplies; and set up a Shopify account to sell them online. She started the business out of her bedroom in April 2021, moving eventually into a storage unit and finally a small office and warehouse.

According to Taylor, speaking to CNBC in 2023, the business has "been profitable every month since we started". By the end of 2021 the business had brought in $250,000, and she was able to pay off $30,000 of her debt. In 2022 her annual revenues were $850,000 and she paid off the rest of her debt. By early 2023 she had hired three contract workers.

== Personal life ==
Taylor lives in Amarillo, Texas.
