= Julie Ann Ward =

American poet

- Born: Antlers, Oklahoma
- Education: University of California, Berkeley
- Website: julieannward.com

Julie Ann Ward (born in Antlers, Oklahoma) is an American poet best known for being the first poet laureate of Norman, Oklahoma. Norman was the first city in Oklahoma to appoint a poet laureate. She was born in Antlers, Oklahoma, and grew up in Elko, Nevada and Stillwater, Oklahoma. She is a graduate of University of Tulsa, University of Kansas and University of California, Berkeley. She taught at the University of Oklahoma as an Associate Professor of Spanish and Latin American literature from 2014 to 2022.

== Works ==
=== Books ===
- Antología abierta de literatura hispana Rebus Community Press 2017.
- A Shared Truth: The Theater of Lagartijas Tiradas al Sol University of Pittsburgh Press, 2019. ISBN 9780822965886

=== Articles ===
- "Entrevista con Lagartijas Tiradas al Sol" Latin American Theatre Review 45:2, pp. 139–146, 2012.
- "Elena Poniatowska:«Dear Diego/Querido Diego, te abraza Quiela». Trans. Nathanial Gardner. Oxford: Oxbow Books, 2012." Lucero 22:1, 2012.
- "Self, Esteemed: Contemporary Auto/biographical Theatre in Latin America" University of California, Berkeley. 2013.
- "Documentary dramaturgy in Brazil" Routledge Handbooks Online 2014.
- "Staging Postmemory: Self-representation and Parental Biographying in Lagartijas Tiradas al Sol's El rumor del incendio" Latin American Theatre Review 47:2 pp. 25–44, 2014.
- "Affective suffrage: Social media, street protests, and theatre as alternative spaces for political self-representation in the 2012 Mexican presidential elections" Transmodernity: Journal of Peripheral Cultural Production of the LusoLuso-Hispanic World 7:2, 2017.
- "Translator's Note: Crossing Borders" World Literature Today 91:1, p. 7, 2017.
- Elizabeth Mays, Robin DeRosa, Rajiv Jhangiani, Timothy Robbins, David Squires, Julie Ward, Anna Andrzejewski, Samara Burns, Matthew Moore, "A guide to making open textbooks with students" Rebus Community, 2017
- "Making Reality Sensible: The Mexican Documentary Theatre Tradition, 1968-2013" Theatre Journal 69:2 pp. 197–211, Johns Hopkins University Press, 2017.
- "Beside motherhood: Staging women’s lives in Latin American Theatre of the Real" The Routledge Companion To Gender, Sex And Latin American Culture, pp. 377–385 2018.
- "Escuela de conducción y la posibilidad del fracaso." Biodrama/Proyecto Archivos: Seis piezas documentales de Vivi Tellas. pp. 196–199
- "Julie Ward: More than 6,000 Oklahoma Dreamers in danger." Tulsa World, 2018.
- "Poetic Justice: An Interview with Ellen Stackable." Oklahoma Humanities
- "The Unfinished Art of Theater: Avant-Garde Intellectuals in Mexico and Brazil. By Sarah J. Townsend. Performance Works. Evanston, IL: Northwestern University Press, 2018;" Theatre Survey 60:3, pp. 477–479, 2019.
- "The Other Southern Border: Mexico's Forgotten Frontier in Nadia Villafuerte's Barcos en Houston (2005)" Revista de estudios hispánicos 53:1, pp. 59–75, 2019.
- "Mouthful of Birds by Samanta Schweblin" World Literature Today, 2019.
- "Opening up Hispanic Literature: An Open-Access Critical Edition Assignment." InSight: A Journal of Scholarly Teaching 15, pp. 122–141, 2020.
- "Midsommar’s Nordic Nationalism and Neo-Confederate Nostalgia." Film Quarterly 2020.
- "Humiliation by Paulina Flores.” World Literature Today 2020.
- "Caminar en zapatos migrantes: la lógica fronteriza de la instalación de realidad virtual Carne y arena de Alejandro González Iñárritu" Investigación Teatral. Revista de artes escénicas y performatividad 12:20, pp. 50–68, 2021.
- "Federico Falco A Perfect Cemetery by Jennifer Croft" World Literature Today 95:2, p. 96, 2021.

=== Translations ===
- "Cosmo Girl.” 91:1, pp. 20–23. World Literature Today, 2017.
- "Turn Around?" Latin American Literature Today, 2017.
