= Kenichi Furuya =

Japanese ice hockey player

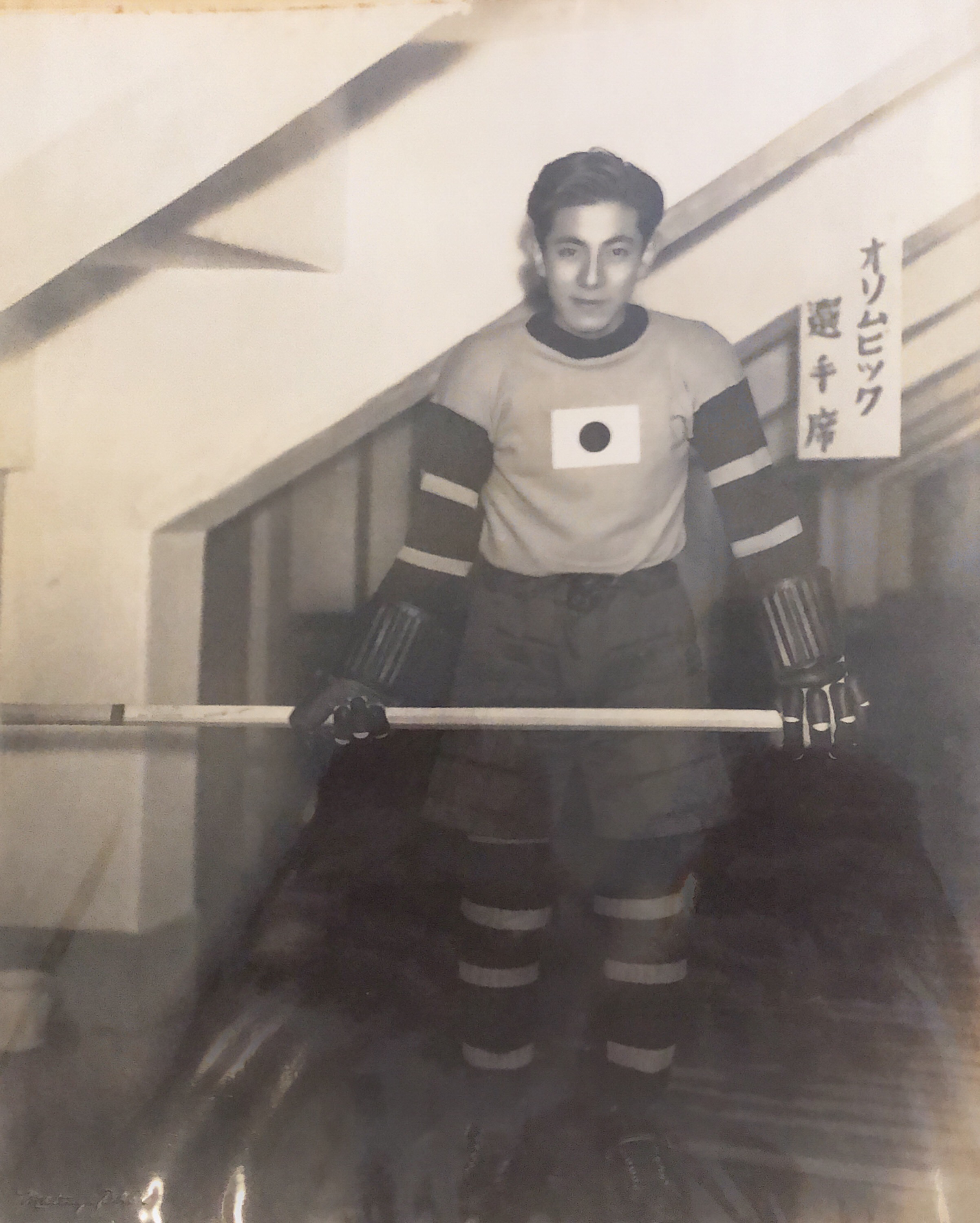
- Furuya at 1936 Japan Winter Olympics

Personal information
- Nationality: Japanese
- Born: 8 November 1912 Tokyo, Japan
- Died: 1 September 1988 (aged 75) Tokyo, Japan

Sport
- Sport: Ice hockey

Kenichi Furuya (古屋 健一, Furuya Ken'ichi; 8 November 1912 – 1 September 1988) was a Japanese ice hockey player. He competed in the men's tournament at the 1936 Winter Olympics.
