= George Peters (footballer) =

Australian rules footballer, born 1912

Personal information
- Full name: George Alfred Peters
- Born: 16 June 1912; Bright, Victoria
- Died: 21 September 1988 (aged 76); Prahran, Victoria
- Height: 183 cm (6 ft 0 in)
- Weight: 85 kg (187 lb)

Playing career^{1}
Years	Club	Games (Goals)
1931	North Melbourne	6 (3)
- ^{1} Playing statistics correct to the end of 1931.

George Alfred Peters (16 June 1912 – 21 September 1988) was an Australian rules footballer who played with North Melbourne in the Victorian Football League (VFL).

Peters later served in the Australian Army during World War II.
