= Larry Roquemore =

American dancer, actor, and choreographer (1938–2016)

- Born: Larry Lee Roquemore; March 29, 1938; Mineral Wells, Texas, U.S.
- Died: October 25, 2016 (aged 78); Fredericksburg, Texas, U.S.
- Known for: Dance, acting, choreography
- Movement: Musical theatre, Ballet
- Spouse: Bettye Jenkins (m. 1961)
- Children: 1

Larry “Rocky” Roquemore (March 29, 1938 – October 25, 2016) was an American dancer, actor, singer, and choreographer. He is best known for portraying Rocco in the original Broadway production and the 1961 film adaptation of West Side Story. Later in his career, he founded the Corpus Christi Ballet, the first ballet company in Corpus Christi, Texas.

== Early life and education ==
Roquemore was born in Mineral Wells, Texas, in 1938. His parents, Dalnar Franklin Roquemore and Marie Van Hoosier Roquemore, operated a grocery store in Mineral Wells during his early childhood.

During World War II, both parents worked at an aircraft factory in Fort Worth, Texas. By 1950, Marie was operating a café while Dalnar continued factory work.

The family were members of Arlington Heights Methodist Church, and Roquemore was raised in a Methodist household. In 1948, his parents moved to Fort Worth, where they owned and operated the Stardust Café downtown until Dalnar’s death in 1967.

After her husband’s death, Marie Roquemore pursued a long career in retail sales, first at The Fair department store and later for more than 30 years at Neiman Marcus, where she received the Golden Stallion Award for sales excellence. She later remarried Ernest Oxley and gained a stepson, Tom Oxley.

== Career ==
=== Broadway and film ===
Roquemore began his Broadway career in 1957 as a dancer in Li’l Abner. Later that year, he auditioned for West Side Story when a replacement role became available. He was selected to play Rocco, a member of the Sharks gang, after competing against numerous professional dancers in New York.

His performance in the stage production led to his casting in the 1961 film adaptation. Director and choreographer Jerome Robbins contacted Roquemore during auditions for the film, and he was selected from among more than 500 performers who screen-tested at Metro-Goldwyn-Mayer Studios in Hollywood.

Roquemore also appeared in further Broadway productions: Destry Rides Again (1959), Tovarich (1963), Anyone Can Whistle (1964), Kelly (1965) and Hallelujah, Baby! (1967)

=== Television ===
In addition to his stage and film work, Roquemore appeared on several television programs, including The Ed Sullivan Show, The Bell Telephone Hour, and The Garry Moore Show. He also danced with Eva Gabor in a segment of The Tonight Show.

=== Dance teaching ===
After managing a Fred Astaire Dance Studio in Englewood, New Jersey, Roquemore and his wife returned to Texas in 1972, settling in Corpus Christi, Jenkins’s hometown. They became affiliated with the Ella Ilse Studio of Dance, teaching and performing in Corpus Christi and Kingsville.

After returning to Texas in 1972, Roquemore and his wife became active in dance instruction and performance in the Corpus Christi area. In January 1974, they founded Corpus Christi Ballet, the city’s first ballet company, and Roquemore served as its director, helping to establish formal ballet training in the region.

Roquemore retired from full-time dance work in 1989 and moved to the Texas Hill Country. During retirement, he continued teaching country western, ballroom, swing, and line dancing.

== Personal life ==
Roquemore married Bettye Jenkins in 1961. The couple had one daughter, Laurie Lea Roquemore Austin, born in 1966, and one grandson.

== Death ==
Roquemore died on October 25, 2016, at the age of 78, following a battle with cancer. A memorial service was held on November 12, 2016, at St. Barnabas Episcopal Church in Fredericksburg, Texas.
