= Killing of Julie Ward =

1988 death in Masai Mara, Kenya

Julie Ward
- Ward in 1988
- Born: 20 April 1960; Suffolk, England
- Died: 6 September 1988 (aged 28); Masai Mara, Kenya
- Known for: Victim of unsolved murder
- Parent: John Ward

Julie Ward was a British woman who was killed while on safari in the Masai Mara game reserve in Kenya in September 1988. The subsequent investigation into her death was notable for the campaign by her father, John Ward — first, to persuade the Kenyan authorities to recognise that his daughter was murdered, and second, to try to identify the killer or killers. Three people were charged with her murder, although none has been convicted.

== Death ==
Julie Ward was a publishing assistant and amateur wildlife photographer from Bury St Edmunds in England. At the beginning of September 1988, she had been in Africa for seven months photographing wildlife and was due to return to England in about a week. She was travelling to the Masai Mara game reserve with an Australian friend, Dr. Glen Burns. On 5 September 1988 the vehicle they were driving broke down; Dr. Burns returned to Nairobi while Ward spent the night alone at the Mara Serena lodge. On 6 September, the vehicle was repaired and Ward left to drive to the nearby Sand River camp to recover some camping equipment. This was the last time she was seen alive.

Ward was reported missing, and her father, John Ward, flew to Kenya to find his daughter. He hired a plane to search the areas of the game reserve where his daughter was known to have camped alone. A pilot sighted the vehicle in a gully next to a river and Mr. Ward went to investigate in person. Julie Ward's burned and dismembered body was found by John Ward in the ashes of a fire on 13 September.

== Investigation ==
The original theory put forth by the Kenyan officials was that Ward had been eaten by lions and struck by lightning; however, they later accepted that she was murdered after her father's efforts uncovered further evidence. The Kenyan coroner's report had been altered to disguise the fact that her bones had been cut by a sharp blade rather than gnawed by animals. A British pathologist found that Ward had been dismembered with a machete then doused in petrol and set alight.

John Ward, a retired hotelier, spent nearly £2 million on the investigation and made more than 100 visits to Kenya. He has accused the Kenyan government and former President Daniel arap Moi of trying to cover up his daughter's murder to prevent damage to the tourist industry. A former MI6 agent has admitted having a role in the case but denied participating in a cover-up.

== Subsequent events ==
In 1992, after the first of two trials, two junior park rangers were acquitted of her murder owing to a lack of evidence. The presiding judge in the trial recommended the investigation of the head park ranger. In 1997, the case was reexamined by a fresh team of Kenyan police. In July 1998, Simon Ole Makallah, the chief park warden at the time of the murder, was arrested following a two-year investigation. On 16 September 1999, Makallah was found not guilty at the second trial owing to lack of evidence. In 2004, a British inquest, held at Ipswich, recorded a verdict of unlawful killing.

In October 2009, the case was reopened after a secret visit to Kenya by John Yates, the head of the Metropolitan Police's anti-terrorism squad. In December 2009, Valentine Ohuru Kodipo, a key witness of the murder, died. Kodipo died in Denmark where he had lived in exile for more than 20 years. Ward's murder was so sensitive that Kodipo had fled Kenya following his testimony.

John Ward believed that Jonathan Moi, a son of Kenyan President Daniel arap Moi, was responsible for the rape and murder of his daughter. In 2018, Ward campaigned in the media for the authorities in Kenya to obtain a DNA sample from the person he suspected of the crime. In June 2023, Ward died aged 89.

== See also ==
- List of unsolved murders (1980–1999)
