= George Hendricks Beverley =

United States Air Force general (1897–1988)

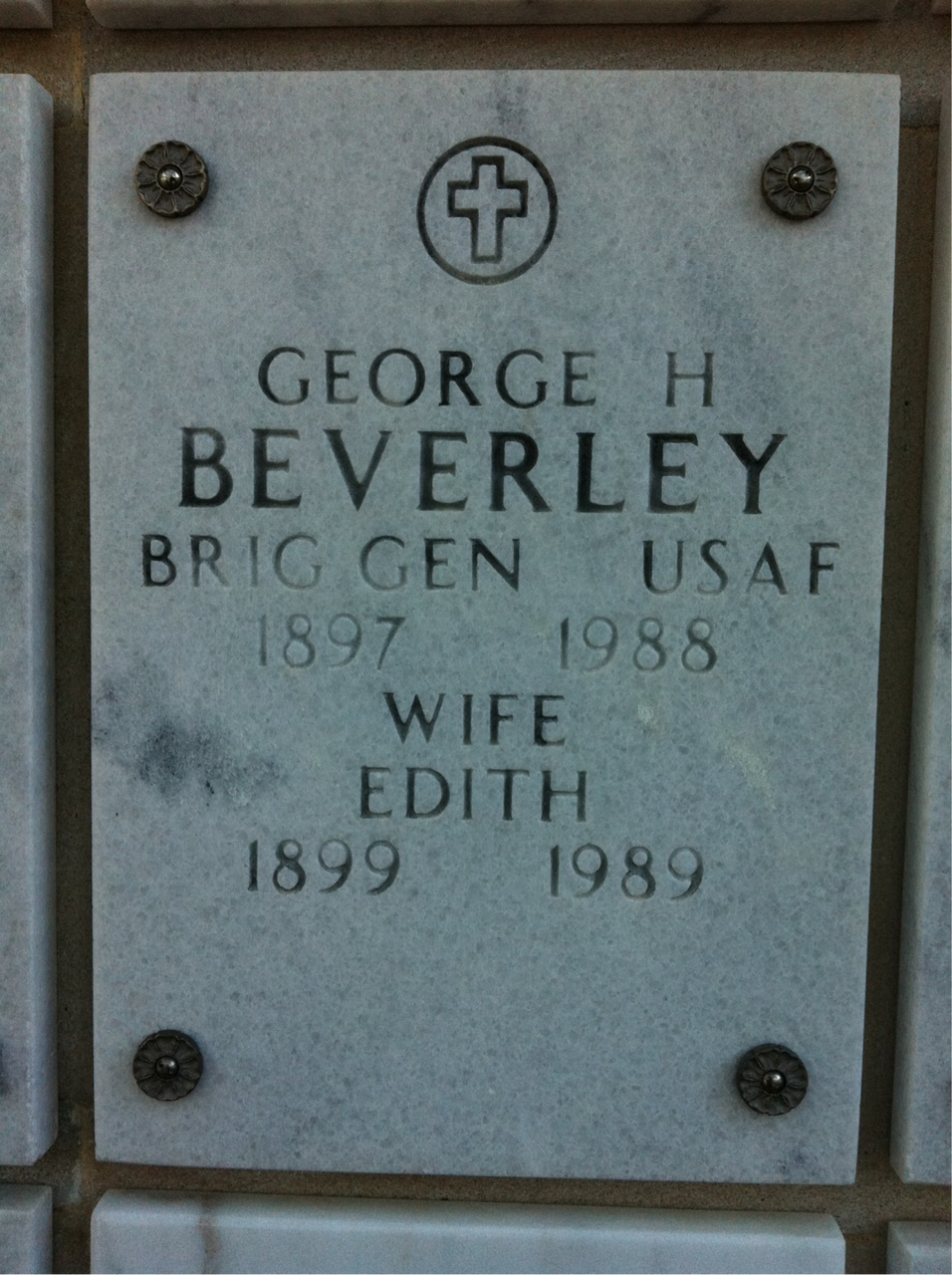
- Grave at Arlington National Cemetery
- Born: May 27, 1897; Amarillo, Texas
- Died: September 15, 1988 (aged 91)
- Burial place: Arlington National Cemetery
- Military career
- Allegiance: United States of America
- Branch: United States Air Force
- Rank: Brigadier general

George Hendricks Beverley (May 27, 1897 – September 15, 1988) was a brigadier general in the United States Air Force.

== Biography ==
Beverley was born on May 27, 1897, in Amarillo, Texas. He attended Texas A&M College and the University of Texas at Austin. Beverley died on September 15, 1988, and is interred with his wife, Edith, at Arlington National Cemetery.

== Career ==
Beverley first joined the United States Army Air Service and was commissioned an officer in 1918 before serving in World War I. Following the war he participated in a controversial experimental bombing of U.S. Navy vessels ordered by Brigadier General Billy Mitchell. The bombings helped support Mitchell's stance of how effective aerial bombing could be on naval vessels. In 1935 he was given command of the 29th Pursuit Squadron. During World War II he held command of the 51st Troop Carrier Wing. Following the war he transferred to the newly formed Air Force and served as a military attaché and military air attaché in Rio de Janeiro, Brazil. His retirement was effective as of August 1, 1949.

Awards he received include the Legion of Merit with oak leaf cluster.
