= O. G. Roquemore =

American architect (1856–1925)

O.G. Roquemore
- Born: Otho Gibson Roquemore; December 2, 1856; Tobotow, Georgia, U.S.
- Died: October 25, 1925 (aged 68); Dallas, Texas, U.S.
- Burial place: Grove Hill Memorial Park, Dallas, Texas, U.S.
- Occupation: Architect
- Spouse: Josephine "Josie" Peterman (m. 1892)
- Children: 3

Otho Gibson "O. G." Roquemore Sr. (December 2, 1856 – October 25, 1925) was an American architect, active in Texas.

== Life and career ==
Otho Gibson Roquemore was born on December 2, 1856, in Tobotow, Georgia. His father Thomas C. Roquemore was a planter who owned slaves and died after serving in the Confederate States Army and being wounded in the Battle of Arkansas Post in 1863. His mother Mary Ann Edwards had died one year prior. Otho and his younger siblings moved to Panola County, Texas, where they were raised on a farm by their grandfather. He was a direct descendant of Pierre Roquemore, a French Huguenot settler in the United States.

Roquemore worked in Gainesville, Texas starting in 1886, before moving to Amarillo, Texas in 1900. He designed several churches as well as the Old Potter County Courthouse.

He married Josephine "Josie" Peterman from St. Joseph, Missouri, and they had three children. He lived at 907 Tyler Street in Amarillo, Texas, in a home he had designed, and his office was in the Eakle building (now known as Oliver–Eakle–Barfield Building). He was an elder in the Presbyterian Church.

Roquemore died on October 25, 1925, in a sanatorium in Dallas, Texas, from complications after a fractured hip. He is buried at Grove Hill Memorial Park in Dallas, Texas.

== Works ==
- Chickasaw National Bank (c. 1892) in Purcell, Indian Territory (now Purcell, Oklahoma)
- Old Potter County Courthouse (c. 1896) in Amarillo, Texas
- L. T. Lester House (1901) in Canyon, Texas; NRHP-listed
- Hartley County Courthouse (1906) at 900 Main Street, Channing, Texas
- Hartley County Jail (1906) in Channing, Texas
- Jons–Gilvin House (1907) at 1500 South Buchanan Street, Amarillo, Texas; NRHP-listed
- Amarillo National Bank (1907 addition), Amarillo, Texas
- Oldham County Courthouse (1915) in Tascosa, Texas; a ghost town just north of Vega, Texas, now the Julian Bivins Museum
- Old Central Presbyterian Church in Amarillo, Texas
