= Frank Holden (footballer) =

Australian rules footballer, born 1913

Personal information
- Full name: Francis Foster Holden
- Born: 29 March 1913
- Died: 26 September 1988 (aged 75)
- Height: 184 cm (6 ft 0 in)
- Weight: 86 kg (190 lb)

Playing career^{1}
Years	Club	Games (Goals)
1935–36	Geelong	5 (4)
- ^{1} Playing statistics correct to the end of 1936.

Francis Foster Holden (29 March 1913 – 26 September 1988) was an Australian rules footballer who played with Geelong in the Victorian Football League (VFL).
