= Mineral Wells, Texas =

- City
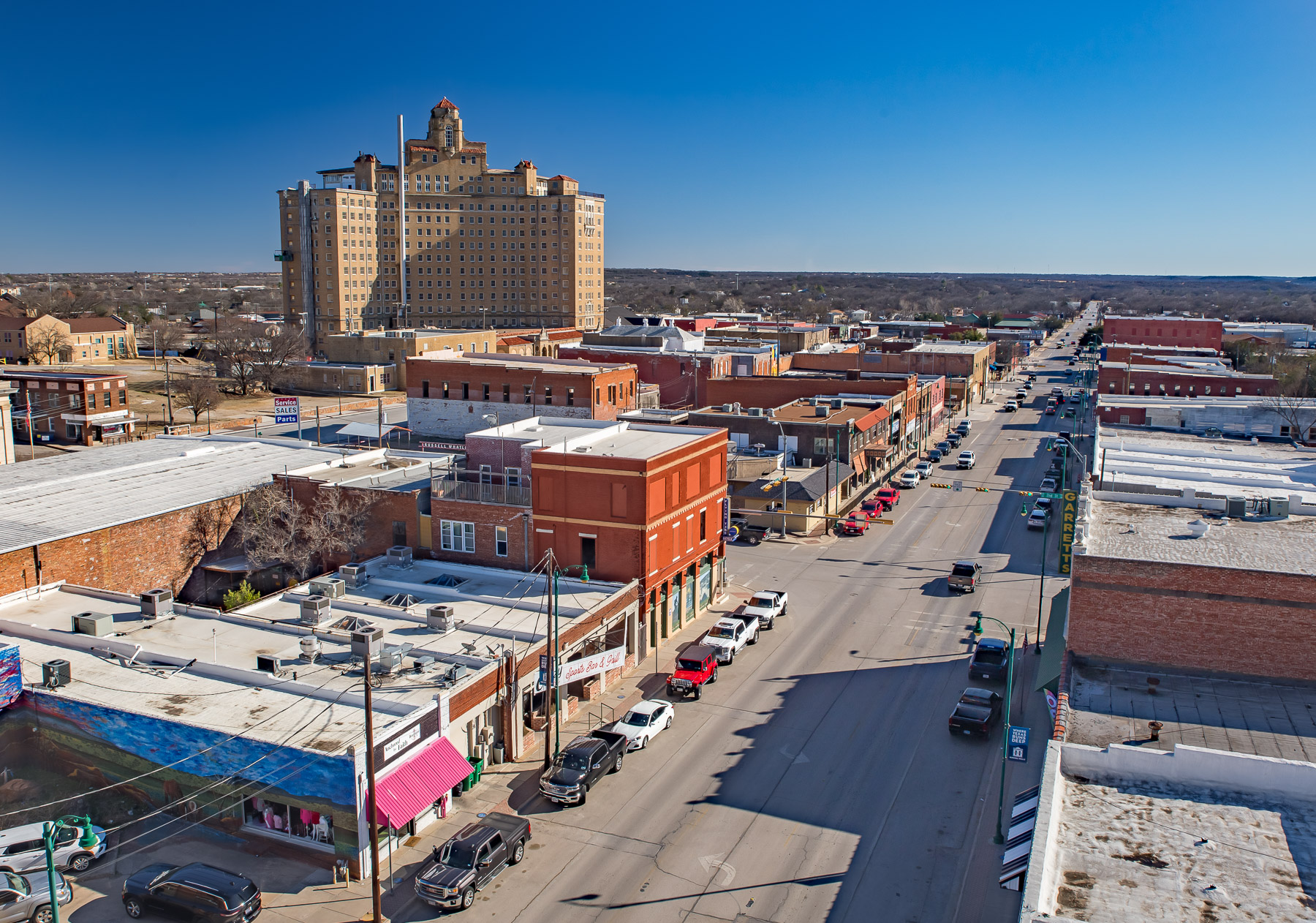
- Downtown Mineral Wells (2022)

- Location within Palo Pinto County
- Coordinates: 32°48′33″N 98°6′46″W
- Country: United States
- State: Texas
- Counties: Palo Pinto, Parker

Government
  - Type: Council-Manager

Area
  - Total: 21.15 sq mi (54.79 km^{2})
  - Land: 20.40 sq mi (52.83 km^{2})
  - Water: 0.76 sq mi (1.96 km^{2})
- Elevation: 902 ft (275 m)

Population (2020)
  - Total: 14,820
  - Density: 726.5/sq mi (280.5/km^{2})
- Time zone: UTC−06:00 (Central (CST))
  - Summer (DST): UTC−05:00 (CDT)
- ZIP Codes: 76067-76068
- Area code: 940
- FIPS code: 48-48684
- Website: MineralWellsTX.gov

Mineral Wells is a city in Palo Pinto and Parker Counties in the U.S. state of Texas. Its population was 14,820 at the 2020 census. The city is named for mineral springs in the area, which were highly popular in the early 1900s.

== History ==
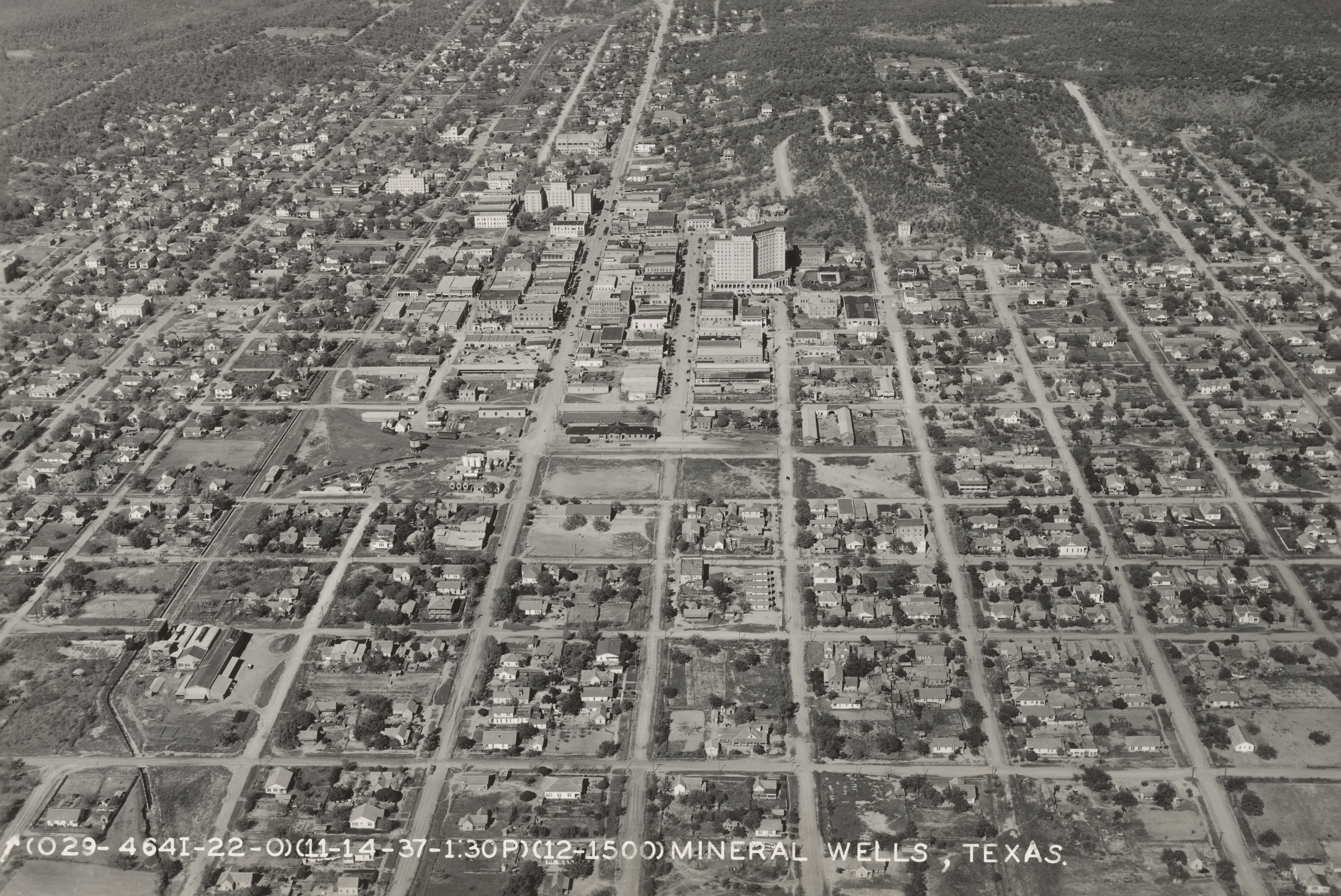
Mineral Wells in 1937

In 1919, Mineral Wells hosted the spring training camp for the Chicago White Sox, the year of the famous "Black Sox" scandal involving "Shoeless" Joe Jackson. Mineral Wells also hosted spring training for the Cincinnati Reds and St. Louis Cardinals in the 1910s and early 1920s. The baseball field was located in the center of town. On April 28, 2026, the city was struck by an EF-3 tornado, injuring five people and causing $2.3 million in damage.

=== Military ===
Mineral Wells' military history dates back to 1864 with the organization of Company 1, 4th Texas Infantry. By January 1925, the War Department approved the site that would become Camp Wolters, the training ground for the 56th Cavalry Brigade of the Texas National Guard.

In 1956, the base began operations as the Primary Helicopter Center of the United States Army that would provide basic training and primary flight training for all rotary-wing aviators. The Vietnam War created an increased need for pilots. To meet the demand, Fort Wolters increased operations to become the training site for helicopter pilots for the Marine Corp in 1968 and the Air Force in 1970. Nearly every helicopter pilot who flew in Vietnam was trained at Fort Wolters. Fort Wolters was deactivated in 1973.

== State park ==
Mineral Wells is very well known for the state park, which features fishing, camping, horseback riding, biking, hiking trails, and rock climbing. One attraction is Penitentiary Hollow, a popular rock-climbing area.

== Geography ==
Mineral Wells lies east of the Brazos River and Palo Pinto Mountains.

According to the United States Census Bureau, the city has a total area of 21.2 square miles (54.9 km^{2}), of which 0.7 sq mi (1.9 km^{2}) (3.45%) is covered by water.

Mineral Wells is 51 miles (82 km) west of Fort Worth and 109 miles (175 km) east of Abilene.

=== Climate ===
The climate in this area is characterized by relatively high temperatures and evenly distributed precipitation throughout the year. The Köppen climate classification describes the weather as humid subtropical, and uses the code Cfa.

Climate data for Mineral Wells Airport, Texas (1991–2020 normals, extremes 1948–present)
| Month | Jan | Feb | Mar | Apr | May | Jun | Jul | Aug | Sep | Oct | Nov | Dec | Year |
|---|---|---|---|---|---|---|---|---|---|---|---|---|---|
| Record high °F (°C) | 91 (33) | 97 (36) | 98 (37) | 102 (39) | 106 (41) | 114 (46) | 112 (44) | 113 (45) | 111 (44) | 104 (40) | 94 (34) | 91 (33) | 114 (46) |
| Mean maximum °F (°C) | 79.5 (26.4) | 83.7 (28.7) | 89.6 (32.0) | 92.5 (33.6) | 96.3 (35.7) | 99.9 (37.7) | 103.9 (39.9) | 104.6 (40.3) | 99.6 (37.6) | 93.8 (34.3) | 84.5 (29.2) | 79.7 (26.5) | 106.2 (41.2) |
| Mean daily maximum °F (°C) | 58.0 (14.4) | 62.2 (16.8) | 70.5 (21.4) | 77.8 (25.4) | 84.5 (29.2) | 91.7 (33.2) | 96.1 (35.6) | 96.0 (35.6) | 88.5 (31.4) | 78.7 (25.9) | 67.3 (19.6) | 58.7 (14.8) | 77.5 (25.3) |
| Daily mean °F (°C) | 45.4 (7.4) | 49.7 (9.8) | 57.7 (14.3) | 64.9 (18.3) | 72.8 (22.7) | 79.9 (26.6) | 83.8 (28.8) | 83.5 (28.6) | 76.4 (24.7) | 66.0 (18.9) | 55.0 (12.8) | 46.5 (8.1) | 65.1 (18.4) |
| Mean daily minimum °F (°C) | 32.8 (0.4) | 37.2 (2.9) | 45.0 (7.2) | 52.0 (11.1) | 61.0 (16.1) | 68.2 (20.1) | 71.4 (21.9) | 71.0 (21.7) | 64.3 (17.9) | 53.3 (11.8) | 42.7 (5.9) | 34.3 (1.3) | 52.8 (11.6) |
| Mean minimum °F (°C) | 17.6 (−8.0) | 21.5 (−5.8) | 25.9 (−3.4) | 34.7 (1.5) | 45.6 (7.6) | 59.8 (15.4) | 65.9 (18.8) | 63.9 (17.7) | 50.5 (10.3) | 36.3 (2.4) | 25.4 (−3.7) | 19.6 (−6.9) | 14.3 (−9.8) |
| Record low °F (°C) | 4 (−16) | −4 (−20) | 10 (−12) | 27 (−3) | 32 (0) | 51 (11) | 58 (14) | 56 (13) | 40 (4) | 23 (−5) | 12 (−11) | −8 (−22) | −8 (−22) |
| Average precipitation inches (mm) | 1.59 (40) | 2.19 (56) | 2.98 (76) | 2.63 (67) | 4.00 (102) | 3.55 (90) | 2.13 (54) | 2.49 (63) | 2.66 (68) | 3.28 (83) | 2.41 (61) | 1.89 (48) | 31.80 (808) |
| Average precipitation days (≥ 0.01 in) | 5.8 | 6.2 | 7.3 | 6.9 | 8.9 | 6.9 | 5.0 | 5.8 | 5.8 | 6.5 | 5.9 | 5.9 | 76.9 |
Source: NOAA

== Demographics ==
Historical population
| Census | Pop. | Note | %± |
|---|---|---|---|
| 1890 | 577 | | — |
| 1900 | 2,048 | | 254.9% |
| 1910 | 3,950 | | 92.9% |
| 1920 | 7,890 | | 99.7% |
| 1930 | 5,986 | | −24.1% |
| 1940 | 6,303 | | 5.3% |
| 1950 | 7,801 | | 23.8% |
| 1960 | 11,053 | | 41.7% |
| 1970 | 18,411 | | 66.6% |
| 1980 | 14,468 | | −21.4% |
| 1990 | 14,870 | | 2.8% |
| 2000 | 16,946 | | 14.0% |
| 2010 | 16,788 | | −0.9% |
| 2020 | 14,820 | | −11.7% |
| 2024 (est.) | 15,688 | | 5.9% |
U.S. Decennial Census

=== Racial and ethnic composition ===
Mineral Wells city, Texas – Racial and ethnic composition Note: the US Census treats Hispanic/Latino as an ethnic category. This table excludes Latinos from the racial categories and assigns them to a separate category. Hispanics/Latinos may be of any race.
| Race / Ethnicity (NH = Non-Hispanic) | Pop 2000 | Pop 2010 | Pop 2020 | % 2000 | % 2010 | % 2020 |
|---|---|---|---|---|---|---|
| White alone (NH) | 11,835 | 10,712 | 9,457 | 69.84% | 63.81% | 63.81% |
| Black or African American alone (NH) | 1,478 | 1,292 | 516 | 8.72% | 7.70% | 3.48% |
| Native American or Alaska Native alone (NH) | 77 | 64 | 69 | 0.45% | 0.38% | 0.47% |
| Asian alone (NH) | 106 | 89 | 155 | 0.63% | 0.53% | 1.05% |
| Native Hawaiian or Pacific Islander alone (NH) | 1 | 3 | 10 | 0.01% | 0.02% | 0.07% |
| Other race alone (NH) | 13 | 16 | 40 | 0.08% | 0.10% | 0.27% |
| Mixed race or Multiracial (NH) | 171 | 189 | 506 | 1.01% | 1.13% | 3.41% |
| Hispanic or Latino (any race) | 3,265 | 4,423 | 4,067 | 19.27% | 26.35% | 27.44% |
| Total | 16,946 | 16,788 | 14,820 | 100.00% | 100.00% | 100.00% |

=== 2020 census ===
As of the 2020 census, Mineral Wells had a population of 14,820 people living in 5,653 households, including 3,329 families; the median age was 36.9 years, 25.7% of residents were under 18, and 16.8% were 65 or older. For every 100 females, there were 92.9 males, and for every 100 females 18 and over, there were 88.6 males age 18 and over.

About 94.1% of the residents lived in urban areas, while 5.9% lived in rural areas.

Of the 5,653 households in Mineral Wells, 34.3% had children under 18 living in them; 41.3% were married-couple households, 18.3% were households with a male householder and no spouse or partner present, and 31.5% were households with a female householder and no spouse or partner present. About 28.3% of all households were made up of individuals, and 13.9% had someone living alone who was 65 or older.

The city had 6,252 housing units, of which 9.6% were vacant. The homeowner vacancy rate was 1.7% and the rental vacancy rate was 7.3%.

Racial composition as of the 2020 census
| Race | Number | Percent |
|---|---|---|
| White | 10,825 | 73.0% |
| Black or African American | 538 | 3.6% |
| American Indian and Alaska Native | 163 | 1.1% |
| Asian | 157 | 1.1% |
| Native Hawaiian and other Pacific Islander | 11 | 0.1% |
| Some other race | 1,516 | 10.2% |
| Two or more races | 1,610 | 10.9% |

== Government ==
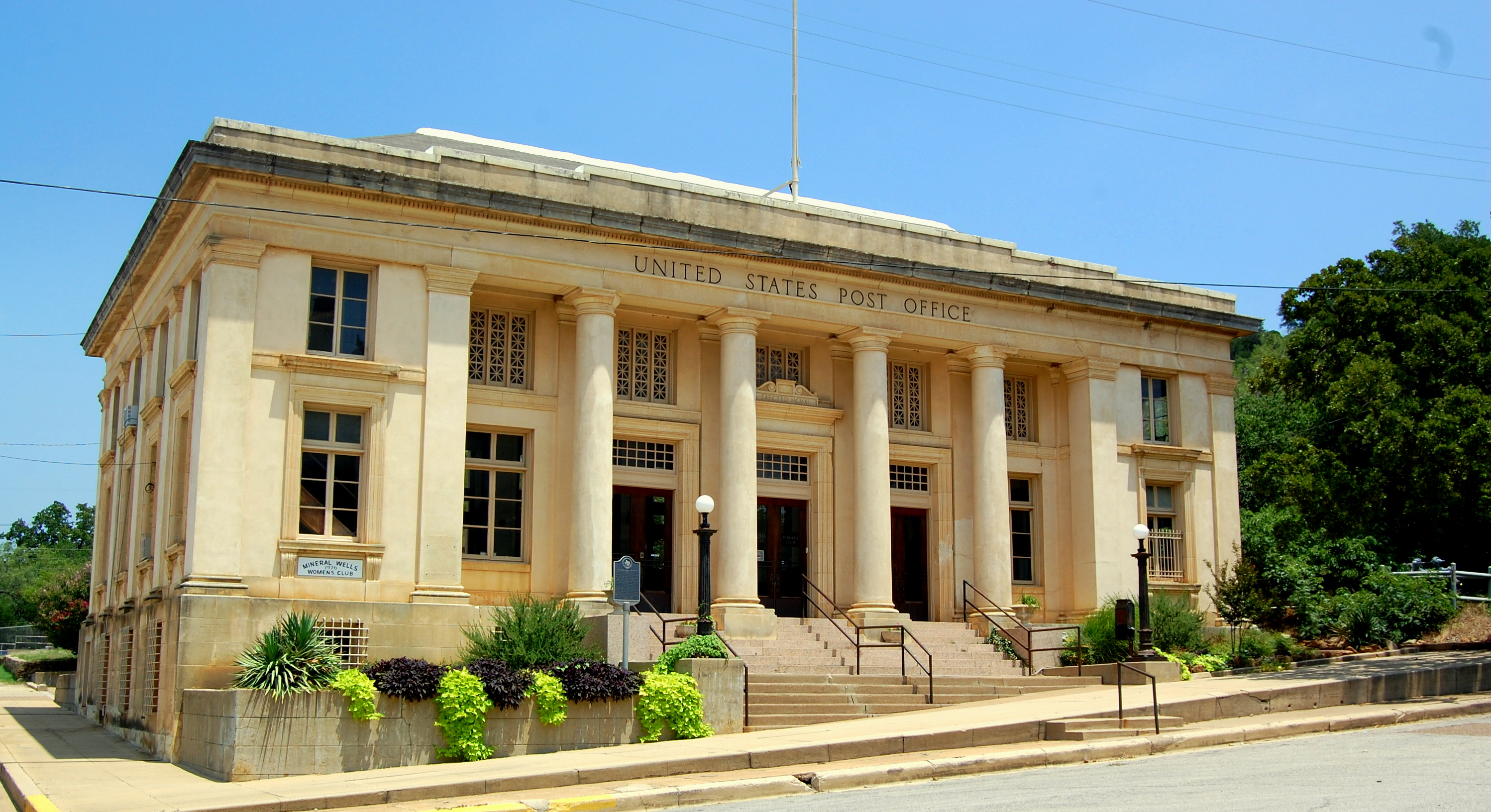
Historic post office in Mineral Wells

The Texas Department of Criminal Justice (TDCJ) operates the Mineral Wells District Parole Office in Mineral Wells. The Corrections Corporation of America (CCA) operated the Mineral Wells Pre-Parole Transfer Facility in the Fort Wolters Industrial Park on behalf of the TDCJ. It closed in August 2013. The correctional facility, which had been operated by CCA since 1995, is located on the property of the former Fort Wolters in Palo Pinto County and in Mineral Wells. It can house up to 2,100 prisoners. As of March 2013, its annual payroll was $11.7 million, and it was among the largest employers in Mineral Wells, with about 300 employees. On Monday March 4, 2013, the Texas Senate Finance Committee voted 11–4 to close the correctional facility. Mike Allen, the mayor of Mineral Wells, criticized the closure, saying, "We'll lose right at over 300 jobs, and 300 jobs in a community of 17,000 ... is devastating. This means a lot to this community." John Whitmire, the head of the Texas Senate Criminal Justice Committee, said, "We're sitting on about 12,000 empty [prison] beds, so it just makes good business sense ... that we not operate it, and we take those savings and plow them back into additional public-safety programs."

The United States Postal Service operates the Mineral Wells Post Office. Its ZIP codes are 76067 and 76068.

== Education ==
Mineral Wells is served by the Mineral Wells Independent School District and the Community Christian School.

Weatherford College operates a branch campus on the old Fort Wolters facility.

== Notable people ==
- Barbara H. Bowman, geneticist
- Bill Camfield, TV children's entertainer
- Paul Carson, actor
- Adrian Colbert, NFL football player for the Miami Dolphins
- Alvin Garrett, NFL football player and Super Bowl champion
- Dan Herbeck, journalist for The Buffalo News, co-author of American Terrorist
- Millie Hughes-Fulford, American medical investigator, molecular biologist and former NASA astronaut
- Curt Knight, NFL kicker for the Washington Redskins
- Shane McAnally, singer-songwriter and record producer
- Kevin Rahm, actor
- Larry Roquemore, dancer, actor, singer, and choreographer, noted for his part in the 1961 film adaption of West Side Story
- Amanda Shires, singer-songwriter
- Alvy Ray Smith (born September 8, 1943), noted pioneer in computer graphics
- James Vick, UFC lightweight

== Gallery ==
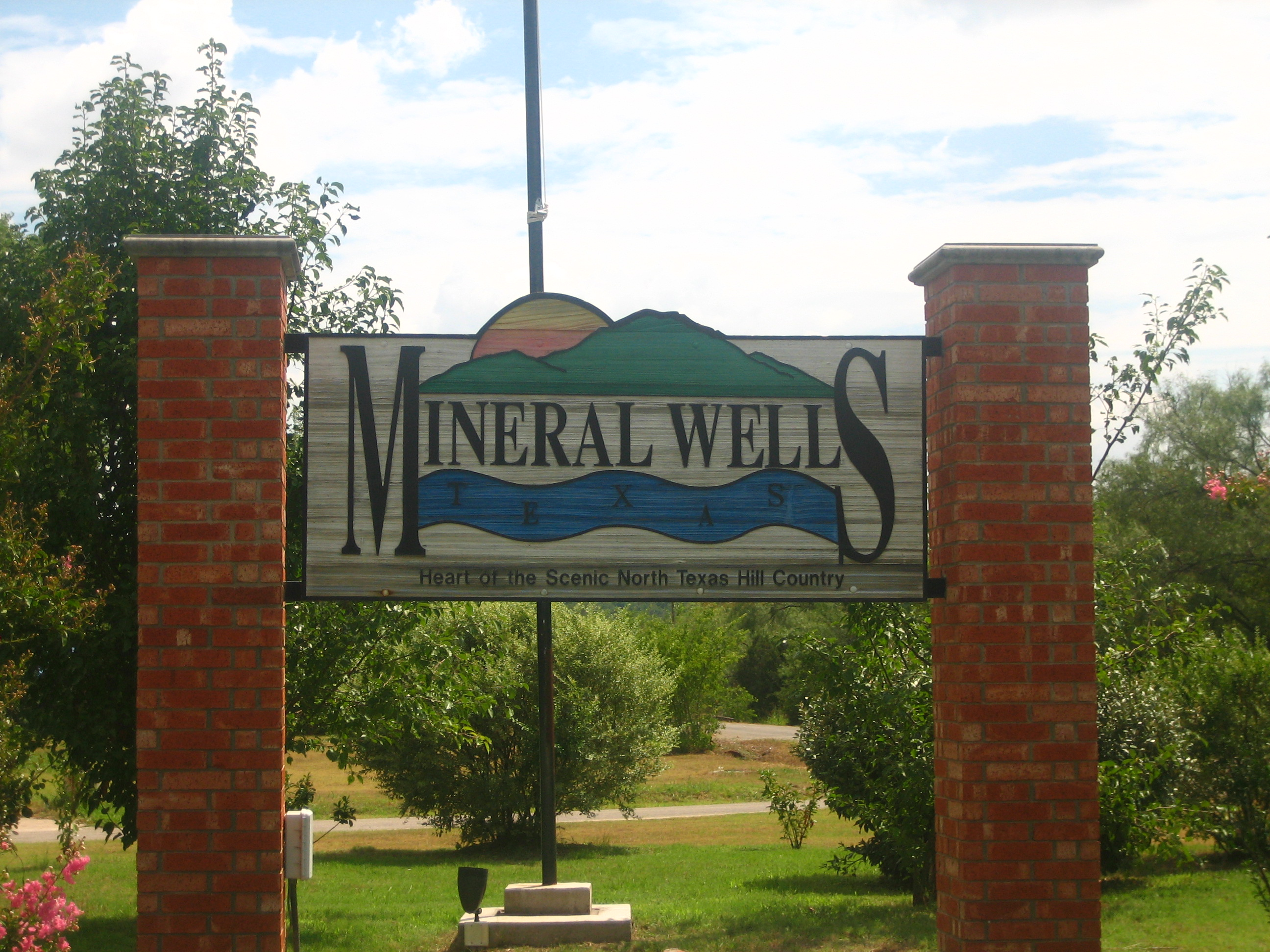
Entrance sign

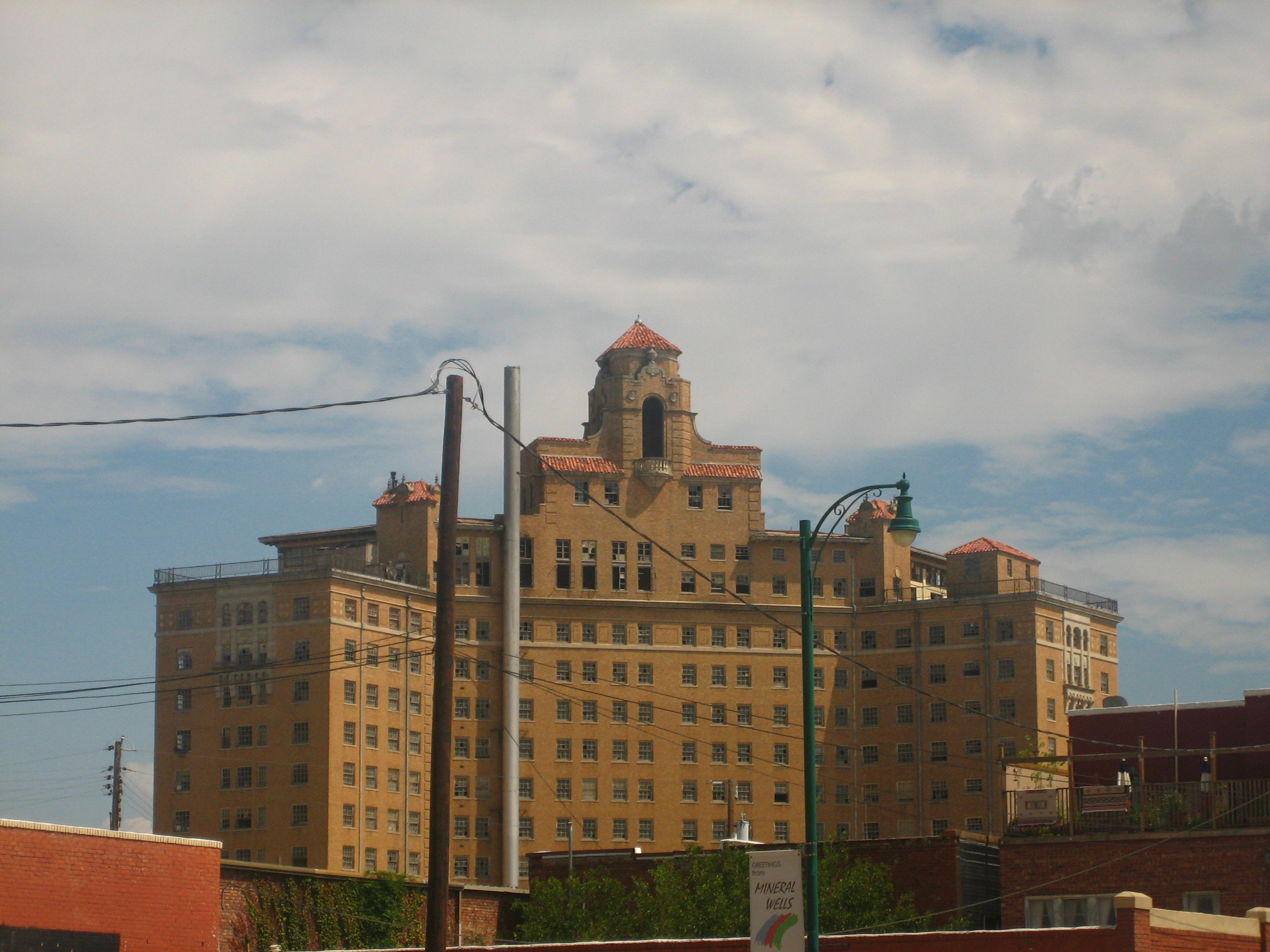
Baker Hotel

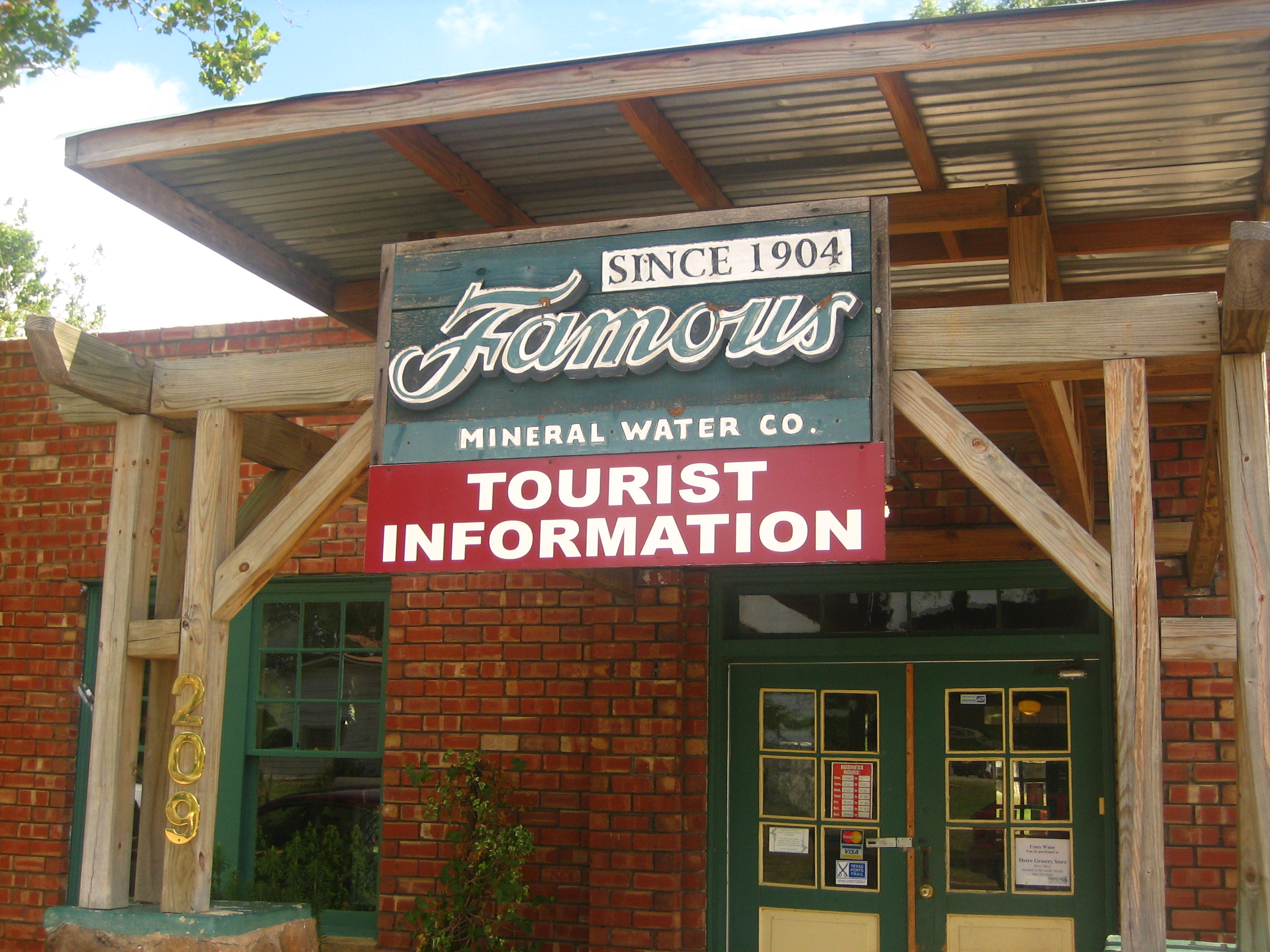
Site of historic Famous Mineral Water Company

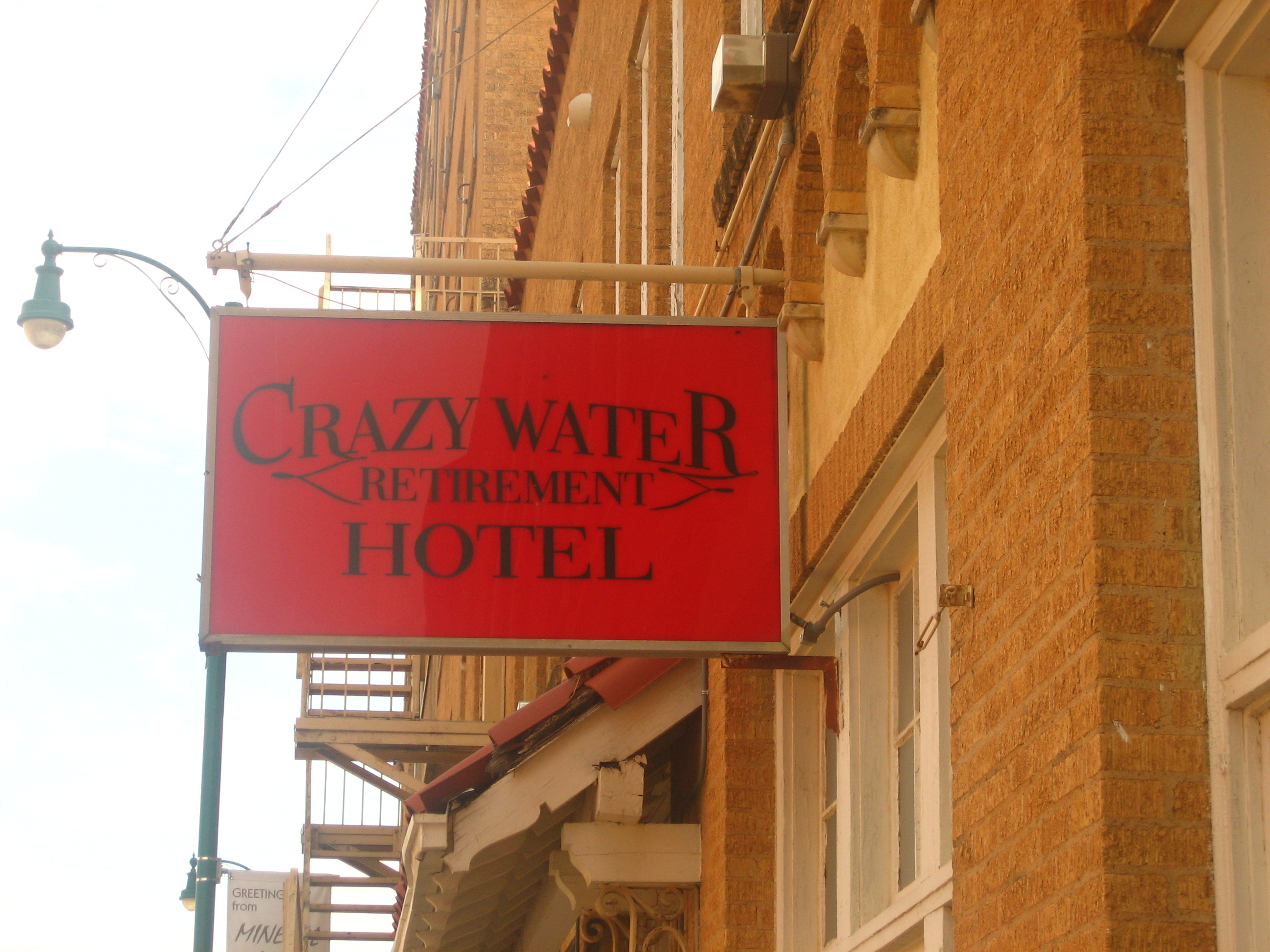
Crazy Water Retirement Hotel

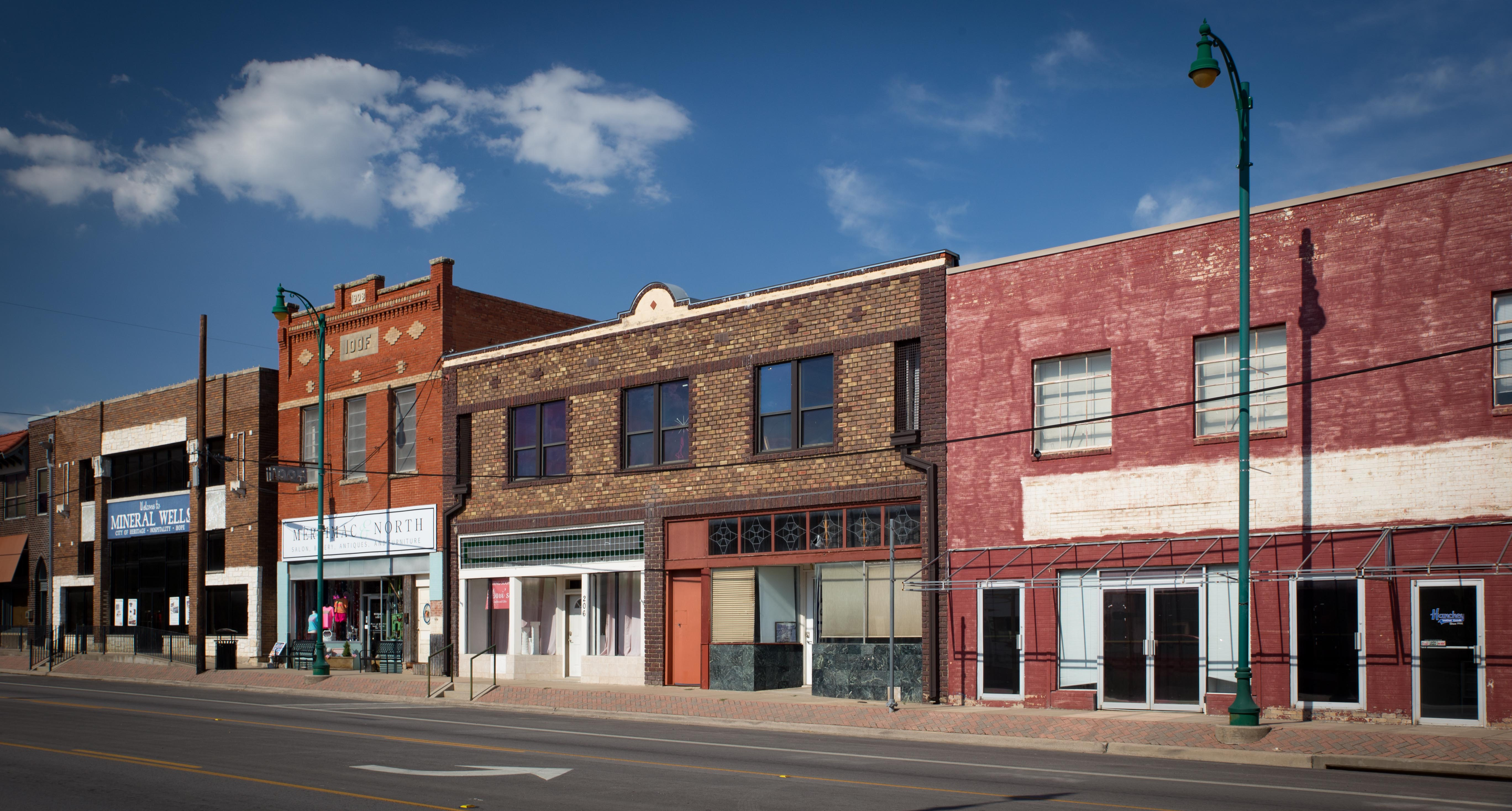
Downtown Mineral Wells

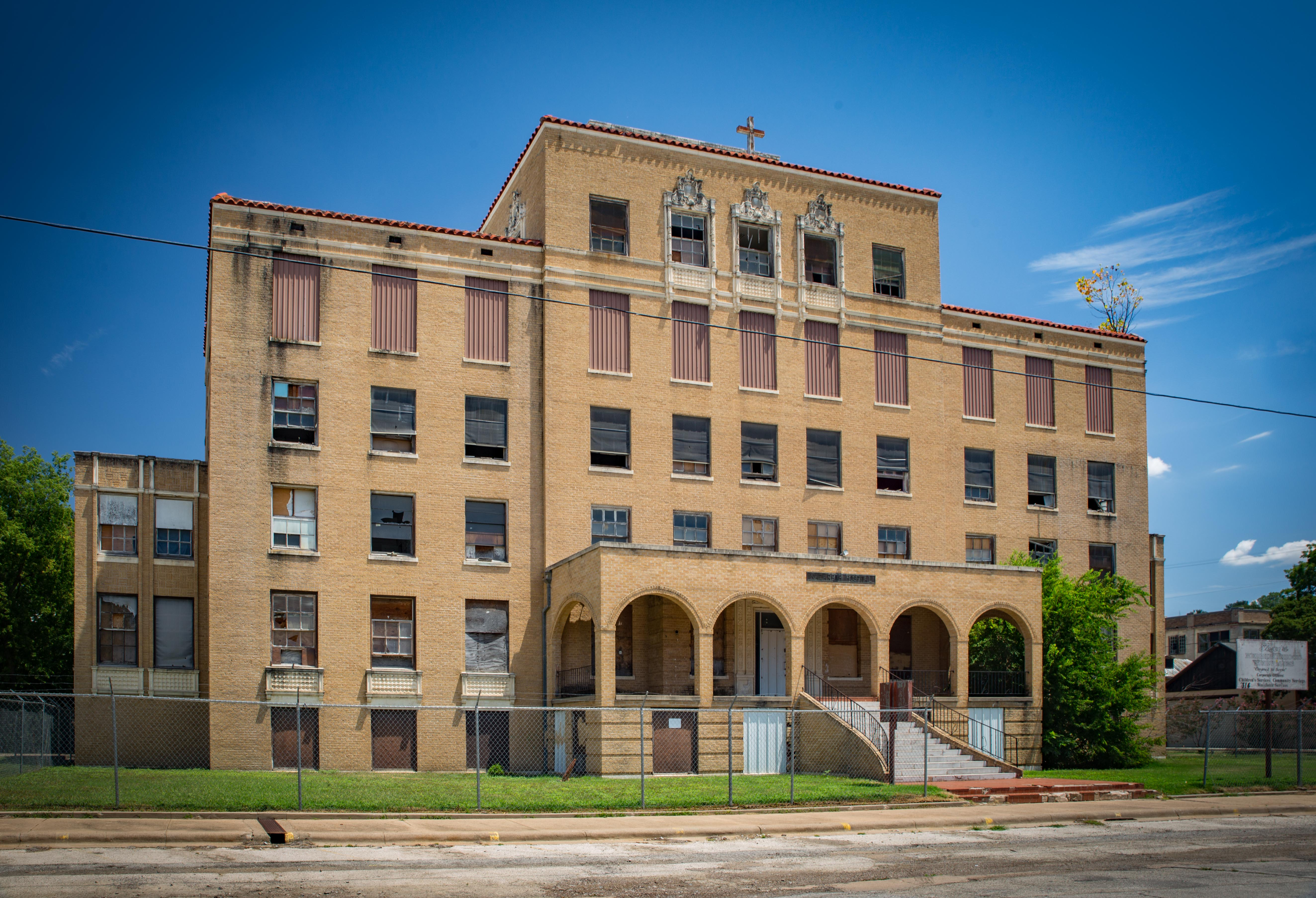
Nazareth Hospital

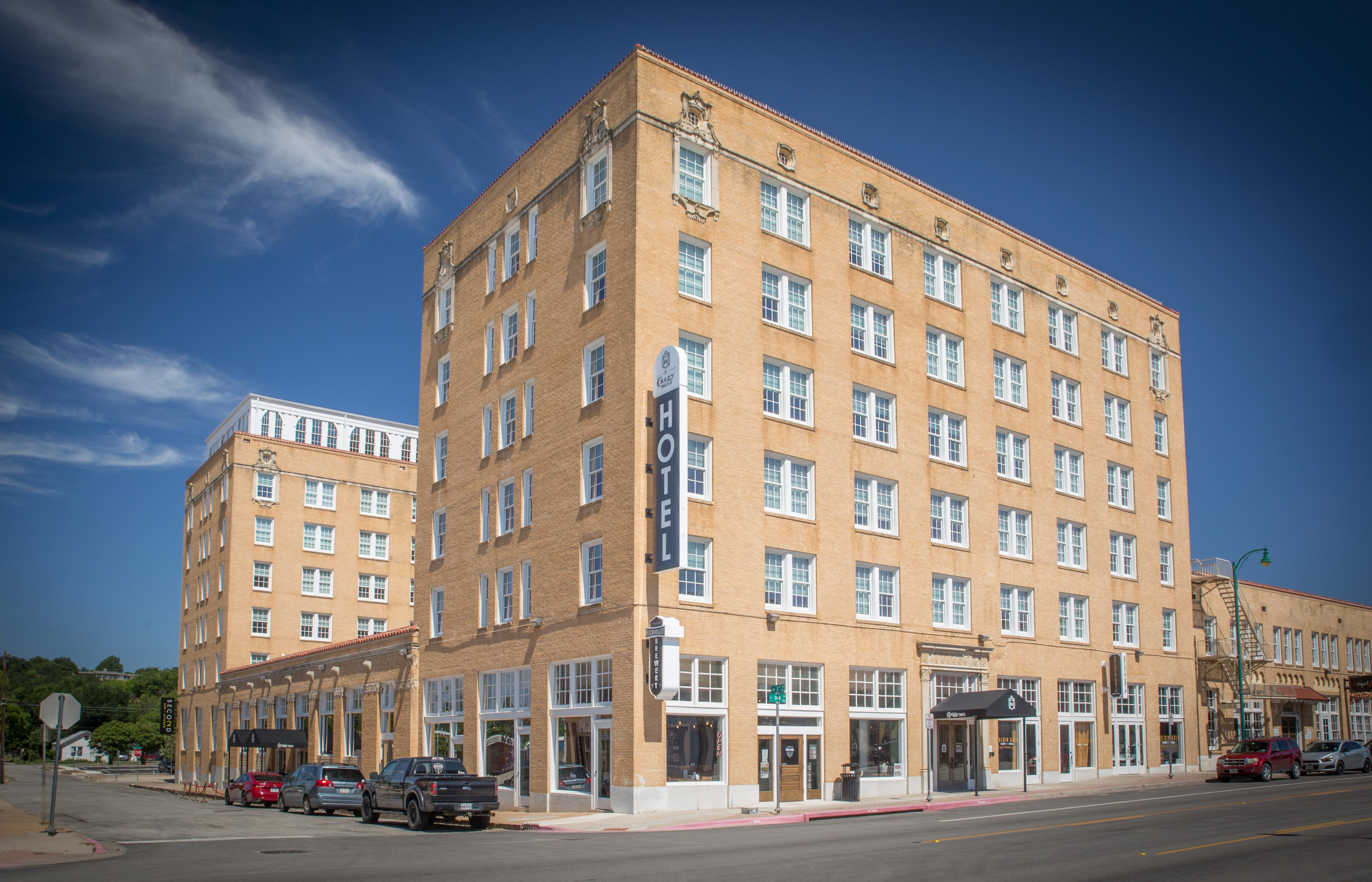
Crazy Water Hotel
