= Talan =

Talan may refer to:

== People ==
- Deb Talan (born 1968), American singer-songwriter
- Jeffrey Talan (born 1971), Dutch football player
- Raúl Talán (1907–1992), Mexican boxer
- Rick Talan (1960–2015), Dutch football player
- Roman Talan (born 1988), Ukrainian pair skater
- Talan Skeels-Piggins (born 1970), British alpine skier

== Places ==
- Talan Island, part of the Spafaryev Islands
- Talan Towers, Kazakhstan
