= Kid Azteca =

Mexican boxer (1913–2002)

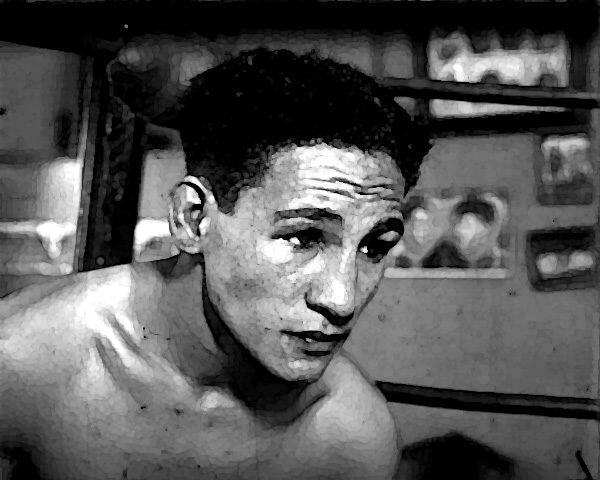

Personal information
- Nickname: Kid Azteca
- Born: Luis Villanueva Páramo; June 21, 1913 Mexico City
- Died: March 16, 2002 (aged 88)
- Weight: Welterweight

Boxing career

Boxing record
- Total fights: 255
- Wins: 193
- Win by KO: 114
- Losses: 49
- Draws: 11
- No contests: 2

Luis Villanueva Páramo (June 21, 1913 – March 16, 2002), best known as Kid Azteca, was a Mexican boxer. Villanueva fought professionally from 1932 to 1961, making him one of a small number of fighters who boxed during four decades.

== Background ==
Luis Villanueva was a native of Tepito, a neighborhood of Mexico City famous for being the birthplace of several other famous international Mexican boxers and wrestlers.

There is not much information available about of his personal life or his beginnings in before he became a pro. In fact, there's some discrepancy about the exact date of his debut. Some sources indicates he went pro in 1926, while other sources indicates his pro debut was July 25, 1930, but officially, it is recorded at 1932. The San Antonio Express reported in 1944 that Villanueva's birth date on his passport was June 21, 1917, and not June 21, 1913. If this is true, he was only 13 when started his career.

He was a right-handed boxer. Villanueva began fighting as "Kid Chino" in Laredo, Texas. "Chino" is a Mexican slang for "curly", and an allusion to his curled hair. It is not clear when his nickname changed, but it is possible it was due to his nationality, when fighting in Texas, in an effort to attract more attention over him. By 1927 he was widely known as Kid Azteca. His trainer at that date was Macario Azocar.

== Boxing career ==
Kid Azteca began boxing on January 1, 1932. He knocked Carlos Garcia out in the first round, in Laredo, Texas. On March 3, and fighting only in his third fight, he beat former world champion Battling Shaw by a decision in ten, also in Laredo.

On June 15, Azteca made his Mexican debut, beating Luis Arizona by a ten round decision in Mexico City. However, on his next bout, lost for the first time, being knocked out in eight rounds by Tommy White on July 1.

On October 23, Azteca, having reeled off four straight victories, fought for a title for the first time. He beat David Velasco by a twelve round decision to obtain the national Welterweight title in Mexico City. Kid Azteca had eleven additional wins in a row, including a victory over Joe Glick, before he fought the future world Middleweight champion Ceferino Garcia on July 11, 1933 at the Olympic Auditorium in Los Angeles, California. He beat Garcia, who would hold Henry Armstrong to a tie as world Middleweight champion, by a ten round decision. Azteca and Garcia held a rematch exactly fourteen days later, at the same location. On rematch, Kid Azteca knocked Garcia out in round eight.

On June 5, 1934, Azteca fought Young Peter Jackson (named after an Australian Heavyweight contender of the 19th century), beating Jackson on points after ten rounds. On July 21, he confronted Baby Joe Gans, another popular fighter of that time, outpointing Gans over ten rounds.

Azteca gradually became a national hero in Mexico after his victory over Garcia. By the time he beat Gans, he was widely regarded as Mexico's most popular fighter of his time. He fought Herbert "Cocoa Kid" Lewis Hardwick, a top rated challenger twice in one week at the beginning of 1935: On January 19, the pair would tie over ten rounds. On January 26, Azteca prevailed on points. On his next bout, he defeated Izzy Jannazzo, another ranked fighter of the time, by a decision in ten on March 2.

Kid Azteca had twelve more bouts, including a successful defense of his Mexican Welterweight title, before he met Rodolfo Casanova (who had lost to Sixto Escobar for the world's Bantamweight title) on May 16, 1936. Azteca lost to Casanova by a ten round decision. In his next fight, July 17 of that year, Kid Azteca faced Ceferino Garcia for the third time, losing by knockout in round five.

Azteca proceeded to win twenty seven of his next thirty one bouts, before meeting future world Welterweight champion Fritzie Zivic on November 24, 1939, losing a decision over ten rounds to Zivic in Houston, Texas.

On December 13, 1940, Azteca and Bobby Pacho, who challenged for a world championship one time, fought to a ten round tie in San Antonio, Texas. Next came two more bouts with Cocoa Kid. These bouts once again took place ten days apart from each other. On January 1, 1941, Azteca won by ten round decision, and on January 11, the two rivals fought to a 10 round no contest.

Azteca lived for a year in Argentina, where he made six fights, five of them in Buenos Aires. Azteca's debut in that South American country came on April 11, 1943, when he knocked Sebastian Romanos out in round nine.

On November 6, 1944, Azteca had a fourth fight with Ceferino Garcia, being defeated by decision in ten at Mexico City. Despite having a five fight losing streak and having lived in Argentina for a year, however, Azteca still held the Mexican Welterweight championship.

Azteca lost to Zivic two more times, both by decision, before actually beating him in their fourth encounter. This took place on February 15, 1947 in Mexico City, and Azteca was able to knock Zivic out in the fifth round. On March 19, Azteca fought Vincente Villavincencio in an unsuccessful bid to conquer the Mexican Middleweight title, being knocked out in round six. He beat Villavincencio in two subsequent fights, both times by decision over ten rounds.

On June 26, 1950, Azteca fought former world Lightweight champion Sammy Angott, losing to the American boxer by points after ten rounds.

With the advent of the television era during the 1950s, Azteca's popularity in Mexico grew more than ever before. Most of his fights were televised, and boxing fans across the country could then watch him fight from their family rooms. Although Kid Azteca spent the rest of his career fighting mostly unknown fighters, his fights drew high ratings for Televisa, Mexico's only public television company at the time.

On February 3, 1961, Azteca knocked out Alfonso Macalara in the first round at Veracruz. This would turn out to be his last professional fight.

Azteca was able to reach a milestone as he became a member of the exclusive group to fight at least two hundred bouts. He also became a member of the also exclusive group of fighters that boxed during four decades, when he knocked Adrian Medieta in three rounds on July 12, 1960 in Pachuca. He retired a little after this date.

He died on March 16, 2002.

== Professional boxing record ==
All information in this section is derived from BoxRec, unless otherwise stated.

=== Official record ===
255 fights	192 wins	47 losses
By knockout	114	9
By decision	77	37
By disqualification	1	1
Draws	11	
No contests	2	
Newspaper decisions/draws	3	

All newspaper decisions are officially regarded as “no decision” bouts and are not counted in the win/loss/draw column.

No.	Result	Record	Opponent	Type	Round, time	Date	Age	Location	Notes
255	Win	192–47–11 (5)	Alfonso Malacara	KO	1 (6)	Feb 3, 1961	47 years, 227 days	Veracruz, Mexico	
254	Win	191–47–11 (5)	Adrian Medieta	KO	3 (10)	Jul 12, 1960	47 years, 21 days	Pachuca, Mexico	
253	Draw	190–47–11 (5)	Kid Filipino	PTS	6	Aug 22, 1959	46 years, 62 days	San Luis Potosi, Mexico	
252	Win	190–47–10 (5)	Guillermo Moreno	KO	6 (10)	Nov 8, 1958	45 years, 140 days	Zitacuaro, Mexico	
251	Win	189–47–10 (5)	Willie Risko	KO	4 (10)	Oct 25, 1958	45 years, 126 days	Monterrey, Mexico	
250	Win	188–47–10 (5)	Willie Risko	KO	4 (10)	Apr 7, 1957	43 years, 290 days	Monterrey, Mexico	
249	Win	187–47–10 (5)	Willie Risko	KO	6 (10)	Jul 28, 1956	43 years, 37 days	San Cristobal, Mexico	
248	Win	186–47–10 (5)	Arturo Cardenas	KO	3 (10)	Jul 7, 1956	43 years, 16 days	Leon, Mexico	
247	Loss	185–47–10 (5)	Joe Borrell	KO	5 (10)	Mar 18, 1956	42 years, 271 days	Queretaro, Mexico	
246	Win	185–46–10 (5)	Roberto Rodriguez	KO	4 (10)	Apr 9, 1955	41 years, 292 days	Queretaro, Mexico	
245	Win	184–46–10 (5)	Jorge Castro	KO	4 (10)	Mar 26, 1955	41 years, 278 days	Acapulco, Mexico	
244	Win	183–46–10 (5)	Sandy Baxter	KO	9 (10)	Mar 10, 1955	41 years, 262 days	Arena Coliseo, Mexico City, Mexico	
243	Win	182–46–10 (5)	Gabriel Diaz	PTS	10	Feb 12, 1955	41 years, 236 days	Monterrey, Mexico	
242	Win	181–46–10 (5)	El Conscripto	PTS	10	Nov 27, 1954	41 years, 159 days	Monterrey, Mexico	
241	Win	180–46–10 (5)	Jorge Castro	KO	6 (10)	Sep 25, 1954	41 years, 96 days	Arena Progreso, Guadalajara, Mexico	
240	Win	179–46–10 (5)	Little Palma	UD	10	Aug 10, 1954	41 years, 50 days	Municipal Auditorium, San Antonio, Texas, US	
239	Win	178–46–10 (5)	Vicente Cantu	TKO	7 (10)	Jul 24, 1954	41 years, 33 days	Arena Progreso, Guadalajara, Mexico	
238	Win	177–46–10 (5)	Ray Zavaleta	KO	4 (10)	May 22, 1954	40 years, 335 days	Arena Progreso, Guadalajara, Mexico	
237	Win	176–46–10 (5)	Carlos Martinez	KO	5 (10)	Mar 13, 1954	40 years, 265 days	Veracruz, Mexico	
236	Win	175–46–10 (5)	Jesse Robles	KO	5 (10)	Feb 26, 1954	40 years, 250 days	Pueblo, Mexico	
235	Win	174–46–10 (5)	Rudy Jimenez	KO	4 (10)	Feb 21, 1954	40 years, 245 days	Nueva Rosita, Mexico	
234	Win	173–46–10 (5)	Kid Filipino	KO	4 (10)	Feb 11, 1954	40 years, 235 days	Club Olimpico, Victoria de Durango, Mexico	
233	Win	172–46–10 (5)	Lucio Moreno	KO	4 (10)	Jan 15, 1954	40 years, 208 days	Arena La Rosita, Torreon, Mexico	
232	Draw	171–46–10 (5)	Perrin Vega	PTS	10	Dec 3, 1953	40 years, 165 days	Club Olimpico, Victoria de Durango, Mexico	
231	Win	171–46–9 (5)	Salvador Davila	KO	5 (10)	Nov 17, 1953	40 years, 149 days	Arena Obrero, Torreon, Mexico	
230	Win	170–46–9 (5)	Joe Borrell	KO	5 (10)	Sep 15, 1953	40 years, 86 days	Club Olimpico, Victoria de Durango, Mexico	
229	Win	169–46–9 (5)	Jorge Castro	TKO	7 (10)	Aug 4, 1953	40 years, 44 days	Club Olimpico, Victoria de Durango, Mexico	
228	Win	168–46–9 (5)	Carlos Martinez	KO	5 (10)	Jul 7, 1953	40 years, 16 days	Club Olimpico, Victoria de Durango, Mexico	
227	Loss	167–46–9 (5)	Machete Garcia	PTS	10	Aug 28, 1952	39 years, 68 days	Bosquez Park, Robstown, Texas, US	
226	Loss	167–45–9 (5)	Juan Padilla	PTS	10	Aug 20, 1952	39 years, 60 days	Nuevo Laredo, Mexico	
225	Win	167–44–9 (5)	Andres Balderas	TKO	3 (10)	Aug 2, 1952	39 years, 42 days	Matamoros, Mexico	
224	Win	166–44–9 (5)	Dennis Woodbury	PTS	10	May 29, 1952	38 years, 343 days	Ciudad Juarez, Mexico	
223	Win	165–44–9 (5)	Vicente Cantu	TKO	5 (10)	Sep 4, 1951	38 years, 75 days	Arena Obrero, Torreon, Mexico	
222	Loss	164–44–9 (5)	Charley Salas	TKO	7 (10)	Aug 21, 1951	38 years, 61 days	Plaza de Toros, Ciudad Juarez, Mexico	
221	Loss	164–43–9 (5)	Eusebio Hernandez	PTS	10	Jan 19, 1951	37 years, 212 days	Auditorio Municipal, Ciudad Juarez, Mexico	
220	Win	164–42–9 (5)	Rafael Gutierrez	KO	9 (10)	Jan 10, 1951	37 years, 203 days	Puebla, Mexico	
219	Win	163–42–9 (5)	Octavio Romo	KO	6 (10)	Nov 14, 1950	37 years, 146 days	Guamuchil, Mexico	
218	Win	162–42–9 (5)	Tommy Ramirez	KO	6 (10)	Jul 19, 1950	37 years, 28 days	Reynosa, Mexico	
217	Loss	161–42–9 (5)	Buddy Holderfield	KO	4 (10)	Jul 1, 1950	37 years, 10 days	Camden, New Jersey, US	
216	Loss	161–41–9 (5)	Sammy Angott	UD	10	Jun 26, 1950	37 years, 5 days	Dudley Field, El Paso, Texas, US	
215	Win	161–40–9 (5)	Joe Danos	KO	10 (10)	May 3, 1950	36 years, 316 days	Auditorio Municipal, Ciudad Juarez, Mexico	
214	Win	160–40–9 (5)	Eusebio Hernandez	KO	7 (10)	Mar 31, 1950	36 years, 283 days	Auditorio Municipal, Ciudad Juarez, Mexico	
213	Win	159–40–9 (5)	Andres Balderas	TKO	10 (12)	Mar 26, 1950	36 years, 278 days	Monterrey, Mexico	
212	Loss	158–40–9 (5)	El Conscripto	TKO	10 (12)	Jan 28, 1950	36 years, 221 days	Guadalajara, Mexico	Lost Mexico welterweight title
211	Win	158–39–9 (5)	Baby Yucatan	KO	4 (10)	Jan 23, 1950	36 years, 216 days	Guadalajara, Mexico	
210	Win	157–39–9 (5)	Jack Breeson	KO	4 (10)	Oct 13, 1949	36 years, 114 days	Ciudad Juarez, Mexico	
209	Win	156–39–9 (5)	Manuel Luevano	KO	5 (10)	Jul 14, 1949	36 years, 23 days	Reynosa, Mexico	
208	Win	155–39–9 (5)	Art Hardy	KO	5 (10)	May 20, 1949	35 years, 333 days	Monumental Plaza de Toros México, Mexico City, Mexico	
207	Draw	154–39–9 (5)	El Conscripto	PTS	10	Oct 24, 1948	35 years, 125 days	Tampico, Mexico	
206	Win	154–39–8 (5)	Nick Moran	PTS	10	Sep 19, 1948	35 years, 90 days	Arena Coliseo, Mexico City, Mexico	Retained Mexico welterweight title
205	Draw	153–39–8 (5)	Kid Filipino	PTS	10	Aug 22, 1948	35 years, 62 days	Tampico, Mexico	
204	Win	153–39–7 (5)	Simon Lucas	PTS	10	Jun 12, 1948	34 years, 357 days	Mexico City, Mexico	
203	Win	152–39–7 (5)	El Conscripto	PTS	10	May 1, 1948	34 years, 315 days	Arena Canada Dry, Guadalajara, Mexico	
202	Win	151–39–7 (5)	El Conscripto	KO	11 (12)	Apr 10, 1948	34 years, 294 days	Arena Coliseo, Mexico City, Mexico	Retained Mexico welterweight title
201	Win	150–39–7 (5)	Nick Moran	PTS	12	Jan 31, 1948	34 years, 224 days	Arena Coliseo, Mexico City, Mexico	Retained Mexico welterweight title
200	Win	149–39–7 (5)	Johnny Mills	KO	2 (10)	Oct 26, 1947	34 years, 127 days	Plaza de Toros, Nuevo Laredo, Mexico	
199	Win	148–39–7 (5)	Melvin Johnson	KO	3 (10)	Oct 13, 1947	34 years, 114 days	Mexicali, Mexico	
198	Loss	147–39–7 (5)	Bert Linam	UD	10	Sep 30, 1947	34 years, 101 days	Municipal Auditorium, San Antonio, Texas, US	
197	Win	147–38–7 (5)	Kid Filipino	KO	5 (10)	Aug 31, 1947	34 years, 71 days	Guadalajara, Mexico	
196	Win	146–38–7 (5)	Bobby Yaeger	KO	4 (10)	Aug 23, 1947	34 years, 63 days	Arena Coliseo, Mexico City, Mexico	
195	Win	145–38–7 (5)	Vicente Villavicencio	PTS	10	Jun 28, 1947	34 years, 7 days	Arena Coliseo, Mexico City, Mexico	
194	Loss	144–38–7 (5)	Vicente Villavicencio	TKO	8 (12)	Mar 19, 1947	33 years, 271 days	Arena Coliseo, Mexico City, Mexico	For vacant Mexico middleweight title
193	Win	144–37–7 (5)	Fritzie Zivic	KO	5 (10)	Feb 1, 1947	33 years, 225 days	Mexico City, Mexico	
192	Win	143–37–7 (5)	Cosby Linson	KO	4 (10)	Nov 9, 1946	33 years, 141 days	Arena Coliseo, Mexico City, Mexico	
191	Loss	142–37–7 (5)	Cosby Linson	SD	10	Oct 2, 1946	33 years, 103 days	Plaza de Toros, Ciudad Juarez, Mexico	
190	Win	142–36–7 (5)	Carlos Malacara	TKO	4 (10)	Sep 7, 1946	33 years, 78 days	Arena Coliseo, Mexico City, Mexico	
189	Win	141–36–7 (5)	Lige Drew	PTS	10	Aug 13, 1946	33 years, 53 days	Ciudad Juarez, Mexico	
188	Win	140–36–7 (5)	Joe Keyes	KO	4 (10)	Jul 13, 1946	33 years, 22 days	Mexico City, Mexico	
187	Win	139–36–7 (5)	Lige Drew	KO	8 (10)	Jul 3, 1946	33 years, 12 days	Ciudad Juarez, Mexico	
186	Win	138–36–7 (5)	Baby Zavala	KO	2 (10)	Jun 15, 1946	32 years, 359 days	Arena Coliseo, Mexico City, Mexico	
185	Loss	137–36–7 (5)	Joe Legon	PTS	10	May 11, 1946	32 years, 324 days	Palacio de Deportes, Havana, Cuba	
184	Win	137–35–7 (5)	Kid Filipino	KO	4 (10)	Apr 17, 1946	32 years, 300 days	Palacio de los Deportes, Gomez Palacio, Mexico	
183	Win	136–35–7 (5)	Melvin Johnson	KO	7 (10)	Apr 6, 1946	32 years, 289 days	Mexico City, Mexico	
182	Win	135–35–7 (5)	Joe Legon	KO	3 (10)	Mar 23, 1946	32 years, 275 days	Arena Coliseo, Mexico City, Mexico	
181	Win	134–35–7 (5)	Howell Steen	UD	10	Feb 12, 1946	32 years, 236 days	Municipal Auditorium, San Antonio, Texas, US	
180	Win	133–35–7 (5)	Frankie Vallejo	KO	5 (10)	Feb 7, 1946	32 years, 231 days	Acapulco, Mexico	
179	Win	132–35–7 (5)	Kid Filipino	KO	8 (12)	Jan 12, 1946	32 years, 205 days	Arena Coliseo, Mexico City, Mexico	Retained Mexico welterweight title
178	Win	131–35–7 (5)	Baby Zavala	KO	9 (10)	Nov 11, 1945	32 years, 143 days	Mexico City, Mexico	
177	Win	130–35–7 (5)	Baby Orizaba	KO	3 (10)	Oct 24, 1945	32 years, 125 days	Orizaba, Mexico	
176	Win	129–35–7 (5)	Artie Dorrell	SD	10	Oct 9, 1945	32 years, 110 days	Municipal Auditorium, San Antonio, Texas, US	
175	Win	128–35–7 (5)	Paul Altman	KO	5 (10)	Jul 21, 1945	32 years, 30 days	Arena Coliseo, Mexico City, Mexico	
174	Loss	127–35–7 (5)	Paul Altman	SD	10	Jun 18, 1945	31 years, 362 days	City Auditorium, Houston, Texas, US	
173	Win	127–34–7 (5)	Benny Williams	PTS	10	May 26, 1945	31 years, 339 days	Mexico City, Mexico	
172	Loss	126–34–7 (5)	Fritzie Zivic	MD	10	May 7, 1945	31 years, 320 days	Municipal Auditorium, San Antonio, Texas, US	
171	Win	126–33–7 (5)	Eddie Cerda	KO	6 (10)	Mar 25, 1945	31 years, 277 days	Municipal Auditorium, San Antonio, Texas, US	
170	Win	125–33–7 (5)	Rodolfo Ramirez	TKO	10 (12)	Jan 13, 1945	31 years, 206 days	Municipal Auditorium, San Antonio, Texas, US	Retained Mexico welterweight title
169	Loss	124–33–7 (5)	Fritzie Zivic	MD	10	Dec 12, 1944	31 years, 174 days	Municipal Auditorium, San Antonio, Texas, US	
168	Win	124–32–7 (5)	Paul Altman	PTS	10	Nov 28, 1944	31 years, 160 days	Municipal Auditorium, San Antonio, Texas, US	
167	Win	123–32–7 (5)	Chino Rodriguez	KO	6 (10)	Nov 18, 1944	31 years, 150 days	Arena Coliseo, Mexico City, Mexico	
166	Loss	122–32–7 (5)	Ceferino Garcia	PTS	10	Oct 6, 1944	31 years, 107 days	Arena Coliseo, Mexico City, Mexico	
165	Loss	122–31–7 (5)	Atilio Caraune	KO	11 (12)	Apr 15, 1944	30 years, 299 days	Estadio Luna Park, Buenos Aires, Argentina	
164	Loss	122–30–7 (5)	Raúl Rodríguez	PTS	12	Dec 1, 1943	30 years, 163 days	Buenos Aires, Argentina	
163	Loss	122–29–7 (5)	Amelio Piceda	PTS	12	Jul 3, 1943	30 years, 12 days	Estadio Luna Park, Buenos Aires, Argentina	
162	Loss	122–28–7 (5)	Guillermo Lopez	PTS	10	Jun 20, 1943	29 years, 364 days	Estadio Luna Park, Buenos Aires, Argentina	
161	Win	122–27–7 (5)	Alfredo Pastoriza	PTS	10	Apr 25, 1943	29 years, 308 days	Buenos Aires, Argentina	
160	Win	121–27–7 (5)	Sebastian Romanos	TKO	9 (10)	Apr 11, 1943	29 years, 294 days	La Plata, Argentina	
159	Win	120–27–7 (5)	Rodolfo Ramirez	PTS	12	Jan 16, 1943	29 years, 209 days	Arena Nacional, Mexico City, Mexico	Retained Mexico welterweight title
158	Loss	119–27–7 (5)	Baby Zavala	PTS	4	Dec 19, 1942	29 years, 181 days	Arena Nacional, Mexico City, Mexico	
157	Win	119–26–7 (5)	Ramiro Orejitas Almagro	PTS	10	Oct 17, 1942	29 years, 118 days	Merida, Mexico	
156	Loss	118–26–7 (5)	Joe Legon	PTS	10	Sep 26, 1942	29 years, 97 days	Arena Cristal, Havana, Cuba	
155	Win	118–25–7 (5)	Battling Kid Ambrosio	KO	4 (10)	Jun 26, 1942	29 years, 5 days	Club Tropical, Colon City, Panama	
154	Loss	117–25–7 (5)	Raul Carabantes	PTS	10	May 24, 1942	28 years, 337 days	Gimnasio Nacional, Panama City, Panama	
153	Loss	117–24–7 (5)	Fabio Hurtado	PTS	10	May 10, 1942	28 years, 323 days	Estadio Olimpico, Panama City, Panama	
152	Win	117–23–7 (5)	Ramiro Orejitas Almagro	KO	4 (10)	Mar 8, 1942	28 years, 260 days	Coliseo Olímpico, Guadalajara, Mexico	
151	Win	116–23–7 (5)	Tony Mar	PTS	10	Feb 28, 1942	28 years, 252 days	Arena Nacional, Mexico City, Mexico	
150	Win	115–23–7 (5)	Manuel Villa II	PTS	10	Feb 14, 1942	28 years, 238 days	Arena Nacional, Mexico City, Mexico	
149	Loss	114–23–7 (5)	California Jackie Wilson	TKO	6 (10), 2:00	Oct 24, 1941	28 years, 125 days	Legion Stadium, Hollywood, California, US	
148	Loss	114–22–7 (5)	Rodolfo Ramirez	PTS	10	Jun 7, 1941	27 years, 351 days	Arena Nacional, Mexico City, Mexico	
147	Win	114–21–7 (5)	Raul Carabantes	PTS	10	Feb 15, 1941	27 years, 239 days	Arena Nacional, Mexico City, Mexico	
146	NC	113–21–7 (5)	Herbert Lewis Hardwick	NC	10	Jan 11, 1941	27 years, 204 days	Arena Nacional, Mexico City, Mexico	Distrito Federal boxing commission changed result from an Azteca win
145	Win	113–21–7 (4)	Herbert Lewis Hardwick	PTS	10	Jan 1, 1941	27 years, 194 days	Arena Nacional, Mexico City, Mexico	
144	Draw	112–21–7 (4)	Bobby Pacho	PTS	10	Dec 13, 1940	27 years, 175 days	Municipal Auditorium, San Antonio, Texas, US	
143	Win	112–21–6 (4)	Casanovita de Ahome	KO	5 (10)	Oct 14, 1940	27 years, 115 days	Mexico City, Mexico	
142	Win	111–21–6 (4)	Benny Britt	KO	1 (10)	Sep 22, 1940	27 years, 93 days	Plaza de Toros, Nuevo Laredo, Mexico	
141	Win	110–21–6 (4)	Manuel Villa I	KO	7 (12)	Sep 10, 1940	27 years, 81 days	Plaza de Toros, Nuevo Laredo, Mexico	Retained Mexico welterweight title
140	Win	109–21–6 (4)	Manuel Villa I	KO	5 (12)	Sep 4, 1940	27 years, 75 days	Arena La Cancha, Torreon, Mexico	Retained Mexico welterweight title
139	Win	108–21–6 (4)	Pedro Ortega	KO	4 (10)	Jun 8, 1940	26 years, 352 days	Mexico City, Mexico	
138	Loss	107–21–6 (4)	Pedro Ortega	PTS	10	Apr 27, 1940	26 years, 311 days	Arena Mexico, Mexico City, Mexico	
137	Loss	107–20–6 (4)	Willie Neyland	PTS	10	Apr 6, 1940	26 years, 290 days	Arena Mexico, Mexico City, Mexico	
136	Win	107–19–6 (4)	Jackie Taylor	KO	3 (10)	Mar 11, 1940	26 years, 264 days	Walkathon Arena, San Antonio, Texas, US	
135	Win	106–19–6 (4)	Cuban Luis	KO	4 (10)	Mar 2, 1940	26 years, 255 days	Xalapa, Mexico	
134	Win	105–19–6 (4)	Carlos Malacara	PTS	10	Feb 17, 1940	26 years, 241 days	Arena Nacional, Mexico City, Mexico	
133	Win	104–19–6 (4)	Kid Hermosillo	PTS	12	Nov 25, 1939	26 years, 157 days	Arena Mexico, Mexico City, Mexico	Retained Mexico welterweight title
132	Win	103–19–6 (4)	Cuban Luis	TKO	2 (10)	Nov 18, 1939	26 years, 150 days	Arena Progreso, Guadalajara, Mexico	
131	Loss	102–19–6 (4)	Fritzie Zivic	UD	10	Oct 24, 1939	26 years, 125 days	Olympiad Arena, Houston, Texas, US	
130	Win	102–18–6 (4)	Cuban Luis	KO	4 (10)	Sep 17, 1939	26 years, 88 days	Plaza de Toros, Nuevo Laredo, Mexico	
129	Win	101–18–6 (4)	Kid Hermosillo	PTS	10	Jul 22, 1939	26 years, 31 days	Arena Mexico, Mexico City, Mexico	
128	Win	100–18–6 (4)	Manuel Villa I	KO	5 (12)	Jun 10, 1939	25 years, 354 days	Arena Nacional, Mexico City, Mexico	Retained Mexico welterweight title
127	Loss	99–18–6 (4)	Leon Zorrita	PTS	10	May 23, 1939	25 years, 336 days	Ciudad Juarez, Mexico	
126	Win	99–17–6 (4)	Eddie Cerda	KO	5 (10)	Mar 18, 1939	25 years, 270 days	Arena Mexico, Mexico City, Mexico	
125	Win	98–17–6 (4)	Eddie McGeever	KO	8 (15), 1:41	Feb 3, 1939	25 years, 227 days	Walkathon Arena, San Antonio, Texas, US	Won USA Texas State welterweight title
124	Win	97–17–6 (4)	Bill McDowell	PTS	10	Jan 30, 1939	25 years, 223 days	40 & 8 Arena, Corpus Christi, Texas, US	
123	Win	96–17–6 (4)	Eddie McGeever	PTS	10	Jan 20, 1939	25 years, 213 days	Municipal Auditorium, San Antonio, Texas, US	
122	Win	95–17–6 (4)	Kenny LaSalle	UD	10	Dec 16, 1938	25 years, 178 days	Walkathon Arena, San Antonio, Texas, US	
121	Win	94–17–6 (4)	Jimmy Scaramozi	KO	2 (10)	Dec 11, 1938	25 years, 173 days	Plaza de Toros, Nuevo Laredo, Mexico	
120	Win	93–17–6 (4)	Billy Deeg	PTS	10	Nov 28, 1938	25 years, 160 days	Walkathon Arena, San Antonio, Texas, US	
119	Win	92–17–6 (4)	Bill McDowell	KO	7 (10)	Nov 14, 1938	25 years, 146 days	High School Stadium, Laredo, Texas, US	
118	Win	91–17–6 (4)	Baby La Paz	PTS	10	Oct 29, 1938	25 years, 130 days	El Toreo de Cuatro Caminos, Mexico City, Mexico	
117	Loss	90–17–6 (4)	Kid Hermosillo	PTS	10	Sep 17, 1938	25 years, 88 days	Mexico City, Mexico	
116	Loss	90–16–6 (4)	Bill McDowell	PTS	10	Aug 24, 1938	25 years, 64 days	40 & 8 Arena, Corpus Christi, Texas, US	
115	Win	90–15–6 (4)	Tracy Cox	PTS	10	Aug 17, 1938	25 years, 57 days	40 & 8 Arena, Corpus Christi, Texas, US	
114	Loss	89–15–6 (4)	Saverio Turiello	PTS	10	Mar 8, 1938	24 years, 260 days	Olympiad Arena, Houston, Texas, US	
113	Win	89–14–6 (4)	Saverio Turiello	PTS	10	Jan 1, 1938	24 years, 194 days	El Toreo de Cuatro Caminos, Mexico City, Mexico	
112	Win	88–14–6 (4)	Pee Wee Jarrell	KO	2 (10)	Sep 25, 1937	24 years, 96 days	Arena Mexico, Mexico City, Mexico	
111	Win	87–14–6 (4)	Mario Ramon	KO	5 (10)	Aug 28, 1937	24 years, 68 days	Arena Mexico, Mexico City, Mexico	
110	Win	86–14–6 (4)	Manuel Villa I	KO	5 (10)	Aug 21, 1937	24 years, 61 days	Arena Cine Ideal, Guadalajara, Mexico	
109	Win	85–14–6 (4)	Willard Brown	PTS	10	Jun 18, 1937	23 years, 362 days	Plaza de Toros, Nuevo Laredo, Mexico	
108	Win	84–14–6 (4)	Roy Calamari	KO	3 (10)	Jun 15, 1937	23 years, 359 days	Olympiad Arena, Houston, Texas, US	
107	Win	83–14–6 (4)	Jack Etheridge	KO	2 (10)	May 28, 1937	23 years, 341 days	Plaza de Toros, Nuevo Laredo, Mexico	
106	Win	82–14–6 (4)	Kenny LaSalle	PTS	10	May 18, 1937	23 years, 331 days	Olympiad Arena, Houston, Texas, US	
105	Win	81–14–6 (4)	Midget Mexico	TKO	4 (10)	May 14, 1937	23 years, 327 days	Plaza de Toros, Nuevo Laredo, Mexico	
104	Win	80–14–6 (4)	Ventura Arana	KO	2 (10)	Apr 28, 1937	23 years, 311 days	Monterrey, Mexico	
103	Win	79–14–6 (4)	Eddie Cerda	PTS	10	Mar 3, 1937	23 years, 255 days	Merida, Mexico	
102	Win	78–14–6 (4)	Gallito Ramirez	KO	9 (10)	Feb 14, 1937	23 years, 238 days	Merida, Mexico	
101	Win	77–14–6 (4)	Al Manfredo	PTS	10	Jan 1, 1937	23 years, 194 days	El Toreo de Cuatro Caminos, Mexico City, Mexico	
100	Win	76–14–6 (4)	Tracy Cox	PTS	10	Dec 14, 1936	23 years, 176 days	Municipal Auditorium, San Antonio, Texas, US	
99	Win	75–14–6 (4)	Manuel Villa I	PTS	12	Nov 7, 1936	23 years, 139 days	Arena Nacional, Mexico City, Mexico	Retained Mexico welterweight title
98	Win	74–14–6 (4)	Kid Hermosillo	KO	9 (10)	Aug 8, 1936	23 years, 48 days	Hermosillo, Mexico	
97	Loss	73–14–6 (4)	Ceferino Garcia	KO	5 (10), 1:17	Jul 17, 1936	23 years, 26 days	Legion Stadium, Hollywood, California, US	
96	Loss	73–13–6 (4)	Rodolfo Casanova	PTS	10	May 16, 1936	22 years, 330 days	Arena Nacional, Mexico City, Mexico	
95	Win	73–12–6 (4)	Pepe Saldana	PTS	10	Apr 7, 1936	22 years, 291 days	Tampico, Mexico	
94	Win	72–12–6 (4)	German Rico	PTS	10	Mar 29, 1936	22 years, 282 days	Tampico, Mexico	
93	Win	71–12–6 (4)	Eddie Cerda	PTS	12	Mar 14, 1936	22 years, 267 days	Arena Nacional, Mexico City, Mexico	Won vacant Mexico welterweight title
92	Win	70–12–6 (4)	Pancho Lawler	PTS	10	Jan 3, 1936	22 years, 196 days	Pachuca, Mexico	
91	Win	69–12–6 (4)	Chief Parris	PTS	10	Nov 23, 1935	22 years, 155 days	Arena Nacional, Mexico City, Mexico	
90	Win	68–12–6 (4)	Tommy Collins	KO	7 (10)	Sep 6, 1935	22 years, 77 days	American Legion Arena, Harlingen, Texas, US	
89	Loss	67–12–6 (4)	Chief Parris	PTS	10	Sep 3, 1935	22 years, 74 days	Guest Arena, Houston, Texas, US	
88	Win	67–11–6 (4)	Chief Parris	PTS	10	Aug 30, 1935	22 years, 70 days	Plaza de Toros, Nuevo Laredo, Mexico	
87	Win	66–11–6 (4)	Al Chavez	KO	2 (10)	Jul 4, 1935	22 years, 13 days	Merida, Mexico	
86	Win	65–11–6 (4)	Renato Torres	KO	3 (10)	Jun 12, 1935	21 years, 356 days	Guatemala City, Guatemala	
85	Loss	64–11–6 (4)	Bep van Klaveren	PTS	10	May 24, 1935	21 years, 337 days	Legion Stadium, Hollywood, California, US	
84	Win	64–10–6 (4)	Morrie Sherman	PTS	10	Apr 6, 1935	21 years, 289 days	Arena Nacional, Mexico City, Mexico	
83	Win	63–10–6 (4)	Izzy Jannazzo	PTS	10	Mar 2, 1935	21 years, 254 days	Arena Nacional, Mexico City, Mexico	
82	Win	62–10–6 (4)	Herbert Lewis Hardwick	PTS	10	Jan 26, 1935	21 years, 219 days	Arena Nacional, Mexico City, Mexico	
81	Draw	61–10–6 (4)	Herbert Lewis Hardwick	PTS	10	Jan 19, 1935	21 years, 212 days	Arena Nacional, Mexico City, Mexico	
80	Win	61–10–5 (4)	Kenny LaSalle	PTS	10	Nov 10, 1934	21 years, 142 days	Arena Nacional, Mexico City, Mexico	
79	Win	60–10–5 (4)	Kenny LaSalle	PTS	10	Oct 27, 1934	21 years, 128 days	Arena Nacional, Mexico City, Mexico	
78	Win	59–10–5 (4)	Joe King	KO	1 (10)	Sep 29, 1934	21 years, 100 days	Arena Cine Royal, Guadalajara, Mexico	
77	Win	58–10–5 (4)	Eddie Wolfe	PTS	10	Sep 22, 1934	21 years, 93 days	Arena Nacional, Mexico City, Mexico	
76	Win	57–10–5 (4)	Benny Levine	KO	4 (10)	Aug 30, 1934	21 years, 70 days	Arena Nacional, Mexico City, Mexico	
75	Win	56–10–5 (4)	Pat Murphy	KO	5 (10)	Aug 4, 1934	21 years, 44 days	Arena Nacional, Mexico City, Mexico	
74	Win	55–10–5 (4)	Baby Joe Gans	PTS	10	Jul 22, 1934	21 years, 31 days	Arena Nacional, Mexico City, Mexico	
73	Win	54–10–5 (4)	Young Peter Jackson	PTS	10	Jun 5, 1934	20 years, 349 days	Olympic Auditorium, Los Angeles, California, US	
72	Draw	53–10–5 (4)	Ritchie Mack	PTS	10	May 16, 1934	20 years, 329 days	Arena Nacional, Mexico City, Mexico	
71	Loss	53–10–4 (4)	Ritchie Mack	MD	10	Apr 3, 1934	20 years, 286 days	Steer Stadium, Dallas, Texas, US	
70	Win	53–9–4 (4)	Cowboy Eddie Anderson	PTS	10	Mar 15, 1934	20 years, 267 days	Liberty Hall, El Paso, Texas, US	
69	Win	52–9–4 (4)	Ritchie Mack	PTS	10	Mar 10, 1934	20 years, 262 days	Arena Nacional, Mexico City, Mexico	
68	Win	51–9–4 (4)	Bernardo Pena	KO	3 (10)	Feb 20, 1934	20 years, 244 days	Cordova, Mexico	
67	Win	50–9–4 (4)	Manuel Villa I	KO	9 (10)	Feb 17, 1934	20 years, 241 days	Arena Nacional, Mexico City, Mexico	
66	Draw	49–9–4 (4)	Paulie Walker	PTS	10	Dec 2, 1933	20 years, 164 days	Arena Nacional, Mexico City, Mexico	
65	Win	49–9–3 (4)	Al Schaff	TKO	5 (10)	Nov 18, 1933	20 years, 150 days	Arena Nacional, Mexico City, Mexico	
64	Win	48–9–3 (4)	Martin Barbotteux	PTS	10	Nov, 1933	N/A	Monterrey, Mexico	Exact date uncertain
63	Win	47–9–3 (4)	Elias Alvarez	KO	? (10)	Oct 28, 1933	20 years, 129 days	Puebla, Mexico	Exact result uncertain
62	Win	46–9–3 (4)	Leonard Bennett	PTS	10	Oct, 1933	N/A	Arena Nacional, Mexico City, Mexico	Exact date and result uncertain
61	Loss	45–9–3 (4)	Leonard Bennett	DQ	6 (10)	Sep 23, 1933	20 years, 94 days	Arena Nacional, Mexico City, Mexico	
60	Win	45–8–3 (4)	Meyer Grace	KO	4 (10)	Aug 19, 1933	20 years, 59 days	Arena Nacional, Mexico City, Mexico	
59	Win	44–8–3 (4)	Ceferino Garcia	TKO	8 (10)	Jul 25, 1933	20 years, 34 days	Olympic Auditorium, Los Angeles, California, US	
58	Win	43–8–3 (4)	Ceferino Garcia	PTS	10	Jul 11, 1933	20 years, 20 days	Olympic Auditorium, Los Angeles, California, US	
57	Loss	42–8–3 (4)	Eddie Frisco	PTS	10	Jun, 1933	N/A	Merida, Mexico	Exact date uncertain
56	Win	42–7–3 (4)	Relampago Saguero	PTS	10	May 27, 1933	19 years, 340 days	Arena Nacional, Mexico City, Mexico	
55	Win	41–7–3 (4)	Eddie Frisco	PTS	10	May 13, 1933	19 years, 326 days	Arena Nacional, Mexico City, Mexico	
54	Win	40–7–3 (4)	Harry Galfund	KO	2 (10)	Apr 2, 1933	19 years, 285 days	El Toreo de Cuatro Caminos, Mexico City, Mexico	
53	Win	39–7–3 (4)	David Velasco	PTS	10	Mar, 1933	N/A	Tampico, Mexico	Exact date uncertain
52	Win	38–7–3 (4)	Tommy White	PTS	10	Mar 11, 1933	19 years, 263 days	Arena Nacional, Mexico City, Mexico	
51	Win	37–7–3 (4)	Joe Glick	PTS	10	Feb 18, 1933	19 years, 242 days	Arena Nacional, Mexico City, Mexico	
50	Win	36–7–3 (4)	Luis Alvarado	PTS	10	Jan, 1933	N/A	Merida, Mexico	Exact date uncertain
49	Win	35–7–3 (4)	Eddie Cerda	PTS	10	Jan, 1933	N/A	Merida, Mexico	Exact date uncertain
48	Win	34–7–3 (4)	Armando Aguilar	PTS	10	Dec, 1932	N/A	Merida, Mexico	Exact date uncertain
47	Win	33–7–3 (4)	Martin Barbotteux	PTS	10	Nov, 1932	N/A	Arena Nacional, Mexico City, Mexico	Exact date uncertain
46	Win	32–7–3 (4)	David Velasco	PTS	12	Oct 23, 1932	19 years, 124 days	El Toreo de Cuatro Caminos, Mexico City, Mexico	Won vacant Mexico welterweight title
45	Win	31–7–3 (4)	Manuel Luna	KO	6 (10)	Oct 9, 1932	19 years, 110 days	El Toreo de Cuatro Caminos, Mexico City, Mexico	
44	Win	30–7–3 (4)	Loncho Perez	KO	2 (10)	Sep 16, 1932	19 years, 87 days	El Toreo de Cuatro Caminos, Mexico City, Mexico	
43	Win	29–7–3 (4)	Ray Macias	PTS	10	Sep 10, 1932	19 years, 81 days	Arena Nacional, Mexico City, Mexico	
42	Win	28–7–3 (4)	Felipe Orozco	TKO	7 (10)	Aug 28, 1932	19 years, 68 days	Arena Nacional, Mexico City, Mexico	
41	Win	27–7–3 (4)	Luis Portela	KO	9 (10)	Aug 13, 1932	19 years, 53 days	Arena Nacional, Mexico City, Mexico	
40	Loss	26–7–3 (4)	Raúl Talán	PTS	10	Jul 30, 1932	19 years, 39 days	Arena Nacional, Mexico City, Mexico	
39	Win	26–6–3 (4)	Alfredo Gaona	PTS	10	Jul, 1932	N/A	Arena Nacional, Mexico City, Mexico	Exact date and location unknown
38	Loss	25–6–3 (4)	Tommy White	KO	8 (10)	Jun 27, 1932	19 years, 6 days	Arena Nacional, Mexico City, Mexico	
37	Win	25–5–3 (4)	Luis Arizona	DQ	7 (10)	May 28, 1932	18 years, 342 days	Arena Nacional, Mexico City, Mexico	
36	Win	24–5–3 (4)	Carlos Garcia	PTS	10	Mar 23, 1932	18 years, 276 days	Arena Tex Rickard, Nuevo Laredo, Mexico	
35	Win	23–5–3 (4)	Carlos Garcia	PTS	10	Feb 17, 1932	18 years, 241 days	Arena Tex Rickard, Nuevo Laredo, Mexico	
34	Win	22–5–3 (4)	Battling Shaw	PTS	10	Jan 31, 1932	18 years, 224 days	Arena Tex Rickard, Nuevo Laredo, Mexico	
33	NC	21–5–3 (4)	Manuel Cermeno	NC	5 (10)	Jan 28, 1932	18 years, 221 days	Nuevo Leon, Mexico	
32	Win	21–5–3 (3)	Paul Wangley	KO	5 (10)	Jan, 1932	N/A	Tulsa, Alabama	Exact date unknown
31	Draw	20–5–3 (3)	Armando Aguilar	PTS	10	Dec 20, 1931	18 years, 182 days	Arena Tex Rickard, Nuevo Laredo, Mexico	
30	Win	20–5–2 (3)	Antonio Escareno	TKO	6 (10)	Nov 12, 1931	18 years, 144 days	Saltillo, Mexico	
29	Win	19–5–2 (3)	Battling Vega	TKO	3 (10)	Oct 26, 1931	18 years, 127 days	Saltillo, Mexico	
28	Loss	18–5–2 (3)	Battling Shaw	PTS	10	Oct 18, 1931	18 years, 119 days	Nuevo Laredo, Mexico	
27	Win	18–4–2 (3)	Jorge Monzon	TKO	2 (10)	Aug 5, 1931	18 years, 45 days	Nuevo Laredo, Mexico	
26	Win	17–4–2 (3)	Bearcat Joe Barrera	KO	3 (8)	Jul 8, 1931	18 years, 17 days	Arena Tex Rickard, Nuevo Laredo, Mexico	
25	Win	16–4–2 (3)	Johnson Harper	KO	3 (8)	Jun 24, 1931	18 years, 3 days	Arena Tex Rickard, Nuevo Laredo, Mexico	
24	Win	15–4–2 (3)	Chato Flores	KO	6 (8)	May 20, 1931	17 years, 333 days	Arena Tex Rickard, Nuevo Laredo, Mexico	
23	Win	14–4–2 (3)	Guero Pena	PTS	8	May 5, 1931	17 years, 318 days	Arena Tex Rickard, Nuevo Laredo, Mexico	
22	Win	13–4–2 (3)	Tommy K.O. Mahavier	KO	4 (8)	Apr 26, 1931	17 years, 309 days	Square Garden Ring, Matamoros, Mexico	
21	Win	12–4–2 (3)	Bearcat Joe Barrera	PTS	8	Apr 8, 1931	17 years, 291 days	Riverside Square Garden, Nuevo Laredo, Mexico	
20	Win	11–4–2 (3)	Newsboy Eddie Lopez	NWS	10	Mar 24, 1931	17 years, 276 days	Beethoven Hall, San Antonio, Texas, US	
19	Draw	11–4–2 (2)	Bearcat Joe Barrera	PTS	6	Mar 22, 1931	17 years, 274 days	Plaza de Toros, Nuevo Laredo, Mexico	
18	Win	11–4–1 (2)	Kid Chocolate	TKO	? (10)	Feb 18, 1931	17 years, 242 days	Riverside Square Garden, Nuevo Laredo, Mexico	
17	Win	10–4–1 (2)	Battling Ward	TKO	5 (10)	Jan 20, 1931	17 years, 213 days	Plaza de Toros, Nuevo Laredo, Mexico	
16	Loss	9–4–1 (2)	Brooks Hooper	NWS	10	Jan 13, 1931	17 years, 206 days	Beethoven Hall, San Antonio, Texas, US	
15	Loss	9–4–1 (1)	Fausto Velasco	NWS	10	Dec 30, 1930	17 years, 192 days	Beethoven Hall, San Antonio, Texas, US	
14	Win	9–4–1	Fausto Velasco	TKO	3 (10)	Dec 12, 1930	17 years, 174 days	Plaza de Toros, Nuevo Laredo, Mexico	
13	Draw	8–4–1	Kid Chocolate	PTS	6	Nov 5, 1930	17 years, 137 days	Riverside Square Garden, Nuevo Laredo, Mexico	Not to be confused with Kid Chocolate
12	Loss	8–4	Enrique Sada	PTS	6	Oct 1, 1930	17 years, 102 days	Riverside Square Garden, Nuevo Laredo, Mexico	
11	Win	8–3	Texas Kid	KO	1 (6)	Aug 20, 1930	17 years, 60 days	Riverside Square Garden, Nuevo Laredo, Mexico	
10	Win	7–3	Kid Flores	KO	1 (6)	Jul 30, 1930	17 years, 39 days	Riverside Square Garden, Nuevo Laredo, Mexico	
9	Win	6–3	Kid Cortinas	KO	? (6)	Jul 30, 1930	17 years, 39 days	Riverside Square Garden, Nuevo Laredo, Mexico	
8	Loss	5–3	Santos Delgado	PTS	6	Jul 4, 1930	17 years, 13 days	Riverside Square Garden, Nuevo Laredo, Mexico	
7	Win	5–2	Jimmy Harwell	PTS	6	Jun 29, 1930	17 years, 8 days	Plaza de Toros, Nuevo Laredo, Mexico	
6	Win	4–2	Texas Kid	PTS	6	Jun 6, 1930	16 years, 350 days	Escuela Hidalgo Arena, Nuevo Laredo, Mexico	
5	Win	3–2	Jesus Gaitan	PTS	6	May 18, 1930	16 years, 331 days	Plaza de Toros, Nuevo Laredo, Mexico	
4	Win	2–2	Jimmy Harwell	KO	3 (6)	Apr 20, 1930	16 years, 303 days	Plaza de Toros, Nuevo Laredo, Mexico	
3	Win	1–2	Cipriano Castillo	PTS	4	Mar 23, 1930	16 years, 275 days	Plaza de Toros, Nuevo Laredo, Mexico	
2	Loss	0–2	Pancho Aranda	PTS	6	Oct 20, 1929	16 years, 121 days	Plaza de Toros, Nuevo Laredo, Mexico	
1	Loss	0–1	Pancho Aranda	PTS	6	Sep 1, 1929	16 years, 72 days	Salon Montecarlo, Nuevo Laredo, Mexico	

=== Unofficial record ===
255 fights	193 wins	49 losses
By knockout	114	9
By decision	78	39
By disqualification	1	1
Draws	11	
No contests	2	

Record with the inclusion of newspaper decisions in the win/loss/draw column.

No.	Result	Record	Opponent	Type	Round, time	Date	Age	Location	Notes
255	Win	193–49–11 (2)	Alfonso Malacara	KO	1 (6)	Feb 3, 1961	47 years, 227 days	Veracruz, Mexico	
254	Win	192–49–11 (2)	Adrian Medieta	KO	3 (10)	Jul 12, 1960	47 years, 21 days	Pachuca, Mexico	
253	Draw	191–49–11 (2)	Kid Filipino	PTS	6	Aug 22, 1959	46 years, 62 days	San Luis Potosi, Mexico	
252	Win	191–49–10 (2)	Guillermo Moreno	KO	6 (10)	Nov 8, 1958	45 years, 140 days	Zitacuaro, Mexico	
251	Win	190–49–10 (2)	Willie Risko	KO	4 (10)	Oct 25, 1958	45 years, 126 days	Monterrey, Mexico	
250	Win	189–49–10 (2)	Willie Risko	KO	4 (10)	Apr 7, 1957	43 years, 290 days	Monterrey, Mexico	
249	Win	188–49–10 (2)	Willie Risko	KO	6 (10)	Jul 28, 1956	43 years, 37 days	San Cristobal, Mexico	
248	Win	187–49–10 (2)	Arturo Cardenas	KO	3 (10)	Jul 7, 1956	43 years, 16 days	Leon, Mexico	
247	Loss	186–49–10 (2)	Joe Borrell	KO	5 (10)	Mar 18, 1956	42 years, 271 days	Queretaro, Mexico	
246	Win	186–48–10 (2)	Roberto Rodriguez	KO	4 (10)	Apr 9, 1955	41 years, 292 days	Queretaro, Mexico	
245	Win	185–48–10 (2)	Jorge Castro	KO	4 (10)	Mar 26, 1955	41 years, 278 days	Acapulco, Mexico	
244	Win	184–48–10 (2)	Sandy Baxter	KO	9 (10)	Mar 10, 1955	41 years, 262 days	Arena Coliseo, Mexico City, Mexico	
243	Win	183–48–10 (2)	Gabriel Diaz	PTS	10	Feb 12, 1955	41 years, 236 days	Monterrey, Mexico	
242	Win	182–48–10 (2)	El Conscripto	PTS	10	Nov 27, 1954	41 years, 159 days	Monterrey, Mexico	
241	Win	181–48–10 (2)	Jorge Castro	KO	6 (10)	Sep 25, 1954	41 years, 96 days	Arena Progreso, Guadalajara, Mexico	
240	Win	180–48–10 (2)	Little Palma	UD	10	Aug 10, 1954	41 years, 50 days	Municipal Auditorium, San Antonio, Texas, US	
239	Win	179–48–10 (2)	Vicente Cantu	TKO	7 (10)	Jul 24, 1954	41 years, 33 days	Arena Progreso, Guadalajara, Mexico	
238	Win	178–48–10 (2)	Ray Zavaleta	KO	4 (10)	May 22, 1954	40 years, 335 days	Arena Progreso, Guadalajara, Mexico	
237	Win	177–48–10 (2)	Carlos Martinez	KO	5 (10)	Mar 13, 1954	40 years, 265 days	Veracruz, Mexico	
236	Win	176–48–10 (2)	Jesse Robles	KO	5 (10)	Feb 26, 1954	40 years, 250 days	Pueblo, Mexico	
235	Win	175–48–10 (2)	Rudy Jimenez	KO	4 (10)	Feb 21, 1954	40 years, 245 days	Nueva Rosita, Mexico	
234	Win	174–48–10 (2)	Kid Filipino	KO	4 (10)	Feb 11, 1954	40 years, 235 days	Club Olimpico, Victoria de Durango, Mexico	
233	Win	173–48–10 (2)	Lucio Moreno	KO	4 (10)	Jan 15, 1954	40 years, 208 days	Arena La Rosita, Torreon, Mexico	
232	Draw	172–48–10 (2)	Perrin Vega	PTS	10	Dec 3, 1953	40 years, 165 days	Club Olimpico, Victoria de Durango, Mexico	
231	Win	172–48–9 (2)	Salvador Davila	KO	5 (10)	Nov 17, 1953	40 years, 149 days	Arena Obrero, Torreon, Mexico	
230	Win	171–48–9 (2)	Joe Borrell	KO	5 (10)	Sep 15, 1953	40 years, 86 days	Club Olimpico, Victoria de Durango, Mexico	
229	Win	170–48–9 (2)	Jorge Castro	TKO	7 (10)	Aug 4, 1953	40 years, 44 days	Club Olimpico, Victoria de Durango, Mexico	
228	Win	169–48–9 (2)	Carlos Martinez	KO	5 (10)	Jul 7, 1953	40 years, 16 days	Club Olimpico, Victoria de Durango, Mexico	
227	Loss	168–48–9 (2)	Machete Garcia	PTS	10	Aug 28, 1952	39 years, 68 days	Bosquez Park, Robstown, Texas, US	
226	Loss	168–47–9 (2)	Juan Padilla	PTS	10	Aug 20, 1952	39 years, 60 days	Nuevo Laredo, Mexico	
225	Win	168–46–9 (2)	Andres Balderas	TKO	3 (10)	Aug 2, 1952	39 years, 42 days	Matamoros, Mexico	
224	Win	167–46–9 (2)	Dennis Woodbury	PTS	10	May 29, 1952	38 years, 343 days	Ciudad Juarez, Mexico	
223	Win	166–46–9 (2)	Vicente Cantu	TKO	5 (10)	Sep 4, 1951	38 years, 75 days	Arena Obrero, Torreon, Mexico	
222	Loss	165–46–9 (2)	Charley Salas	TKO	7 (10)	Aug 21, 1951	38 years, 61 days	Plaza de Toros, Ciudad Juarez, Mexico	
221	Loss	165–45–9 (2)	Eusebio Hernandez	PTS	10	Jan 19, 1951	37 years, 212 days	Auditorio Municipal, Ciudad Juarez, Mexico	
220	Win	165–44–9 (2)	Rafael Gutierrez	KO	9 (10)	Jan 10, 1951	37 years, 203 days	Puebla, Mexico	
219	Win	164–44–9 (2)	Octavio Romo	KO	6 (10)	Nov 14, 1950	37 years, 146 days	Guamuchil, Mexico	
218	Win	163–44–9 (2)	Tommy Ramirez	KO	6 (10)	Jul 19, 1950	37 years, 28 days	Reynosa, Mexico	
217	Loss	162–44–9 (2)	Buddy Holderfield	KO	4 (10)	Jul 1, 1950	37 years, 10 days	Camden, New Jersey, US	
216	Loss	162–43–9 (2)	Sammy Angott	UD	10	Jun 26, 1950	37 years, 5 days	Dudley Field, El Paso, Texas, US	
215	Win	162–42–9 (2)	Joe Danos	KO	10 (10)	May 3, 1950	36 years, 316 days	Auditorio Municipal, Ciudad Juarez, Mexico	
214	Win	161–42–9 (2)	Eusebio Hernandez	KO	7 (10)	Mar 31, 1950	36 years, 283 days	Auditorio Municipal, Ciudad Juarez, Mexico	
213	Win	160–42–9 (2)	Andres Balderas	TKO	10 (12)	Mar 26, 1950	36 years, 278 days	Monterrey, Mexico	
212	Loss	159–42–9 (2)	El Conscripto	TKO	10 (12)	Jan 28, 1950	36 years, 221 days	Guadalajara, Mexico	Lost Mexico welterweight title
211	Win	159–41–9 (2)	Baby Yucatan	KO	4 (10)	Jan 23, 1950	36 years, 216 days	Guadalajara, Mexico	
210	Win	158–41–9 (2)	Jack Breeson	KO	4 (10)	Oct 13, 1949	36 years, 114 days	Ciudad Juarez, Mexico	
209	Win	157–41–9 (2)	Manuel Luevano	KO	5 (10)	Jul 14, 1949	36 years, 23 days	Reynosa, Mexico	
208	Win	156–41–9 (2)	Art Hardy	KO	5 (10)	May 20, 1949	35 years, 333 days	Monumental Plaza de Toros México, Mexico City, Mexico	
207	Draw	155–41–9 (2)	El Conscripto	PTS	10	Oct 24, 1948	35 years, 125 days	Tampico, Mexico	
206	Win	155–41–8 (2)	Nick Moran	PTS	10	Sep 19, 1948	35 years, 90 days	Arena Coliseo, Mexico City, Mexico	Retained Mexico welterweight title
205	Draw	154–41–8 (2)	Kid Filipino	PTS	10	Aug 22, 1948	35 years, 62 days	Tampico, Mexico	
204	Win	154–41–7 (2)	Simon Lucas	PTS	10	Jun 12, 1948	34 years, 357 days	Mexico City, Mexico	
203	Win	153–41–7 (2)	El Conscripto	PTS	10	May 1, 1948	34 years, 315 days	Arena Canada Dry, Guadalajara, Mexico	
202	Win	152–41–7 (2)	El Conscripto	KO	11 (12)	Apr 10, 1948	34 years, 294 days	Arena Coliseo, Mexico City, Mexico	Retained Mexico welterweight title
201	Win	151–41–7 (2)	Nick Moran	PTS	12	Jan 31, 1948	34 years, 224 days	Arena Coliseo, Mexico City, Mexico	Retained Mexico welterweight title
200	Win	150–41–7 (2)	Johnny Mills	KO	2 (10)	Oct 26, 1947	34 years, 127 days	Plaza de Toros, Nuevo Laredo, Mexico	
199	Win	149–41–7 (2)	Melvin Johnson	KO	3 (10)	Oct 13, 1947	34 years, 114 days	Mexicali, Mexico	
198	Loss	148–41–7 (2)	Bert Linam	UD	10	Sep 30, 1947	34 years, 101 days	Municipal Auditorium, San Antonio, Texas, US	
197	Win	148–40–7 (2)	Kid Filipino	KO	5 (10)	Aug 31, 1947	34 years, 71 days	Guadalajara, Mexico	
196	Win	147–40–7 (2)	Bobby Yaeger	KO	4 (10)	Aug 23, 1947	34 years, 63 days	Arena Coliseo, Mexico City, Mexico	
195	Win	146–40–7 (2)	Vicente Villavicencio	PTS	10	Jun 28, 1947	34 years, 7 days	Arena Coliseo, Mexico City, Mexico	
194	Loss	145–40–7 (2)	Vicente Villavicencio	TKO	8 (12)	Mar 19, 1947	33 years, 271 days	Arena Coliseo, Mexico City, Mexico	For vacant Mexico middleweight title
193	Win	145–39–7 (2)	Fritzie Zivic	KO	5 (10)	Feb 1, 1947	33 years, 225 days	Mexico City, Mexico	
192	Win	144–39–7 (2)	Cosby Linson	KO	4 (10)	Nov 9, 1946	33 years, 141 days	Arena Coliseo, Mexico City, Mexico	
191	Loss	143–39–7 (2)	Cosby Linson	SD	10	Oct 2, 1946	33 years, 103 days	Plaza de Toros, Ciudad Juarez, Mexico	
190	Win	143–38–7 (2)	Carlos Malacara	TKO	4 (10)	Sep 7, 1946	33 years, 78 days	Arena Coliseo, Mexico City, Mexico	
189	Win	142–38–7 (2)	Lige Drew	PTS	10	Aug 13, 1946	33 years, 53 days	Ciudad Juarez, Mexico	
188	Win	141–38–7 (2)	Joe Keyes	KO	4 (10)	Jul 13, 1946	33 years, 22 days	Mexico City, Mexico	
187	Win	140–38–7 (2)	Lige Drew	KO	8 (10)	Jul 3, 1946	33 years, 12 days	Ciudad Juarez, Mexico	
186	Win	139–38–7 (2)	Baby Zavala	KO	2 (10)	Jun 15, 1946	32 years, 359 days	Arena Coliseo, Mexico City, Mexico	
185	Loss	138–38–7 (2)	Joe Legon	PTS	10	May 11, 1946	32 years, 324 days	Palacio de Deportes, Havana, Cuba	
184	Win	138–37–7 (2)	Kid Filipino	KO	4 (10)	Apr 17, 1946	32 years, 300 days	Palacio de los Deportes, Gomez Palacio, Mexico	
183	Win	137–37–7 (2)	Melvin Johnson	KO	7 (10)	Apr 6, 1946	32 years, 289 days	Mexico City, Mexico	
182	Win	136–37–7 (2)	Joe Legon	KO	3 (10)	Mar 23, 1946	32 years, 275 days	Arena Coliseo, Mexico City, Mexico	
181	Win	135–37–7 (2)	Howell Steen	UD	10	Feb 12, 1946	32 years, 236 days	Municipal Auditorium, San Antonio, Texas, US	
180	Win	134–37–7 (2)	Frankie Vallejo	KO	5 (10)	Feb 7, 1946	32 years, 231 days	Acapulco, Mexico	
179	Win	133–37–7 (2)	Kid Filipino	KO	8 (12)	Jan 12, 1946	32 years, 205 days	Arena Coliseo, Mexico City, Mexico	Retained Mexico welterweight title
178	Win	132–37–7 (2)	Baby Zavala	KO	9 (10)	Nov 11, 1945	32 years, 143 days	Mexico City, Mexico	
177	Win	131–37–7 (2)	Baby Orizaba	KO	3 (10)	Oct 24, 1945	32 years, 125 days	Orizaba, Mexico	
176	Win	130–37–7 (2)	Artie Dorrell	SD	10	Oct 9, 1945	32 years, 110 days	Municipal Auditorium, San Antonio, Texas, US	
175	Win	129–37–7 (2)	Paul Altman	KO	5 (10)	Jul 21, 1945	32 years, 30 days	Arena Coliseo, Mexico City, Mexico	
174	Loss	128–37–7 (2)	Paul Altman	SD	10	Jun 18, 1945	31 years, 362 days	City Auditorium, Houston, Texas, US	
173	Win	128–36–7 (2)	Benny Williams	PTS	10	May 26, 1945	31 years, 339 days	Mexico City, Mexico	
172	Loss	127–36–7 (2)	Fritzie Zivic	MD	10	May 7, 1945	31 years, 320 days	Municipal Auditorium, San Antonio, Texas, US	
171	Win	127–35–7 (2)	Eddie Cerda	KO	6 (10)	Mar 25, 1945	31 years, 277 days	Municipal Auditorium, San Antonio, Texas, US	
170	Win	126–35–7 (2)	Rodolfo Ramirez	TKO	10 (12)	Jan 13, 1945	31 years, 206 days	Municipal Auditorium, San Antonio, Texas, US	Retained Mexico welterweight title
169	Loss	125–35–7 (2)	Fritzie Zivic	MD	10	Dec 12, 1944	31 years, 174 days	Municipal Auditorium, San Antonio, Texas, US	
168	Win	125–34–7 (2)	Paul Altman	PTS	10	Nov 28, 1944	31 years, 160 days	Municipal Auditorium, San Antonio, Texas, US	
167	Win	124–34–7 (2)	Chino Rodriguez	KO	6 (10)	Nov 18, 1944	31 years, 150 days	Arena Coliseo, Mexico City, Mexico	
166	Loss	123–34–7 (2)	Ceferino Garcia	PTS	10	Oct 6, 1944	31 years, 107 days	Arena Coliseo, Mexico City, Mexico	
165	Loss	123–33–7 (2)	Atilio Caraune	KO	11 (12)	Apr 15, 1944	30 years, 299 days	Estadio Luna Park, Buenos Aires, Argentina	
164	Loss	123–32–7 (2)	Raúl Rodríguez	PTS	12	Dec 1, 1943	30 years, 163 days	Buenos Aires, Argentina	
163	Loss	123–31–7 (2)	Amelio Piceda	PTS	12	Jul 3, 1943	30 years, 12 days	Estadio Luna Park, Buenos Aires, Argentina	
162	Loss	123–30–7 (2)	Guillermo Lopez	PTS	10	Jun 20, 1943	29 years, 364 days	Estadio Luna Park, Buenos Aires, Argentina	
161	Win	123–29–7 (2)	Alfredo Pastoriza	PTS	10	Apr 25, 1943	29 years, 308 days	Buenos Aires, Argentina	
160	Win	122–29–7 (2)	Sebastian Romanos	TKO	9 (10)	Apr 11, 1943	29 years, 294 days	La Plata, Argentina	
159	Win	121–29–7 (2)	Rodolfo Ramirez	PTS	12	Jan 16, 1943	29 years, 209 days	Arena Nacional, Mexico City, Mexico	Retained Mexico welterweight title
158	Loss	120–29–7 (2)	Baby Zavala	PTS	4	Dec 19, 1942	29 years, 181 days	Arena Nacional, Mexico City, Mexico	
157	Win	120–28–7 (2)	Ramiro Orejitas Almagro	PTS	10	Oct 17, 1942	29 years, 118 days	Merida, Mexico	
156	Loss	119–28–7 (2)	Joe Legon	PTS	10	Sep 26, 1942	29 years, 97 days	Arena Cristal, Havana, Cuba	
155	Win	119–27–7 (2)	Battling Kid Ambrosio	KO	4 (10)	Jun 26, 1942	29 years, 5 days	Club Tropical, Colon City, Panama	
154	Loss	118–27–7 (2)	Raul Carabantes	PTS	10	May 24, 1942	28 years, 337 days	Gimnasio Nacional, Panama City, Panama	
153	Loss	118–26–7 (2)	Fabio Hurtado	PTS	10	May 10, 1942	28 years, 323 days	Estadio Olimpico, Panama City, Panama	
152	Win	118–25–7 (2)	Ramiro Orejitas Almagro	KO	4 (10)	Mar 8, 1942	28 years, 260 days	Coliseo Olímpico, Guadalajara, Mexico	
151	Win	117–25–7 (2)	Tony Mar	PTS	10	Feb 28, 1942	28 years, 252 days	Arena Nacional, Mexico City, Mexico	
150	Win	116–25–7 (2)	Manuel Villa II	PTS	10	Feb 14, 1942	28 years, 238 days	Arena Nacional, Mexico City, Mexico	
149	Loss	115–25–7 (2)	California Jackie Wilson	TKO	6 (10), 2:00	Oct 24, 1941	28 years, 125 days	Legion Stadium, Hollywood, California, US	
148	Loss	115–24–7 (2)	Rodolfo Ramirez	PTS	10	Jun 7, 1941	27 years, 351 days	Arena Nacional, Mexico City, Mexico	
147	Win	115–23–7 (2)	Raul Carabantes	PTS	10	Feb 15, 1941	27 years, 239 days	Arena Nacional, Mexico City, Mexico	
146	NC	114–23–7 (2)	Herbert Lewis Hardwick	NC	10	Jan 11, 1941	27 years, 204 days	Arena Nacional, Mexico City, Mexico	Distrito Federal boxing commission changed result from an Azteca win
145	Win	114–23–7 (1)	Herbert Lewis Hardwick	PTS	10	Jan 1, 1941	27 years, 194 days	Arena Nacional, Mexico City, Mexico	
144	Draw	113–23–7 (1)	Bobby Pacho	PTS	10	Dec 13, 1940	27 years, 175 days	Municipal Auditorium, San Antonio, Texas, US	
143	Win	113–23–6 (1)	Casanovita de Ahome	KO	5 (10)	Oct 14, 1940	27 years, 115 days	Mexico City, Mexico	
142	Win	112–23–6 (1)	Benny Britt	KO	1 (10)	Sep 22, 1940	27 years, 93 days	Plaza de Toros, Nuevo Laredo, Mexico	
141	Win	111–23–6 (1)	Manuel Villa I	KO	7 (12)	Sep 10, 1940	27 years, 81 days	Plaza de Toros, Nuevo Laredo, Mexico	Retained Mexico welterweight title
140	Win	110–23–6 (1)	Manuel Villa I	KO	5 (12)	Sep 4, 1940	27 years, 75 days	Arena La Cancha, Torreon, Mexico	Retained Mexico welterweight title
139	Win	109–23–6 (1)	Pedro Ortega	KO	4 (10)	Jun 8, 1940	26 years, 352 days	Mexico City, Mexico	
138	Loss	108–23–6 (1)	Pedro Ortega	PTS	10	Apr 27, 1940	26 years, 311 days	Arena Mexico, Mexico City, Mexico	
137	Loss	108–22–6 (1)	Willie Neyland	PTS	10	Apr 6, 1940	26 years, 290 days	Arena Mexico, Mexico City, Mexico	
136	Win	108–21–6 (1)	Jackie Taylor	KO	3 (10)	Mar 11, 1940	26 years, 264 days	Walkathon Arena, San Antonio, Texas, US	
135	Win	107–21–6 (1)	Cuban Luis	KO	4 (10)	Mar 2, 1940	26 years, 255 days	Xalapa, Mexico	
134	Win	106–21–6 (1)	Carlos Malacara	PTS	10	Feb 17, 1940	26 years, 241 days	Arena Nacional, Mexico City, Mexico	
133	Win	105–21–6 (1)	Kid Hermosillo	PTS	12	Nov 25, 1939	26 years, 157 days	Arena Mexico, Mexico City, Mexico	Retained Mexico welterweight title
132	Win	104–21–6 (1)	Cuban Luis	TKO	2 (10)	Nov 18, 1939	26 years, 150 days	Arena Progreso, Guadalajara, Mexico	
131	Loss	103–21–6 (1)	Fritzie Zivic	UD	10	Oct 24, 1939	26 years, 125 days	Olympiad Arena, Houston, Texas, US	
130	Win	103–20–6 (1)	Cuban Luis	KO	4 (10)	Sep 17, 1939	26 years, 88 days	Plaza de Toros, Nuevo Laredo, Mexico	
129	Win	102–20–6 (1)	Kid Hermosillo	PTS	10	Jul 22, 1939	26 years, 31 days	Arena Mexico, Mexico City, Mexico	
128	Win	101–20–6 (1)	Manuel Villa I	KO	5 (12)	Jun 10, 1939	25 years, 354 days	Arena Nacional, Mexico City, Mexico	Retained Mexico welterweight title
127	Loss	100–20–6 (1)	Leon Zorrita	PTS	10	May 23, 1939	25 years, 336 days	Ciudad Juarez, Mexico	
126	Win	100–19–6 (1)	Eddie Cerda	KO	5 (10)	Mar 18, 1939	25 years, 270 days	Arena Mexico, Mexico City, Mexico	
125	Win	99–19–6 (1)	Eddie McGeever	KO	8 (15), 1:41	Feb 3, 1939	25 years, 227 days	Walkathon Arena, San Antonio, Texas, US	Won USA Texas State welterweight title
124	Win	98–19–6 (1)	Bill McDowell	PTS	10	Jan 30, 1939	25 years, 223 days	40 & 8 Arena, Corpus Christi, Texas, US	
123	Win	97–19–6 (1)	Eddie McGeever	PTS	10	Jan 20, 1939	25 years, 213 days	Municipal Auditorium, San Antonio, Texas, US	
122	Win	96–19–6 (1)	Kenny LaSalle	UD	10	Dec 16, 1938	25 years, 178 days	Walkathon Arena, San Antonio, Texas, US	
121	Win	95–19–6 (1)	Jimmy Scaramozi	KO	2 (10)	Dec 11, 1938	25 years, 173 days	Plaza de Toros, Nuevo Laredo, Mexico	
120	Win	94–19–6 (1)	Billy Deeg	PTS	10	Nov 28, 1938	25 years, 160 days	Walkathon Arena, San Antonio, Texas, US	
119	Win	93–19–6 (1)	Bill McDowell	KO	7 (10)	Nov 14, 1938	25 years, 146 days	High School Stadium, Laredo, Texas, US	
118	Win	92–19–6 (1)	Baby La Paz	PTS	10	Oct 29, 1938	25 years, 130 days	El Toreo de Cuatro Caminos, Mexico City, Mexico	
117	Loss	91–19–6 (1)	Kid Hermosillo	PTS	10	Sep 17, 1938	25 years, 88 days	Mexico City, Mexico	
116	Loss	91–18–6 (1)	Bill McDowell	PTS	10	Aug 24, 1938	25 years, 64 days	40 & 8 Arena, Corpus Christi, Texas, US	
115	Win	91–17–6 (1)	Tracy Cox	PTS	10	Aug 17, 1938	25 years, 57 days	40 & 8 Arena, Corpus Christi, Texas, US	
114	Loss	90–17–6 (1)	Saverio Turiello	PTS	10	Mar 8, 1938	24 years, 260 days	Olympiad Arena, Houston, Texas, US	
113	Win	90–16–6 (1)	Saverio Turiello	PTS	10	Jan 1, 1938	24 years, 194 days	El Toreo de Cuatro Caminos, Mexico City, Mexico	
112	Win	89–16–6 (1)	Pee Wee Jarrell	KO	2 (10)	Sep 25, 1937	24 years, 96 days	Arena Mexico, Mexico City, Mexico	
111	Win	88–16–6 (1)	Mario Ramon	KO	5 (10)	Aug 28, 1937	24 years, 68 days	Arena Mexico, Mexico City, Mexico	
110	Win	87–16–6 (1)	Manuel Villa I	KO	5 (10)	Aug 21, 1937	24 years, 61 days	Arena Cine Ideal, Guadalajara, Mexico	
109	Win	86–16–6 (1)	Willard Brown	PTS	10	Jun 18, 1937	23 years, 362 days	Plaza de Toros, Nuevo Laredo, Mexico	
108	Win	85–16–6 (1)	Roy Calamari	KO	3 (10)	Jun 15, 1937	23 years, 359 days	Olympiad Arena, Houston, Texas, US	
107	Win	84–16–6 (1)	Jack Etheridge	KO	2 (10)	May 28, 1937	23 years, 341 days	Plaza de Toros, Nuevo Laredo, Mexico	
106	Win	83–16–6 (1)	Kenny LaSalle	PTS	10	May 18, 1937	23 years, 331 days	Olympiad Arena, Houston, Texas, US	
105	Win	82–16–6 (1)	Midget Mexico	TKO	4 (10)	May 14, 1937	23 years, 327 days	Plaza de Toros, Nuevo Laredo, Mexico	
104	Win	81–16–6 (1)	Ventura Arana	KO	2 (10)	Apr 28, 1937	23 years, 311 days	Monterrey, Mexico	
103	Win	80–16–6 (1)	Eddie Cerda	PTS	10	Mar 3, 1937	23 years, 255 days	Merida, Mexico	
102	Win	79–16–6 (1)	Gallito Ramirez	KO	9 (10)	Feb 14, 1937	23 years, 238 days	Merida, Mexico	
101	Win	78–16–6 (1)	Al Manfredo	PTS	10	Jan 1, 1937	23 years, 194 days	El Toreo de Cuatro Caminos, Mexico City, Mexico	
100	Win	77–16–6 (1)	Tracy Cox	PTS	10	Dec 14, 1936	23 years, 176 days	Municipal Auditorium, San Antonio, Texas, US	
99	Win	76–16–6 (1)	Manuel Villa I	PTS	12	Nov 7, 1936	23 years, 139 days	Arena Nacional, Mexico City, Mexico	Retained Mexico welterweight title
98	Win	75–16–6 (1)	Kid Hermosillo	KO	9 (10)	Aug 8, 1936	23 years, 48 days	Hermosillo, Mexico	
97	Loss	74–16–6 (1)	Ceferino Garcia	KO	5 (10), 1:17	Jul 17, 1936	23 years, 26 days	Legion Stadium, Hollywood, California, US	
96	Loss	74–15–6 (1)	Rodolfo Casanova	PTS	10	May 16, 1936	22 years, 330 days	Arena Nacional, Mexico City, Mexico	
95	Win	74–14–6 (1)	Pepe Saldana	PTS	10	Apr 7, 1936	22 years, 291 days	Tampico, Mexico	
94	Win	73–14–6 (1)	German Rico	PTS	10	Mar 29, 1936	22 years, 282 days	Tampico, Mexico	
93	Win	72–14–6 (1)	Eddie Cerda	PTS	12	Mar 14, 1936	22 years, 267 days	Arena Nacional, Mexico City, Mexico	Won vacant Mexico welterweight title
92	Win	71–14–6 (1)	Pancho Lawler	PTS	10	Jan 3, 1936	22 years, 196 days	Pachuca, Mexico	
91	Win	70–14–6 (1)	Chief Parris	PTS	10	Nov 23, 1935	22 years, 155 days	Arena Nacional, Mexico City, Mexico	
90	Win	69–14–6 (1)	Tommy Collins	KO	7 (10)	Sep 6, 1935	22 years, 77 days	American Legion Arena, Harlingen, Texas, US	
89	Loss	68–14–6 (1)	Chief Parris	PTS	10	Sep 3, 1935	22 years, 74 days	Guest Arena, Houston, Texas, US	
88	Win	68–13–6 (1)	Chief Parris	PTS	10	Aug 30, 1935	22 years, 70 days	Plaza de Toros, Nuevo Laredo, Mexico	
87	Win	67–13–6 (1)	Al Chavez	KO	2 (10)	Jul 4, 1935	22 years, 13 days	Merida, Mexico	
86	Win	66–13–6 (1)	Renato Torres	KO	3 (10)	Jun 12, 1935	21 years, 356 days	Guatemala City, Guatemala	
85	Loss	65–13–6 (1)	Bep van Klaveren	PTS	10	May 24, 1935	21 years, 337 days	Legion Stadium, Hollywood, California, US	
84	Win	65–12–6 (1)	Morrie Sherman	PTS	10	Apr 6, 1935	21 years, 289 days	Arena Nacional, Mexico City, Mexico	
83	Win	64–12–6 (1)	Izzy Jannazzo	PTS	10	Mar 2, 1935	21 years, 254 days	Arena Nacional, Mexico City, Mexico	
82	Win	63–12–6 (1)	Herbert Lewis Hardwick	PTS	10	Jan 26, 1935	21 years, 219 days	Arena Nacional, Mexico City, Mexico	
81	Draw	62–12–6 (1)	Herbert Lewis Hardwick	PTS	10	Jan 19, 1935	21 years, 212 days	Arena Nacional, Mexico City, Mexico	
80	Win	62–12–5 (1)	Kenny LaSalle	PTS	10	Nov 10, 1934	21 years, 142 days	Arena Nacional, Mexico City, Mexico	
79	Win	61–12–5 (1)	Kenny LaSalle	PTS	10	Oct 27, 1934	21 years, 128 days	Arena Nacional, Mexico City, Mexico	
78	Win	60–12–5 (1)	Joe King	KO	1 (10)	Sep 29, 1934	21 years, 100 days	Arena Cine Royal, Guadalajara, Mexico	
77	Win	59–12–5 (1)	Eddie Wolfe	PTS	10	Sep 22, 1934	21 years, 93 days	Arena Nacional, Mexico City, Mexico	
76	Win	58–12–5 (1)	Benny Levine	KO	4 (10)	Aug 30, 1934	21 years, 70 days	Arena Nacional, Mexico City, Mexico	
75	Win	57–12–5 (1)	Pat Murphy	KO	5 (10)	Aug 4, 1934	21 years, 44 days	Arena Nacional, Mexico City, Mexico	
74	Win	56–12–5 (1)	Baby Joe Gans	PTS	10	Jul 22, 1934	21 years, 31 days	Arena Nacional, Mexico City, Mexico	
73	Win	55–12–5 (1)	Young Peter Jackson	PTS	10	Jun 5, 1934	20 years, 349 days	Olympic Auditorium, Los Angeles, California, US	
72	Draw	54–12–5 (1)	Ritchie Mack	PTS	10	May 16, 1934	20 years, 329 days	Arena Nacional, Mexico City, Mexico	
71	Loss	54–12–4 (1)	Ritchie Mack	MD	10	Apr 3, 1934	20 years, 286 days	Steer Stadium, Dallas, Texas, US	
70	Win	54–11–4 (1)	Cowboy Eddie Anderson	PTS	10	Mar 15, 1934	20 years, 267 days	Liberty Hall, El Paso, Texas, US	
69	Win	53–11–4 (1)	Ritchie Mack	PTS	10	Mar 10, 1934	20 years, 262 days	Arena Nacional, Mexico City, Mexico	
68	Win	52–11–4 (1)	Bernardo Pena	KO	3 (10)	Feb 20, 1934	20 years, 244 days	Cordova, Mexico	
67	Win	51–11–4 (1)	Manuel Villa I	KO	9 (10)	Feb 17, 1934	20 years, 241 days	Arena Nacional, Mexico City, Mexico	
66	Draw	50–11–4 (1)	Paulie Walker	PTS	10	Dec 2, 1933	20 years, 164 days	Arena Nacional, Mexico City, Mexico	
65	Win	50–11–3 (1)	Al Schaff	TKO	5 (10)	Nov 18, 1933	20 years, 150 days	Arena Nacional, Mexico City, Mexico	
64	Win	49–11–3 (1)	Martin Barbotteux	PTS	10	Nov, 1933	N/A	Monterrey, Mexico	Exact date uncertain
63	Win	48–11–3 (1)	Elias Alvarez	KO	? (10)	Oct 28, 1933	20 years, 129 days	Puebla, Mexico	Exact result uncertain
62	Win	47–11–3 (1)	Leonard Bennett	PTS	10	Oct, 1933	N/A	Arena Nacional, Mexico City, Mexico	Exact date and result uncertain
61	Loss	46–11–3 (1)	Leonard Bennett	DQ	6 (10)	Sep 23, 1933	20 years, 94 days	Arena Nacional, Mexico City, Mexico	
60	Win	46–10–3 (1)	Meyer Grace	KO	4 (10)	Aug 19, 1933	20 years, 59 days	Arena Nacional, Mexico City, Mexico	
59	Win	45–10–3 (1)	Ceferino Garcia	TKO	8 (10)	Jul 25, 1933	20 years, 34 days	Olympic Auditorium, Los Angeles, California, US	
58	Win	44–10–3 (1)	Ceferino Garcia	PTS	10	Jul 11, 1933	20 years, 20 days	Olympic Auditorium, Los Angeles, California, US	
57	Loss	43–10–3 (1)	Eddie Frisco	PTS	10	Jun, 1933	N/A	Merida, Mexico	Exact date uncertain
56	Win	43–9–3 (1)	Relampago Saguero	PTS	10	May 27, 1933	19 years, 340 days	Arena Nacional, Mexico City, Mexico	
55	Win	42–9–3 (1)	Eddie Frisco	PTS	10	May 13, 1933	19 years, 326 days	Arena Nacional, Mexico City, Mexico	
54	Win	41–9–3 (1)	Harry Galfund	KO	2 (10)	Apr 2, 1933	19 years, 285 days	El Toreo de Cuatro Caminos, Mexico City, Mexico	
53	Win	40–9–3 (1)	David Velasco	PTS	10	Mar, 1933	N/A	Tampico, Mexico	Exact date uncertain
52	Win	39–9–3 (1)	Tommy White	PTS	10	Mar 11, 1933	19 years, 263 days	Arena Nacional, Mexico City, Mexico	
51	Win	38–9–3 (1)	Joe Glick	PTS	10	Feb 18, 1933	19 years, 242 days	Arena Nacional, Mexico City, Mexico	
50	Win	37–9–3 (1)	Luis Alvarado	PTS	10	Jan, 1933	N/A	Merida, Mexico	Exact date uncertain
49	Win	36–7–3 (4)	Eddie Cerda	PTS	10	Jan, 1933	N/A	Merida, Mexico	Exact date uncertain
48	Win	35–9–3 (1)	Armando Aguilar	PTS	10	Dec, 1932	N/A	Merida, Mexico	Exact date uncertain
47	Win	34–9–3 (1)	Martin Barbotteux	PTS	10	Nov, 1932	N/A	Arena Nacional, Mexico City, Mexico	Exact date uncertain
46	Win	33–9–3 (1)	David Velasco	PTS	12	Oct 23, 1932	19 years, 124 days	El Toreo de Cuatro Caminos, Mexico City, Mexico	Won vacant Mexico welterweight title
45	Win	32–9–3 (1)	Manuel Luna	KO	6 (10)	Oct 9, 1932	19 years, 110 days	El Toreo de Cuatro Caminos, Mexico City, Mexico	
44	Win	31–9–3 (1)	Loncho Perez	KO	2 (10)	Sep 16, 1932	19 years, 87 days	El Toreo de Cuatro Caminos, Mexico City, Mexico	
43	Win	30–9–3 (1)	Ray Macias	PTS	10	Sep 10, 1932	19 years, 81 days	Arena Nacional, Mexico City, Mexico	
42	Win	29–9–3 (1)	Felipe Orozco	TKO	7 (10)	Aug 28, 1932	19 years, 68 days	Arena Nacional, Mexico City, Mexico	
41	Win	28–9–3 (1)	Luis Portela	KO	9 (10)	Aug 13, 1932	19 years, 53 days	Arena Nacional, Mexico City, Mexico	
40	Loss	27–9–3 (1)	Raúl Talán	PTS	10	Jul 30, 1932	19 years, 39 days	Arena Nacional, Mexico City, Mexico	
39	Win	27–8–3 (1)	Alfredo Gaona	PTS	10	Jul, 1932	N/A	Arena Nacional, Mexico City, Mexico	Exact date and location unknown
38	Loss	26–8–3 (1)	Tommy White	KO	8 (10)	Jun 27, 1932	19 years, 6 days	Arena Nacional, Mexico City, Mexico	
37	Win	26–7–3 (1)	Luis Arizona	DQ	7 (10)	May 28, 1932	18 years, 342 days	Arena Nacional, Mexico City, Mexico	
36	Win	25–7–3 (1)	Carlos Garcia	PTS	10	Mar 23, 1932	18 years, 276 days	Arena Tex Rickard, Nuevo Laredo, Mexico	
35	Win	24–7–3 (1)	Carlos Garcia	PTS	10	Feb 17, 1932	18 years, 241 days	Arena Tex Rickard, Nuevo Laredo, Mexico	
34	Win	23–7–3 (1)	Battling Shaw	PTS	10	Jan 31, 1932	18 years, 224 days	Arena Tex Rickard, Nuevo Laredo, Mexico	
33	NC	22–7–3 (1)	Manuel Cermeno	NC	5 (10)	Jan 28, 1932	18 years, 221 days	Nuevo Leon, Mexico	
32	Win	22–7–3	Paul Wangley	KO	5 (10)	Jan, 1932	N/A	Tulsa, Alabama	Exact date unknown
31	Draw	21–7–3	Armando Aguilar	PTS	10	Dec 20, 1931	18 years, 182 days	Arena Tex Rickard, Nuevo Laredo, Mexico	
30	Win	21–7–2	Antonio Escareno	TKO	6 (10)	Nov 12, 1931	18 years, 144 days	Saltillo, Mexico	
29	Win	20–7–2	Battling Vega	TKO	3 (10)	Oct 26, 1931	18 years, 127 days	Saltillo, Mexico	
28	Loss	19–7–2	Battling Shaw	PTS	10	Oct 18, 1931	18 years, 119 days	Nuevo Laredo, Mexico	
27	Win	19–6–2	Jorge Monzon	TKO	2 (10)	Aug 5, 1931	18 years, 45 days	Nuevo Laredo, Mexico	
26	Win	18–6–2	Bearcat Joe Barrera	KO	3 (8)	Jul 8, 1931	18 years, 17 days	Arena Tex Rickard, Nuevo Laredo, Mexico	
25	Win	17–6–2	Johnson Harper	KO	3 (8)	Jun 24, 1931	18 years, 3 days	Arena Tex Rickard, Nuevo Laredo, Mexico	
24	Win	16–6–2	Chato Flores	KO	6 (8)	May 20, 1931	17 years, 333 days	Arena Tex Rickard, Nuevo Laredo, Mexico	
23	Win	15–6–2	Guero Pena	PTS	8	May 5, 1931	17 years, 318 days	Arena Tex Rickard, Nuevo Laredo, Mexico	
22	Win	14–6–2	Tommy K.O. Mahavier	KO	4 (8)	Apr 26, 1931	17 years, 309 days	Square Garden Ring, Matamoros, Mexico	
21	Win	13–6–2	Bearcat Joe Barrera	PTS	8	Apr 8, 1931	17 years, 291 days	Riverside Square Garden, Nuevo Laredo, Mexico	
20	Win	12–6–2	Newsboy Eddie Lopez	NWS	10	Mar 24, 1931	17 years, 276 days	Beethoven Hall, San Antonio, Texas, US	
19	Draw	11–6–2	Bearcat Joe Barrera	PTS	6	Mar 22, 1931	17 years, 274 days	Plaza de Toros, Nuevo Laredo, Mexico	
18	Win	11–6–1	Kid Chocolate	TKO	? (10)	Feb 18, 1931	17 years, 242 days	Riverside Square Garden, Nuevo Laredo, Mexico	
17	Win	10–6–1	Battling Ward	TKO	5 (10)	Jan 20, 1931	17 years, 213 days	Plaza de Toros, Nuevo Laredo, Mexico	
16	Loss	9–6–1	Brooks Hooper	NWS	10	Jan 13, 1931	17 years, 206 days	Beethoven Hall, San Antonio, Texas, US	
15	Loss	9–5–1	Fausto Velasco	NWS	10	Dec 30, 1930	17 years, 192 days	Beethoven Hall, San Antonio, Texas, US	
14	Win	9–4–1	Fausto Velasco	TKO	3 (10)	Dec 12, 1930	17 years, 174 days	Plaza de Toros, Nuevo Laredo, Mexico	
13	Draw	8–4–1	Kid Chocolate	PTS	6	Nov 5, 1930	17 years, 137 days	Riverside Square Garden, Nuevo Laredo, Mexico	Not to be confused with Kid Chocolate
12	Loss	8–4	Enrique Sada	PTS	6	Oct 1, 1930	17 years, 102 days	Riverside Square Garden, Nuevo Laredo, Mexico	
11	Win	8–3	Texas Kid	KO	1 (6)	Aug 20, 1930	17 years, 60 days	Riverside Square Garden, Nuevo Laredo, Mexico	
10	Win	7–3	Kid Flores	KO	1 (6)	Jul 30, 1930	17 years, 39 days	Riverside Square Garden, Nuevo Laredo, Mexico	
9	Win	6–3	Kid Cortinas	KO	? (6)	Jul 30, 1930	17 years, 39 days	Riverside Square Garden, Nuevo Laredo, Mexico	
8	Loss	5–3	Santos Delgado	PTS	6	Jul 4, 1930	17 years, 13 days	Riverside Square Garden, Nuevo Laredo, Mexico	
7	Win	5–2	Jimmy Harwell	PTS	6	Jun 29, 1930	17 years, 8 days	Plaza de Toros, Nuevo Laredo, Mexico	
6	Win	4–2	Texas Kid	PTS	6	Jun 6, 1930	16 years, 350 days	Escuela Hidalgo Arena, Nuevo Laredo, Mexico	
5	Win	3–2	Jesus Gaitan	PTS	6	May 18, 1930	16 years, 331 days	Plaza de Toros, Nuevo Laredo, Mexico	
4	Win	2–2	Jimmy Harwell	KO	3 (6)	Apr 20, 1930	16 years, 303 days	Plaza de Toros, Nuevo Laredo, Mexico	
3	Win	1–2	Cipriano Castillo	PTS	4	Mar 23, 1930	16 years, 275 days	Plaza de Toros, Nuevo Laredo, Mexico	
2	Loss	0–2	Pancho Aranda	PTS	6	Oct 20, 1929	16 years, 121 days	Plaza de Toros, Nuevo Laredo, Mexico	
1	Loss	0–1	Pancho Aranda	PTS	6	Sep 1, 1929	16 years, 72 days	Salon Montecarlo, Nuevo Laredo, Mexico	

== Success ==
- In 1933, Kid Azteca obtained the Mexican Welterweight title.
- Azteca was still remembered by his fans some twenty years after his last fight, the Spanish boxing publication Ring En Español featuring him many times on magazine articles.
- Azteca had 192 wins, 46 losses and 12 ties as a professional boxer, with 114 knockout wins. His knockouts made him a member of the exclusive group of fighters that won 50 or more fights by knockout through their careers, and it also constituted a knockout record for Hispanic fighters.
