= Battling Shaw =

Mexican boxer (1910–1994)

Personal information
- Nicknames: Battling Shaw; Benny Kid Roy
- Nationality: Mexican
- Born: José Pérez Flores; October 21, 1910 Birthplace disputed between Nuevo Laredo, Tamaulipas, Mexico and Laredo, Texas, United States
- Died: August 27, 1994 (aged 83) Texas, United States
- Height: 5 ft 7 in (1.70 m)
- Weight: Lightweight; Light welterweight Welterweight

Boxing career
- Reach: 68 in (173 cm)
- Stance: Orthodox

Boxing record
- Total fights: 119
- Wins: 79
- Win by KO: 32
- Losses: 29
- Draws: 9
- No contests: 2

José Pérez Flores (October 21, 1910 – August 27, 1994) was a Mexican professional boxer better known as Battling Shaw or Benny Kid Roy. He was the first Mexican to become a world champion, defeating Johnny Jadick in 1933 for the world light welterweight title.

== Professional career ==
Shaw made his pro debut at the age of 16. He mostly fought out of Louisiana. He became the World Light Welterweight Champion after decisioning Johnny Jadick in 1933. He also fought fellow Mexican fighter and hall of fame Kid Azteca, although the exact date is unknown (Herbert Goldman's boxing encyclopedia dates the bouts as taking place in July and August 1931, but without any day numbers given; Shaw lost both bouts on points in ten rounds). He was trained and managed by Emile Bruneau (WBA President '62-66).

== Professional boxing record ==
All information in this section is derived from BoxRec, unless otherwise stated.

=== Official record ===
119 fights	70 wins	28 losses
By knockout	32	7
By decision	35	21
By disqualification	3	0
Draws	9	
No contests	2	
Newspaper decisions/draws	10	

All newspaper decisions are officially regarded as “no decision” bouts and are not counted in the win/loss/draw column.

No.	Result	Record	Opponent	Type	Round	Date	Age	Location	Notes
119	Loss	70–28–9 (12)	David Velasco	PTS	10	Oct 1, 1936	25 years, 346 days	Tampico, Tamaulipas, Mexico	Exact day in Oct unknown
118	Loss	70–27–9 (12)	Pepe Saldana	PTS	10	Apr 19, 1936	25 years, 181 days	Plaza de Toros, Torreon, Coahuila de Zaragoza, Mexico	
117	Loss	70–26–9 (12)	Ritchie Mack	TKO	2 (10)	Nov 27, 1935	25 years, 37 days	Independence Theatre, Nuevo Laredo, Tamaulipas, Mexico	
116	Loss	70–25–9 (12)	Midget Mexico	PTS	10	Jul 4, 1935	24 years, 256 days	Arena Tex Rickard, Nuevo Laredo, Tamaulipas, Mexico	
115	Loss	70–24–9 (12)	Honeyboy Snipes	PTS	10	Sep 10, 1934	23 years, 324 days	Mobile, Alabama, U.S	
114	Loss	70–23–9 (12)	Willard Brown	PTS	10	Jun 25, 1934	23 years, 247 days	American Legion Arena, Mobile, Alabama, U.S	
113	Loss	70–22–9 (12)	Willard Brown	TKO	1 (10)	Jun 11, 1934	23 years, 223 days	Coliseum Arena, New Orleans, Louisiana, U.S	
112	Win	70–21–9 (12)	Jack Blalock	KO	5 (10)	Jun 4, 1934	23 years, 226 days	Mobile, Alabama, U.S	
111	NC	69–21–9 (12)	Jimmy Reed	NC	8 (10)	May 28, 1934	23 years, 219 days	Jacksonville, Florida, U.S	
110	Win	69–21–9 (11)	Jack Blalock	PTS	10	May 7, 1934	23 years, 198 days	Mobile, Alabama, U.S	
109	Win	68–21–9 (11)	Sammy Lucas	KO	6 (10)	Apr 9, 1934	23 years, 190 days	Mobile, Alabama, U.S	
108	Win	67–21–9 (11)	Gene Tillman	NWS	10	Mar 26, 1934	23 years, 156 days	Mobile, Alabama, U.S	
107	Loss	67–21–9 (10)	Young Peter Jackson	TKO	7 (10)	Dec 19, 1933	23 years, 59 days	Olympic Auditorium, Los Angeles, California, U.S	
106	Loss	67–20–9 (10)	Tommy White	PTS	10	Nov 24, 1933	23 years, 34 days	American Legion Arena, Harlingen, Texas, U.S	
105	Loss	67–19–9 (10)	Willard Brown	TKO	4 (10)	Sep 21, 1933	22 years, 335 days	Fair Park Live Stock Arena, Dallas, Texas, U.S	
104	Loss	67–18–9 (10)	Tracy Cox	PTS	10	Sep 6, 1933	22 years, 320 days	Fort McIntosh Bowl, Laredo, Texas, U.S	
103	Win	67–17–9 (10)	Jimmy Murphy	KO	2 (10)	Aug 28, 1933	22 years, 311 days	Arena Tex Rickard, Nuevo Laredo, Tamaulipas, Mexico	
102	Win	66–17–9 (10)	Lou Avery	PTS	10	Aug 14, 1933	22 years, 297 days	Arena Tex Rickard, Nuevo Laredo, Tamaulipas, Mexico	
101	Loss	65–17–9 (10)	Ray Kiser	PTS	10	Jul 31, 1933	22 years, 283 days	Coliseum Arena, New Orleans, Louisiana, U.S.	
100	Loss	65–16–9 (10)	Harry Dublinsky	UD	10	Jul 3, 1933	22 years, 255 days	Coliseum Arena, New Orleans, Louisiana, U.S.	
99	Loss	65–15–9 (10)	Tony Canzoneri	UD	10	May 21, 1933	22 years, 212 days	Heinemann Park, New Orleans, Louisiana, U.S.	Lost world light-welterweight title
98	Win	65–14–9 (10)	Tommy Grogan	PTS	10	Apr 17, 1933	22 years, 178 days	Coliseum Arena, New Orleans, Louisiana, U.S.	
97	Win	64–14–9 (10)	Gabe Chamberlain	KO	5 (10)	Apr 10, 1933	21 years, 172 days	American Legion Arena, Mobile, Alabama, U.S.	
96	Win	62–14–9 (10)	Johnny Jadick	MD	10	Feb 20, 1933	22 years, 122 days	Coliseum Arena, New Orleans, Louisiana, U.S.	Won world light-welterweight title
95	Loss	62–14–9 (10)	Joe Ghnouly	PTS	10	Feb 7, 1933	22 years, 109 days	Arena, Saint Louis, Missouri, U.S.	
94	Loss	62–13–9 (10)	Wesley Ramey	PTS	10	Jan 7, 1933	22 years, 78 days	Arena Nacional, Mexico City, Distrito Federal, Mexico	
93	Win	62–12–9 (10)	Ervin Berlier	UD	10	Dec 19, 1932	22 years, 59 days	Coliseum Arena, New Orleans, Louisiana, U.S.	Won Southern United States lightweight title
92	Win	61–12–9 (10)	Lou Terry	PTS	10	Nov 28, 1932	22 years, 38 days	Coliseum Arena, New Orleans, Louisiana, U.S.	
91	Loss	60–12–9 (10)	Lou Terry	PTS	10	Oct 3, 1932	21 years, 348 days	Coliseum Arena, New Orleans, Louisiana, U.S.	
90	Win	60–11–9 (10)	Joe Ghnouly	PTS	10	Aug 29, 1932	21 years, 313 days	Coliseum Arena, New Orleans, Louisiana, U.S.	
89	Win	59–11–9 (10)	Ray Kiser	PTS	10	Aug 15, 1932	21 years, 299 days	Coliseum Arena, New Orleans, Louisiana, U.S.	
88	Loss	58–11–9 (10)	Davey Abad	PTS	10	Jul 25, 1932	21 years, 278 days	Coliseum Arena, New Orleans, Louisiana, U.S.	
87	Win	58–10–9 (10)	Joe Ghnouly	KO	9 (10)	Jul 11, 1932	21 years, 264 days	Coliseum Arena, New Orleans, Louisiana, U.S.	
86	Win	57–10–9 (10)	Johnny Cook	PTS	10	Jun 13, 1932	21 years, 236 days	Coliseum Arena, New Orleans, Louisiana, U.S.	
85	Win	56–10–9 (10)	Davey Abad	UD	10	Jun 6, 1932	21 years, 229 days	Coliseum Arena, New Orleans, Louisiana, U.S.	
84	Win	55–10–9 (10)	Matty Brock	TKO	9 (10)	May 23, 1932	21 years, 215 days	Coliseum Arena, New Orleans, Louisiana, U.S.	
83	Win	54–10–9 (10)	Ervin Berlier	TKO	8 (10)	Apr 18, 1932	21 years, 180 days	Coliseum Arena, New Orleans, Louisiana, U.S.	
82	Win	53–10–9 (10)	Lou Avery	PTS	10	Mar 7, 1932	21 years, 138 days	Coliseum Arena, New Orleans, Louisiana, U.S.	
81	Loss	52–10–9 (10)	Ray Kiser	PTS	10	Feb 22, 1932	21 years, 124 days	Coliseum Arena, New Orleans, Louisiana, U.S.	
80	Loss	52–9–9 (10)	Kid Azteca	PTS	10	Jan 31, 1932	21 years, 102 days	Arena Tex Rickard, Nuevo Laredo, Tamaulipas, Mexico	
79	Win	52–8–9 (10)	Carlos Garcia	PTS	10	Jan 16, 1932	21 years, 87 days	Arena Nacional, Mexico City, Distrito Federal, Mexico	
78	Win	51–8–9 (10)	Luis Portela	TKO	5 (10)	Jan 1, 1932	21 years, 72 days	El Toreo de Cuatro Caminos, Mexico City, Distrito Federal, Mexico	
77	Draw	50–8–9 (10)	Luis Arizona	PTS	10	Dec 26, 1931	21 years, 66 days	Arena Nacional, Mexico City, Distrito Federal, Mexico	
76	Loss	50–8–8 (10)	Howard Scott	KO	2 (10)	Oct 25, 1931	21 years, 4 days	Arena Tex Rickard, Nuevo Laredo, Tamaulipas, Mexico	
75	Win	50–7–8 (10)	Kid Azteca	PTS	10	Oct 18, 1931	20 years, 362 days	Monterrey, Nuevo León, Mexico	
74	Loss	49–7–8 (10)	Bulldog Gonzalez	PTS	10	Oct 3, 1931	20 years, 347 days	Arena Nacional, Mexico City, Distrito Federal, Mexico	
73	Win	49–6–8 (10)	Marcial Zavala	TKO	5 (10)	Sep 26, 1931	20 years, 340 days	Mexico City, Distrito Federal, Mexico	
72	Loss	48–6–8 (10)	Manuel Villa I	PTS	10	Sep 12, 1931	20 years, 326 days	Arena Nacional, Mexico City, Distrito Federal, Mexico	
71	Win	48–5–8 (10)	Kid Pancho	DQ	7 (10)	Aug 29, 1931	20 years, 312 days	Arena Nacional, Mexico City, Distrito Federal, Mexico	
70	Win	47–5–8 (10)	Pedro Ortega	PTS	10	Aug 22, 1931	20 years, 305 days	Arena Nacional, Mexico City, Distrito Federal, Mexico	
69	Draw	46–5–8 (10)	Pablo Alejandro	PTS	10	Aug 1, 1931	20 years, 284 days	Arena Nacional, Mexico City, Distrito Federal, Mexico	
68	Win	46–5–7 (10)	Pablo Alejandro	PTS	10	Jul 18, 1931	20 years, 270 days	Monterrey, Nuevo León, Mexico	
67	Win	45–5–7 (10)	Bobby Cohen	KO	4 (10)	Jul 8, 1931	20 years, 260 days	Arena Tex Rickard, Nuevo Laredo, Tamaulipas, Mexico	
66	Win	44–5–7 (10)	Carlos Garcia	PTS	12	Jun 24, 1931	20 years, 246 days	Arena Tex Rickard, Nuevo Laredo, Tamaulipas, Mexico	
65	Win	43–5–7 (10)	Ray Kiser	PTS	10	May 27, 1931	20 years, 218 days	Arena Tex Rickard, Nuevo Laredo, Tamaulipas, Mexico	
64	Win	42–5–7 (10)	Dutch Crozier	KO	4 (10)	May 5, 1931	20 years, 196 days	Arena Tex Rickard, Nuevo Laredo, Tamaulipas, Mexico	
63	Win	41–5–7 (10)	Tommy Nelson	KO	2 (10)	Apr 8, 1931	20 years, 169 days	Riverside Square Garden, Nuevo Laredo, Tamaulipas, Mexico	
62	Loss	40–5–7 (10)	Baby Arizmendi	PTS	10	Feb 28, 1931	20 years, 130 days	Laredo, Texas, U.S.	
61	Win	40–4–7 (10)	Loncho Perez	KO	? (10)	Dec 17, 1930	20 years, 57 days	Riverside Square Garden, Nuevo Laredo, Tamaulipas, Mexico	
60	Draw	39–4–7 (10)	Wildcat Monte	PTS	10	Nov 26, 1930	20 years, 36 days	Riverside Square Garden, Nuevo Laredo, Tamaulipas, Mexico	
59	Win	39–4–6 (10)	Kenneth Johnson	DQ	1 (6)	Nov 21, 1930	20 years, 31 days	Imperial Valley A.C., El Centro, California, U.S.	Johnson landed a low blow near the end of the round
58	Loss	38–4–6 (10)	Johnny Martinez	PTS	4	Nov 1, 1930	20 years, 11 days	Main Street Athletic Club, Los Angeles, California, U.S.	
57	Win	38–3–6 (10)	Frankie Diaz	TKO	5 (6)	Oct 28, 1930	20 years, 7 days	Olympic Auditorium, Los Angeles, California, U.S.	
56	Win	37–3–6 (10)	Trench King	KO	1 (10)	Oct 1, 1930	19 years, 345 days	Ocean Park Arena, Santa Monica, California, U.S.	
55	Win	36–3–6 (10)	Don Smith	TKO	4 (8)	Sep 25, 1930	19 years, 339 days	Legion Stadium, South Gate, California, U.S.	
54	Win	35–3–6 (10)	Johnny Miceli	KO	? (8)	Sep 18, 1930	19 years, 332 days	Legion Stadium, South Gate, California, U.S.	
53	Win	34–3–6 (10)	Lew Tital	TKO	3 (8)	Sep 4, 1930	19 years, 318 days	Legion Stadium, South Gate, California, U.S.	
52	Loss	33–3–6 (10)	Johnny Kid Blair	PTS	4	Aug 27, 1930	19 years, 188 days	Ontario A.C., Ontario, California, U.S.	
51	Draw	33–2–6 (10)	Rita Punay	PTS	10	Aug 20, 1930	19 years, 303 days	Ocean Park Arena, Santa Monica, California, U.S.	
50	Win	33–2–5 (10)	Johnny Moreno	PTS	10	Jul 6, 1930	19 years, 228 days	Rio Rico, Texas, U.S.	
49	Loss	32–2–5 (10)	Carlos Garcia	KO	3 (10)	Jul 4, 1930	19 years, 256 days	Riverside Square Garden, Nuevo Laredo, Tamaulipas, Mexico	
48	Draw	32–1–5 (10)	KO Castillo	PTS	10	Jun 8, 1930	19 years, 230 days	Plaza de Toros, Nuevo Laredo, Tamaulipas, Mexico	
47	Win	32–1–4 (10)	Carlos Garcia	PTS	10	May 18, 1930	19 years, 209 days	Plaza de Toros, Nuevo Laredo, Tamaulipas, Mexico	
46	Win	31–1–4 (10)	Jack Rich	KO	2 (10)	May 4, 1930	19 years, 195 days	Plaza de Toros, Nuevo Laredo, Tamaulipas, Mexico	
45	Win	30–1–4 (10)	Jack Colbert	PTS	10	Apr 20, 1930	19 years, 181 days	Plaza de Toros, Nuevo Laredo, Tamaulipas, Mexico	
44	Win	29–1–4 (10)	Ted Miranda	PTS	10	Aug 22, 1929	18 years, 305 days	Bay City, Michigan, U.S.	
43	Win	28–1–4 (10)	Ted Miranda	PTS	10	Aug 15, 1929	18 years, 298 days	Clare, Michigan, U.S.	
42	Win	27–1–4 (10)	Ted Miranda	PTS	6	Aug 9, 1929	18 years, 292 days	Clare, Michigan, U.S.	
41	Win	26–1–4 (10)	Ted Miranda	PTS	6	Aug 1, 1929	18 years, 284 days	Charlevoix, Michigan, U.S.	
40	Win	25–1–4 (10)	Kid Ruiz	KO	5 (10)	Jul 6, 1929	18 years, 258 days	Nuevo Laredo, Tamaulipas, Mexico	
39	Win	24–1–4 (10)	Johnny Hughes	PTS	10	May 27, 1929	18 years, 218 days	Robinson's Arena, Mercedes, Texas, U.S.	
38	Win	23–1–4 (10)	Kid Ruiz	KO	8 (10)	May 14, 1929	18 years, 205 days	Robinson's Arena, Mercedes, Texas, U.S.	
37	Draw	22–1–4 (10)	Brooks Hooper	PTS	10	Apr 29, 1929	18 years, 190 days	Robinson's Arena, Mercedes, Texas, U.S.	
36	Win	22–1–3 (10)	Kid Brooks	PTS	10	Apr 22, 1929	18 years, 183 days	Bartlesville, Oklahoma, U.S.	
35	Win	21–1–3 (10)	Kid Ruiz	DQ	6 (10)	Apr 1, 1929	18 years, 162 days	Robinson's Arena, Mercedes, Texas, U.S.	Ruiz was disqualified for hitting low
34	Draw	20–1–3 (10)	Wildcat Monte	PTS	10	Mar 18, 1929	18 years, 148 days	Mercedes, Texas, U.S.	Exact date in March unknown
33	Draw	20–1–2 (10)	Kid Pancho	PTS	10	Mar 4, 1929	18 years, 134 days	Ohio Av. Arena, Mercedes, Texas, U.S.	
32	Win	20–1–1 (10)	Dick Wymore	PTS	10	Feb 25, 1929	18 years, 127 days	Fort Brown Skating Rink, Brownsville, Texas, U.S.	
31	Win	19–1–1 (10)	Ken Macey	PTS	8	Feb 18, 1929	18 years, 120 days	Mercedes, Texas, U.S.	
30	Win	18–1–1 (10)	Kid Pancho	KO	9 (10)	Feb 1, 1929	18 years, 103 days	Texas, U.S.	Precise date of bout unknown at this time
29	Win	17–1–1 (10)	Ken Macey	PTS	10	Dec 12, 1928	18 years, 52 days	Texas, U.S.	Precise date of bout unknown at this time
28	Win	16–1–1 (10)	Mickey Cromwell	KO	6 (6)	Oct 24, 1928	18 years, 3 days	Kelly Field Stadium, San Antonio, Texas, U.S.	
27	Win	15–1–1 (10)	Pablo Alejandro	NWS	6	Oct 23, 1928	18 years, 2 days	Jack Shelton Arena, San Antonio, Texas, U.S.	
26	Loss	15–1–1 (9)	Al Kober	TKO	6 (10)	Oct 11, 1928	17 years, 356 days	Fort McIntosh Bowl, Laredo, Texas, U.S.	
25	Win	15–0–1 (9)	Sailor Barrera	PTS	10	Jul 6, 1928	17 years, 259 days	Laredo, Texas, U.S.	
24	Win	14–0–1 (9)	Joe Malavanos	KO	5 (?)	Jul 1, 1928	17 years, 254 days	Texas, U.S.	Precise date of bout unknown at this time
23	Win	13–0–1 (9)	Kid Torreon	KO	4 (8)	Jun 13, 1928	17 years, 236 days	Mercedes, Texas, U.S.	
22	Win	12–0–1 (9)	Juan Hernandez	PTS	6	Jun 10, 1928	17 years, 233 days	Texas, U.S.	Precise date of bout unknown at this time
21	NC	11–0–1 (9)	Jesse Sada	NC	6 (8)	Jun 7, 1928	17 years, 230 days	Fort McIntosh Bowl, Laredo, Texas, U.S.	The fight was halted as neither fighter seemed to giving his best
20	Win	11–0–1 (8)	Dick Wymore	TKO	9 (10)	May 7, 1928	17 years, 199 days	Ohio Av. Arena, Mercedes, Texas, U.S.	
19	Win	10–0–1 (8)	Joe Montana	PTS	10	Apr 16, 1928	17 years, 178 days	Mercedes, Texas, U.S.	
18	Win	9–0–1 (8)	George Marcus	TKO	4 (6)	Feb 28, 1928	17 years, 130 days	Business Men's A.C., San Antonio, Texas, U.S.	
17	Draw	8–0–1 (8)	Dick Wymore	PTS	10	Feb 27, 1928	17 years, 129 days	Mercedes, Texas, U.S.	
16	Win	8–0 (8)	Newsboy Reyes	NWS	6	Feb 14, 1928	17 years, 116 days	Business Men's A.C., San Antonio, Texas, U.S.	
15	Win	8–0 (7)	Newsboy Reyes	NWS	6	Feb 7, 1928	17 years, 109 days	Business Men's A.C., San Antonio, Texas, U.S.	
14	Win	8–0 (6)	Terry Young	TKO	2 (6)	Jan 31, 1928	17 years, 102 days	Business Men's A.C., San Antonio, Texas, U.S.	
13	Win	7–0 (6)	Kid George	NWS	4	Jan 27, 1928	17 years, 98 days	Aurora A.C. Gym, San Antonio, Texas, U.S.	
12	Win	7–0 (5)	Joe Montana	TKO	7 (8)	Dec 23, 1927	17 years, 63 days	Fort McIntosh Theatre, Laredo, Texas, U.S.	
11	Win	6–0 (5)	Jesse Sada	TKO	5 (8)	Nov 11, 1927	17 years, 21 days	Fort McIntosh Bowl, Laredo, Texas, U.S.	
10	Win	5–0 (5)	Bill Cody	KO	1 (8)	Oct 27, 1927	17 years, 6 days	Fort McIntosh Bowl, Laredo, Texas, U.S.	
9	Win	4–0 (5)	Kid Monterrey	PTS	8	Oct 20, 1927	16 years, 364 days	Fort McIntosh Bowl, Laredo, Texas, U.S.	
8	Win	3–0 (5)	Kid Torreon	PTS	8	Oct 13, 1927	16 years, 357 days	Fort McIntosh Bowl, Laredo, Texas, U.S.	
7	Win	2–0 (5)	Kid George	NWS	6	Sep 27, 1927	16 years, 341 days	Soledad Roof, San Antonio, Texas, U.S.	
6	Win	2–0 (4)	Terry Young	NWS	6	Sep 20, 1927	16 years, 334 days	Soledad Roof, San Antonio, Texas, U.S.	
5	Win	2–0 (3)	Kid George	NWS	6	Aug 30, 1927	16 years, 313 days	Soledad Roof, San Antonio, Texas, U.S.	
4	Win	2–0 (2)	Kid George	PTS	6	Aug 19, 1927	16 years, 302 days	Fort McIntosh Bowl, Laredo, Texas, U.S.	
3	Win	1–0 (2)	Young Pancho	KO	2 (4)	Jul 28, 1927	16 years, 280 days	Fort McIntosh Bowl, Laredo, Texas, U.S.	
2	Win	0–0 (2)	Terry Young	NWS	4	Jul 12, 1927	16 years, 264 days	Soledad Roof, San Antonio, Texas, U.S.	
1	Loss	0–0 (1)	Brooks Hooper	NWS	4	Jun 28, 1927	16 years, 250 days	Soledad Roof, San Antonio, Texas, U.S.	

=== Unofficial record ===
119 fights	79 wins	29 losses
By knockout	32	7
By decision	44	22
By disqualification	3	0
Draws	9	
No contests	2	

Record with the inclusion of newspaper decision in the win/loss/draw column.

No.	Result	Record	Opponent	Type	Round	Date	Age	Location	Notes
119	Loss	79–29–9 (2)	David Velasco	PTS	10	Oct 1, 1936	25 years, 346 days	Tampico, Tamaulipas, Mexico	Exact day in Oct unknown
118	Loss	79–28–9 (2)	Pepe Saldana	PTS	10	Apr 19, 1936	25 years, 181 days	Plaza de Toros, Torreon, Coahuila de Zaragoza, Mexico	
117	Loss	79–27–9 (2)	Ritchie Mack	TKO	2 (10)	Nov 27, 1935	25 years, 37 days	Independence Theatre, Nuevo Laredo, Tamaulipas, Mexico	
116	Loss	79–26–9 (2)	Midget Mexico	PTS	10	Jul 4, 1935	24 years, 256 days	Arena Tex Rickard, Nuevo Laredo, Tamaulipas, Mexico	
115	Loss	79–25–9 (2)	Honeyboy Snipes	PTS	10	Sep 10, 1934	23 years, 324 days	Mobile, Alabama, U.S	
114	Loss	79–24–9 (2)	Willard Brown	PTS	10	Jun 25, 1934	23 years, 247 days	American Legion Arena, Mobile, Alabama, U.S	
113	Loss	79–23–9 (2)	Willard Brown	TKO	1 (10)	Jun 11, 1934	23 years, 223 days	Coliseum Arena, New Orleans, Louisiana, U.S	
112	Win	79–22–9 (2)	Jack Blalock	KO	5 (10)	Jun 4, 1934	23 years, 226 days	Mobile, Alabama, U.S	
111	NC	78–22–9 (2)	Jimmy Reed	NC	8 (10)	May 28, 1934	23 years, 219 days	Jacksonville, Florida, U.S	
110	Win	78–22–9 (1)	Jack Blalock	PTS	10	May 7, 1934	23 years, 198 days	Mobile, Alabama, U.S	
109	Win	77–22–9 (1)	Sammy Lucas	KO	6 (10)	Apr 9, 1934	23 years, 190 days	Mobile, Alabama, U.S	
108	Win	76–22–9 (1)	Gene Tillman	NWS	10	Mar 26, 1934	23 years, 156 days	Mobile, Alabama, U.S	
107	Loss	75–22–9 (1)	Young Peter Jackson	TKO	7 (10)	Dec 19, 1933	23 years, 59 days	Olympic Auditorium, Los Angeles, California, U.S	
106	Loss	75–21–9 (1)	Tommy White	PTS	10	Nov 24, 1933	23 years, 34 days	American Legion Arena, Harlingen, Texas, U.S	
105	Loss	75–20–9 (1)	Willard Brown	TKO	4 (10)	Sep 21, 1933	22 years, 335 days	Fair Park Live Stock Arena, Dallas, Texas, U.S	
104	Loss	75–19–9 (1)	Tracy Cox	PTS	10	Sep 6, 1933	22 years, 320 days	Fort McIntosh Bowl, Laredo, Texas, U.S	
103	Win	75–18–9 (1)	Jimmy Murphy	KO	2 (10)	Aug 28, 1933	22 years, 311 days	Arena Tex Rickard, Nuevo Laredo, Tamaulipas, Mexico	
102	Win	74–18–9 (1)	Lou Avery	PTS	10	Aug 14, 1933	22 years, 297 days	Arena Tex Rickard, Nuevo Laredo, Tamaulipas, Mexico	
101	Loss	73–18–9 (1)	Ray Kiser	PTS	10	Jul 31, 1933	22 years, 283 days	Coliseum Arena, New Orleans, Louisiana, U.S.	
100	Loss	73–17–9 (1)	Harry Dublinsky	UD	10	Jul 3, 1933	22 years, 255 days	Coliseum Arena, New Orleans, Louisiana, U.S.	
99	Loss	73–16–9 (1)	Tony Canzoneri	UD	10	May 21, 1933	22 years, 212 days	Heinemann Park, New Orleans, Louisiana, U.S.	Lost world light-welterweight title
98	Win	73–15–9 (1)	Tommy Grogan	PTS	10	Apr 17, 1933	22 years, 178 days	Coliseum Arena, New Orleans, Louisiana, U.S.	
97	Win	72–15–9 (1)	Gabe Chamberlain	KO	5 (10)	Apr 10, 1933	21 years, 172 days	American Legion Arena, Mobile, Alabama, U.S.	
96	Win	71–15–9 (1)	Johnny Jadick	MD	10	Feb 20, 1933	22 years, 122 days	Coliseum Arena, New Orleans, Louisiana, U.S.	Won world light-welterweight title
95	Loss	70–15–9 (1)	Joe Ghnouly	PTS	10	Feb 7, 1933	22 years, 109 days	Arena, Saint Louis, Missouri, U.S.	
94	Loss	70–14–9 (1)	Wesley Ramey	PTS	10	Jan 7, 1933	22 years, 78 days	Arena Nacional, Mexico City, Distrito Federal, Mexico	
93	Win	70–13–9 (1)	Ervin Berlier	UD	10	Dec 19, 1932	22 years, 59 days	Coliseum Arena, New Orleans, Louisiana, U.S.	Won Southern United States lightweight title
92	Win	69–13–9 (1)	Lou Terry	PTS	10	Nov 28, 1932	22 years, 38 days	Coliseum Arena, New Orleans, Louisiana, U.S.	
91	Loss	68–13–9 (1)	Lou Terry	PTS	10	Oct 3, 1932	21 years, 348 days	Coliseum Arena, New Orleans, Louisiana, U.S.	
90	Win	68–12–9 (1)	Joe Ghnouly	PTS	10	Aug 29, 1932	21 years, 313 days	Coliseum Arena, New Orleans, Louisiana, U.S.	
89	Win	67–12–9 (1)	Ray Kiser	PTS	10	Aug 15, 1932	21 years, 299 days	Coliseum Arena, New Orleans, Louisiana, U.S.	
88	Loss	66–12–9 (1)	Davey Abad	PTS	10	Jul 25, 1932	21 years, 278 days	Coliseum Arena, New Orleans, Louisiana, U.S.	
87	Win	66–11–9 (1)	Joe Ghnouly	KO	9 (10)	Jul 11, 1932	21 years, 264 days	Coliseum Arena, New Orleans, Louisiana, U.S.	
86	Win	65–11–9 (1)	Johnny Cook	PTS	10	Jun 13, 1932	21 years, 236 days	Coliseum Arena, New Orleans, Louisiana, U.S.	
85	Win	64–11–9 (1)	Davey Abad	UD	10	Jun 6, 1932	21 years, 229 days	Coliseum Arena, New Orleans, Louisiana, U.S.	
84	Win	63–11–9 (1)	Matty Brock	TKO	9 (10)	May 23, 1932	21 years, 215 days	Coliseum Arena, New Orleans, Louisiana, U.S.	
83	Win	62–11–9 (1)	Ervin Berlier	TKO	8 (10)	Apr 18, 1932	21 years, 180 days	Coliseum Arena, New Orleans, Louisiana, U.S.	
82	Win	61–11–9 (1)	Lou Avery	PTS	10	Mar 7, 1932	21 years, 138 days	Coliseum Arena, New Orleans, Louisiana, U.S.	
81	Loss	60–11–9 (1)	Ray Kiser	PTS	10	Feb 22, 1932	21 years, 124 days	Coliseum Arena, New Orleans, Louisiana, U.S.	
80	Loss	60–10–9 (1)	Kid Azteca	PTS	10	Jan 31, 1932	21 years, 102 days	Arena Tex Rickard, Nuevo Laredo, Tamaulipas, Mexico	
79	Win	60–9–9 (1)	Carlos Garcia	PTS	10	Jan 16, 1932	21 years, 87 days	Arena Nacional, Mexico City, Distrito Federal, Mexico	
78	Win	59–9–9 (1)	Luis Portela	TKO	5 (10)	Jan 1, 1932	21 years, 72 days	El Toreo de Cuatro Caminos, Mexico City, Distrito Federal, Mexico	
77	Draw	58–9–9 (1)	Luis Arizona	PTS	10	Dec 26, 1931	21 years, 66 days	Arena Nacional, Mexico City, Distrito Federal, Mexico	
76	Loss	58–9–8 (1)	Howard Scott	KO	2 (10)	Oct 25, 1931	21 years, 4 days	Arena Tex Rickard, Nuevo Laredo, Tamaulipas, Mexico	
75	Win	58–8–8 (1)	Kid Azteca	PTS	10	Oct 18, 1931	20 years, 362 days	Monterrey, Nuevo León, Mexico	
74	Loss	57–8–8 (1)	Bulldog Gonzalez	PTS	10	Oct 3, 1931	20 years, 347 days	Arena Nacional, Mexico City, Distrito Federal, Mexico	
73	Win	57–7–8 (1)	Marcial Zavala	TKO	5 (10)	Sep 26, 1931	20 years, 340 days	Mexico City, Distrito Federal, Mexico	
72	Loss	56–7–8 (1)	Manuel Villa I	PTS	10	Sep 12, 1931	20 years, 326 days	Arena Nacional, Mexico City, Distrito Federal, Mexico	
71	Win	56–6–8 (1)	Kid Pancho	DQ	7 (10)	Aug 29, 1931	20 years, 312 days	Arena Nacional, Mexico City, Distrito Federal, Mexico	
70	Win	55–6–8 (1)	Pedro Ortega	PTS	10	Aug 22, 1931	20 years, 305 days	Arena Nacional, Mexico City, Distrito Federal, Mexico	
69	Draw	54–6–8 (1)	Pablo Alejandro	PTS	10	Aug 1, 1931	20 years, 284 days	Arena Nacional, Mexico City, Distrito Federal, Mexico	
68	Win	54–6–7 (1)	Pablo Alejandro	PTS	10	Jul 18, 1931	20 years, 270 days	Monterrey, Nuevo León, Mexico	
67	Win	53–6–7 (1)	Bobby Cohen	KO	4 (10)	Jul 8, 1931	20 years, 260 days	Arena Tex Rickard, Nuevo Laredo, Tamaulipas, Mexico	
66	Win	52–6–7 (1)	Carlos Garcia	PTS	12	Jun 24, 1931	20 years, 246 days	Arena Tex Rickard, Nuevo Laredo, Tamaulipas, Mexico	
65	Win	51–6–7 (1)	Ray Kiser	PTS	10	May 27, 1931	20 years, 218 days	Arena Tex Rickard, Nuevo Laredo, Tamaulipas, Mexico	
64	Win	50–6–7 (1)	Dutch Crozier	KO	4 (10)	May 5, 1931	20 years, 196 days	Arena Tex Rickard, Nuevo Laredo, Tamaulipas, Mexico	
63	Win	49–6–7 (1)	Tommy Nelson	KO	2 (10)	Apr 8, 1931	20 years, 169 days	Riverside Square Garden, Nuevo Laredo, Tamaulipas, Mexico	
62	Loss	48–6–7 (1)	Baby Arizmendi	PTS	10	Feb 28, 1931	20 years, 130 days	Laredo, Texas, U.S.	
61	Win	48–5–7 (1)	Loncho Perez	KO	? (10)	Dec 17, 1930	20 years, 57 days	Riverside Square Garden, Nuevo Laredo, Tamaulipas, Mexico	
60	Draw	47–5–7 (1)	Wildcat Monte	PTS	10	Nov 26, 1930	20 years, 36 days	Riverside Square Garden, Nuevo Laredo, Tamaulipas, Mexico	
59	Win	47–5–6 (1)	Kenneth Johnson	DQ	1 (6)	Nov 21, 1930	20 years, 31 days	Imperial Valley A.C., El Centro, California, U.S.	Johnson landed a low blow near the end of the round
58	Loss	46–5–6 (1)	Johnny Martinez	PTS	4	Nov 1, 1930	20 years, 11 days	Main Street Athletic Club, Los Angeles, California, U.S.	
57	Win	46–4–6 (1)	Frankie Diaz	TKO	5 (6)	Oct 28, 1930	20 years, 7 days	Olympic Auditorium, Los Angeles, California, U.S.	
56	Win	45–4–6 (1)	Trench King	KO	1 (10)	Oct 1, 1930	19 years, 345 days	Ocean Park Arena, Santa Monica, California, U.S.	
55	Win	44–4–6 (1)	Don Smith	TKO	4 (8)	Sep 25, 1930	19 years, 339 days	Legion Stadium, South Gate, California, U.S.	
54	Win	43–4–6 (1)	Johnny Miceli	KO	? (8)	Sep 18, 1930	19 years, 332 days	Legion Stadium, South Gate, California, U.S.	
53	Win	42–4–6 (1)	Lew Tital	TKO	3 (8)	Sep 4, 1930	19 years, 318 days	Legion Stadium, South Gate, California, U.S.	
52	Loss	41–4–6 (1)	Johnny Kid Blair	PTS	4	Aug 27, 1930	19 years, 310 days	Ontario A.C., Ontario, California, U.S.	
51	Draw	41–3–6 (1)	Rita Punay	PTS	10	Aug 20, 1930	19 years, 303 days	Ocean Park Arena, Santa Monica, California, U.S.	
50	Win	41–3–5 (1)	Johnny Moreno	PTS	10	Jul 6, 1930	19 years, 258 days	Rio Rico, Texas, U.S.	
49	Loss	40–3–5 (1)	Carlos Garcia	KO	3 (10)	Jul 4, 1930	19 years, 256 days	Riverside Square Garden, Nuevo Laredo, Tamaulipas, Mexico	
48	Draw	40–2–5 (1)	KO Castillo	PTS	10	Jun 8, 1930	19 years, 230 days	Plaza de Toros, Nuevo Laredo, Tamaulipas, Mexico	
47	Win	40–2–4 (1)	Carlos Garcia	PTS	10	May 18, 1930	19 years, 209 days	Plaza de Toros, Nuevo Laredo, Tamaulipas, Mexico	
46	Win	39–2–4 (1)	Jack Rich	KO	2 (10)	May 4, 1930	19 years, 195 days	Plaza de Toros, Nuevo Laredo, Tamaulipas, Mexico	
45	Win	38–2–4 (1)	Jack Colbert	PTS	10	Apr 20, 1930	18 years, 303 days	Plaza de Toros, Nuevo Laredo, Tamaulipas, Mexico	
44	Win	37–2–4 (1)	Ted Miranda	PTS	10	Aug 22, 1929	18 years, 305 days	Bay City, Michigan, U.S.	
43	Win	36–2–4 (1)	Ted Miranda	PTS	10	Aug 15, 1929	18 years, 298 days	Clare, Michigan, U.S.	
42	Win	35–2–4 (1)	Ted Miranda	PTS	6	Aug 9, 1929	18 years, 292 days	Clare, Michigan, U.S.	
41	Win	34–2–4 (1)	Ted Miranda	PTS	6	Aug 1, 1929	18 years, 284 days	Charlevoix, Michigan, U.S.	
40	Win	33–2–4 (1)	Kid Ruiz	KO	5 (10)	Jul 6, 1929	18 years, 228 days	Nuevo Laredo, Tamaulipas, Mexico	
39	Win	32–2–4 (1)	Johnny Hughes	PTS	10	May 27, 1929	18 years, 218 days	Robinson's Arena, Mercedes, Texas, U.S.	
38	Win	31–2–4 (1)	Kid Ruiz	KO	8 (10)	May 14, 1929	18 years, 205 days	Robinson's Arena, Mercedes, Texas, U.S.	
37	Draw	30–2–4 (1)	Brooks Hooper	PTS	10	Apr 29, 1929	18 years, 190 days	Robinson's Arena, Mercedes, Texas, U.S.	
36	Win	30–2–3 (1)	Kid Brooks	PTS	10	Apr 22, 1929	18 years, 183 days	Bartlesville, Oklahoma, U.S.	
35	Win	29–2–3 (1)	Kid Ruiz	DQ	6 (10)	Apr 1, 1929	18 years, 162 days	Robinson's Arena, Mercedes, Texas, U.S.	Ruiz was disqualified for hitting low
34	Draw	28–2–3 (1)	Wildcat Monte	PTS	10	Mar 18, 1929	18 years, 148 days	Mercedes, Texas, U.S.	Exact date in March unknown
33	Draw	28–2–2 (1)	Kid Pancho	PTS	10	Mar 4, 1929	18 years, 134 days	Ohio Av. Arena, Mercedes, Texas, U.S.	
32	Win	28–2–1 (1)	Dick Wymore	PTS	10	Feb 25, 1929	18 years, 127 days	Fort Brown Skating Rink, Brownsville, Texas, U.S.	
31	Win	27–2–1 (1)	Ken Macey	PTS	8	Feb 18, 1929	18 years, 120 days	Mercedes, Texas, U.S.	
30	Win	26–2–1 (1)	Kid Pancho	KO	9 (10)	Feb 1, 1929	18 years, 103 days	Texas, U.S.	Precise date of bout unknown at this time
29	Win	25–2–1 (1)	Ken Macey	PTS	10	Dec 12, 1928	18 years, 52 days	Texas, U.S.	Precise date of bout unknown at this time
28	Win	24–2–1 (1)	Mickey Cromwell	KO	6 (6)	Oct 24, 1928	18 years, 3 days	Kelly Field Stadium, San Antonio, Texas, U.S.	
27	Win	23–2–1 (1)	Pablo Alejandro	NWS	6	Oct 23, 1928	18 years, 2 days	Jack Shelton Arena, San Antonio, Texas, U.S.	
26	Loss	22–2–1 (1)	Al Kober	TKO	6 (10)	Oct 11, 1928	17 years, 356 days	Fort McIntosh Bowl, Laredo, Texas, U.S.	
25	Win	22–1–1 (1)	Sailor Barrera	PTS	10	Jul 6, 1928	17 years, 229 days	Laredo, Texas, U.S.	
24	Win	21–1–1 (1)	Joe Malavanos	KO	5 (?)	Jul 1, 1928	17 years, 254 days	Texas, U.S.	Precise date of bout unknown at this time
23	Win	20–1–1 (1)	Kid Torreon	KO	4 (6)	Jun 13, 1928	17 years, 236 days	Mercedes, Texas, U.S.	
22	Win	19–1–1 (1)	Juan Hernandez	PTS	6	Jun 10, 1928	17 years, 233 days	Texas, U.S.	Precise date of bout unknown at this time
21	NC	18–1–1 (1)	Jesse Sada	NC	6 (8)	Jun 7, 1928	17 years, 230 days	Fort McIntosh Bowl, Laredo, Texas, U.S.	The fight was halted as neither fighter seemed to giving his best
20	Win	18–1–1	Dick Wymore	TKO	9 (10)	May 7, 1928	17 years, 199 days	Ohio Av. Arena, Mercedes, Texas, U.S.	
19	Win	17–1–1	Joe Montana	PTS	10	Apr 16, 1928	17 years, 178 days	Mercedes, Texas, U.S.	
18	Win	16–1–1	George Marcus	TKO	4 (6)	Feb 28, 1928	17 years, 130 days	Business Men's A.C., San Antonio, Texas, U.S.	
17	Draw	15–1–1	Dick Wymore	PTS	10	Feb 27, 1928	17 years, 129 days	Mercedes, Texas, U.S.	
16	Win	15–1	Newsboy Reyes	NWS	6	Feb 14, 1928	17 years, 116 days	Business Men's A.C., San Antonio, Texas, U.S.	
15	Win	14–1	Newsboy Reyes	NWS	6	Feb 7, 1928	17 years, 109 days	Business Men's A.C., San Antonio, Texas, U.S.	
14	Win	13–1	Terry Young	TKO	2 (6)	Jan 31, 1928	17 years, 102 days	Business Men's A.C., San Antonio, Texas, U.S.	
13	Win	12–1	Kid George	NWS	4	Jan 27, 1928	17 years, 98 days	Aurora A.C. Gym, San Antonio, Texas, U.S.	
12	Win	11–1	Joe Montana	TKO	7 (8)	Dec 23, 1927	17 years, 63 days	Fort McIntosh Theatre, Laredo, Texas, U.S.	
11	Win	10–1	Jesse Sada	TKO	5 (8)	Nov 11, 1927	17 years, 21 days	Fort McIntosh Bowl, Laredo, Texas, U.S.	
10	Win	9–1	Bill Cody	KO	1 (8)	Oct 27, 1927	17 years, 6 days	Fort McIntosh Bowl, Laredo, Texas, U.S.	
9	Win	8–1	Kid Monterrey	PTS	8	Oct 20, 1927	16 years, 364 days	Fort McIntosh Bowl, Laredo, Texas, U.S.	
8	Win	7–1	Kid Torreon	PTS	8	Oct 13, 1927	16 years, 357 days	Fort McIntosh Bowl, Laredo, Texas, U.S.	
7	Win	6–1	Kid George	NWS	6	Sep 27, 1927	16 years, 341 days	Soledad Roof, San Antonio, Texas, U.S.	
6	Win	5–1	Terry Young	NWS	6	Sep 20, 1927	16 years, 334 days	Soledad Roof, San Antonio, Texas, U.S.	
5	Win	4–1	Kid George	NWS	6	Aug 30, 1927	16 years, 313 days	Soledad Roof, San Antonio, Texas, U.S.	
4	Win	3–1	Kid George	PTS	6	Aug 19, 1927	16 years, 302 days	Fort McIntosh Bowl, Laredo, Texas, U.S.	
3	Win	2–1	Young Pancho	KO	2 (4)	Jul 28, 1927	16 years, 280 days	Fort McIntosh Bowl, Laredo, Texas, U.S.	
2	Win	1–1	Terry Young	NWS	4	Jul 12, 1927	16 years, 264 days	Soledad Roof, San Antonio, Texas, U.S.	
1	Loss	0–1	Brooks Hooper	NWS	4	Jun 28, 1927	16 years, 250 days	Soledad Roof, San Antonio, Texas, U.S.	

== See also ==
- List of light welterweight boxing champions
- List of Mexican boxing world champions

Achievements
Preceded by Johnny Jadick	World Light Welterweight Champion; 20 Feb 1933–21 May 1933	Succeeded by Tony Canzoneri
