= Wildcat Monte =

American boxer

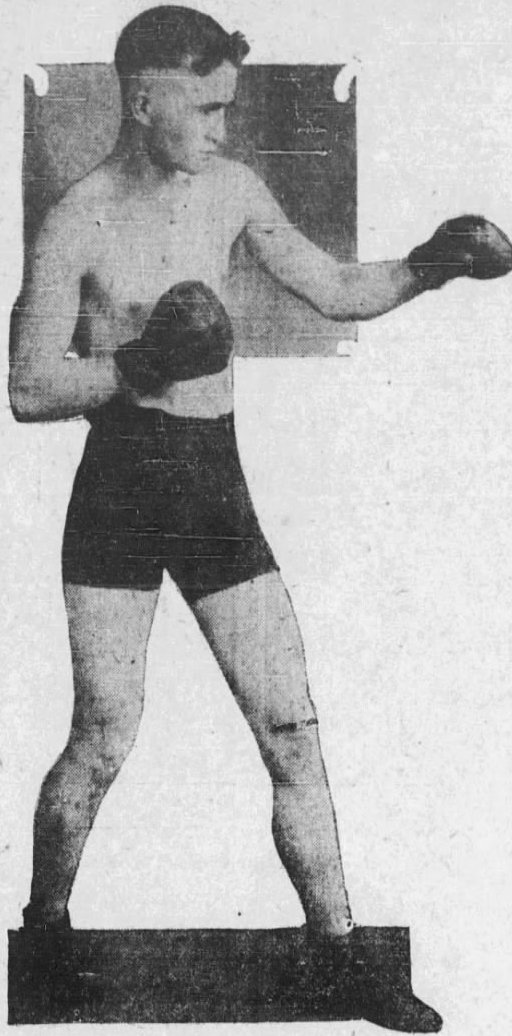

Personal information
- Nickname: The Golden Sandstorm
- Nationality: American
- Born: Monte Deadwiley; February 15, 1905 Amarillo, Texas
- Died: October 26, 1961 (aged 56) Hot Springs, Arkansas
- Weight: Welterweight

Boxing career

Boxing record
- Total fights: 375
- Wins: 232
- Win by KO: 68
- Losses: 55
- Draws: 32
- No contests: 2

Monte Deadwiley (Note: While BoxRec notes a middle initial (H.), the Veterans Affairs BIRLS Death File records his full name as lacking any middle name or middle initial.) (February 15, 1905 – October 26, 1961) was an American professional boxer nicknamed "Wildcat Monte" who fought as a welterweight. He was active from 1923 to 1937 and fought a recorded 313 times in his 13-year career. He has been regarded as one of the most active boxers of his time, having fought over 30 times in one-year periods throughout his career.

== Career ==
Monte debuted on March 16, 1923, in a fight against Bill Bush which he won by decision. He fought a recorded 38 times in 1924 and come close to that in subsequent years. On February 12, 1924, he fought Eddie Mack at the Rialto Theatre in Santa Fe, New Mexico. Monte "proved a flash in the pan and just for a few seconds in the opening frame", but then lost the match by technical knockout in the third round.

Monte fought the Philippine welterweight title holder, Sabino Apara, on February 20, 1929. Monte won by decision with a victory in every round. They rematched on February 15, 1931, which Monte won again by decision.

Monte fought San Francisco boxer Ritchie Mack on October 24, 1932. Monte lost by decision after a 10-round bout. In 1934, Monte fought Herbert Stribling and lost by points after a six-round match at the Coliseum in Coral Gables, Florida. Monte fought Joey Speigal (also spelled Spiegel) on November 26, 1935. After being knocked down three times, Monte said "I've had enough of this", before quitting in the ninth round.

Monte had a reputation of being an "all-action fighter" known for his non-stop frenetic punching style. Despite having a record of 228 wins to 53 losses, Monte was never able to capture a title.

Monte died on October 26, 1961, while on a golf course in Hot Springs, Arkansas; he was survived by his wife and a daughter.
