= Raúl Talán =

Mexican boxer (1907–1992)

Personal information
- Born: 28 February 1907; Cananea, Mexico
- Died: April 1992 (aged 84–85); Mexico City, Mexico

Sport
- Sport: Boxing

Raúl Talán (28 February 1907 – April 1992) was a Mexican boxer. He competed in the men's featherweight event at the 1928 Summer Olympics. At the 1928 Summer Olympics, he lost to Kaarlo Väkevä of Finland.
