= Dexion (disambiguation) =

Dexion may refer to:

- Dexion (1937-2003), a UK company that manufactured slotted angle shelves
- Dexion Asia Pacific (2003-), an Australian-based subsidiary of the preceding
- Dexion Absolute (2002-), an investment company, registered in Guernsey
- Dexion ("receiver"), the name under which the ancient Greek tragedian Sophocles was worshiped as a hero, closely connected with the sanctuary of Amynus
