= Constructor Group =

Constructor Group AS
- Type: Private
- Founded: 1996
- Headquarters: Oslo, Norway
- Area served: Europe
- Products: Shelving, Furniture, Kitchen, Logistics software, storage, archival storage, office storage
- Parent: Altor Equity Partners

Constructor Group AS is a Norwegian-registered international company, with headquarters in Oslo, that specialises in the manufacture and supply of shelving, mobile shelving, pallet racking and similar storage systems, primarily for commercial use in offices, factories, warehouses, museums, archives, libraries and retail outlets.

== Business ==
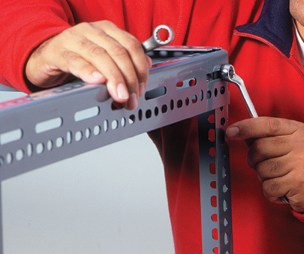
Assembly of Dexion slotted angle

Constructor Group products are delivered through five international brands, plus one UK-based brand:

- Constructor - a racking and shelving business which during the 1980s consolidated several Scandinavian manufacturers
- Constructor Logistics - a developer of warehouse management software
- Dexion - Invented in London by Demetrius Comino, Dexion slotted angle revolutionised adjustable shelving and other forms of racking and storage from the late 1940s onwards
- Kasten - originally a Helsinki, Finland-based metalworking company established in 1886, which started manufacturing shelving in 1951
- PSS (a UK brand - acquired by Constructor Group in 2008)

It is a member of the European Racking Federation.

== History ==
The oldest part of Constructor Group can trace its origins back to 1856.

The current company name was adopted in 1996 following the merger of Electrolux's Swedish subsidiary Electrolux Constructor with Kasten Høvik. At this time, Constructor was owned by Norwegian industrial investment company Aker RGI who, in 2000, acquired the Dexion Group. In 2007, as part of the Aker Material Handling group of companies, it was sold to the Swedish finance investor Altor Equity Partners. In 2018 Constructor Group AS was sold to Gonvarri Material Handling.

In 2010, Constructor Group opened a £5.5m high-tech distribution hub at the former PSS site in Swindon in southern England. In June 2011, it launched an online shelving resource: shelving.co.uk.
