= Adjustable shelving =

Semi-fixed adjustable furniture

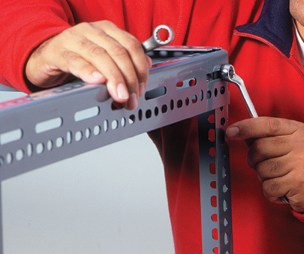
Shelf system consisting of slotted angle irons, perforated with round and oblong holes for mounting shelves by using bolts and nuts

An adjustable shelf is a shelf that can be adjusted according to needs. The most common variant is that the height intervals can be adjusted to accommodate various items. This allows more flexible use to hold items of value for storage, display or sale. Like fixed shelves, the horizontal planes are normally made of strong materials such as wood or steel (and occasionally glass or other materials), but their vertical positioning can be varied – usually through small, exact holes into which the supporting brackets have been inserted, or in an older method, slots which are an integral part of the cabinet itself into which the shelves are inserted.

Adjustable shelves are available in many variants. Pallet racks as found in modern warehouses are some of the toughest and most durable adjustable shelves, being designed to bear extremely heavy industrial loads on pallets.

== History ==
Seeking a more flexible and reusable alternative to wooden shelving to store paper and other consumables in his London-based printing business, engineer Demetrius Comino invented the slotted angle steel construction system, Dexion, and began production in 1947. This quickly became popular internationally for domestic and commercial shelving, warehouse pallet racking and other purposes. Dexion and other shelving and racking brands are still marketed by the Norwegian Constructor Group. The Dexion-style slotted angle or angle iron was also widely copied by other manufacturers using different configurations of slots, different metal thicknesses, and different metals (e.g.: aluminum).

== Application ==
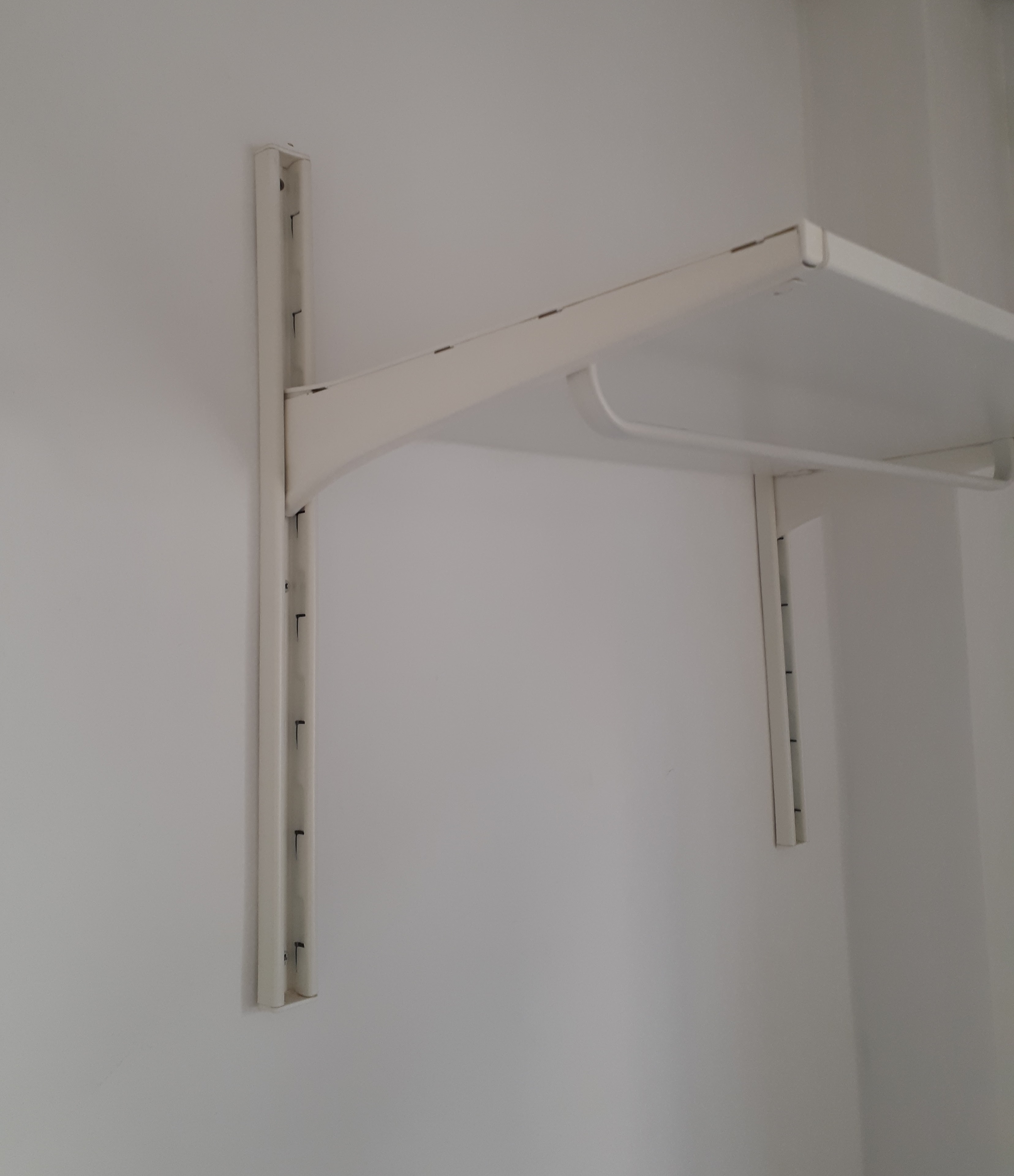
Wall-fixed system where the shelf brackets hang from vertical standards

Purpose-built adjustable shelving systems can be fixed from a wall and/or be floor-standing.

- Common wall-fixed systems comprise parallel metal strips (attached to the wall by screws) which have slots into which brackets can be fitted to hold shelves.
- Free-standing shelf frames are also usually manufactured from metal (usually steel), though the shelves may be made of wood. The metal frames may be formed of slotted angle - steel strips longitudinally pressed into a right-angle or L-shaped section (C- and box-section systems are also used where structures have to carry particularly heavy loads); these sections are perforated with circular holes or elongated slots to allow shelves to be mounted directly or fixed using nuts and bolts. The most heavy duty form of adjustable shelving is pallet racking.

== See also ==
- 32 mm cabinetmaking system, standardised mounting method which allows interval adjustment of furniture shelves, supports, drawer slides and hinges
- Eurobox, system of reusable containers for transport and storage in standardised sizes
- Floating shelf
- French cleat, modular way of securing objects to a wall, e.g. for adjustable shelving
- Preferred metric sizes
