= Comino Foundation =

UK educational charitable organization

- Founded: 1971
- Type: Charitable organization
- Registration no.: England and Wales: 312875
- Purpose: Education/training
- Location: Firs Farm House, Bilby, Retford, Nottinghamshire DN22 8JB
- Origins: Founded in 1971
- Region served: England and Wales
- Administrator: Anthony Darbyshire
- Website: www.cominofoundation.org.uk

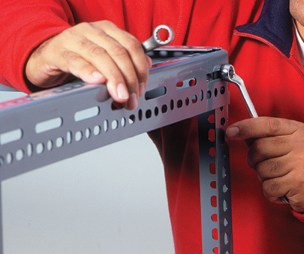
Assembly of Dexion slotted angle

The Comino Foundation is a United Kingdom-based educational charitable organization. It was founded in 1971 by, and takes its name, from Australia-born engineer and inventor Demetrius Comino and his daughter Anna.

Known as Dimitri to his friends, Comino founded Dexion, the storage system manufacturing business in 1947. Dexion is still marketed today as part of the Norway-based multinational Constructor Group and the Australia-based GUD Holdings.

Following the 1968 public flotation of Dexion, Comino arranged income to establish the Comino Foundation. He wanted to support the development in the UK of a prosperous and responsible society by promoting approaches to learning which would lead to new understandings of the process of achievement. He was also committed to changing British attitudes to industry, particularly manufacturing.

== History ==
Throughout his career, Comino had looked to develop generic approaches to practical problem-solving. He devised a simple 'Problem-solving Procedure' (PSP) in 1956; he then defined ingredients for problem solving and achievement - PACRA (Purpose-Alternatives-Criteria-Resources-Action); and then promoted the GRASP process (Getting Results And Solving Problems - also known as Getting Results and Seizing Potential).

An early activity was a series of discussion dinners organised by Edward de Bono between 1976 and 1980. Comino also engaged in debate with Keith Jackson who was researching problem-solving at the then Henley Administrative Staff College and the Foundation part-funded Jackson for several years as a professor at the Centre for Education Management at Bulmershe College of Higher Education near Reading.

Comino was determined, however, to deploy his GRASP approach which came to the attention of Dr Eric Bates CBE who was Head of the Department of Trade and Industry (DTI) Education Unit. This Unit part funded pioneering work on applying the GRASP approach in schools in Dudley and elsewhere. On his retirement from the DTI, Bates was persuaded by Comino to become the Education Fellow for the Foundation. In this role he deployed GRASP through several Comino Centres over the period 1977 to 2002 with a number of papers being written. The relationships with these Centres stimulated other initiatives - for example, the STEM Leadership qualification with the Centre for Science Education at Sheffield Hallam University and Intense Mentoring at Homeground, a centre to support homeless young people in Liverpool. Apart from the Comino Centres, the Foundation also funded the use of GRASP in training staff to develop advanced techniques to improve the development of children with motor disorders at the PACE Centre. Work with some of the Comino Centres continues with the most recent being established at the RSA Academy in Tipton.

In parallel, Comino was also involved with discussions about 'anti-industrial' attitudes, and the Comino Foundation funded a fellowship which enabled Kenneth Adams CVO CBE (then director of studies at St George's House, Windsor Castle) to study and identify the causes of such views, producing a report "Attitudes to Industry in Britain" in 1979. This work stimulated a series of 50 consultations at St George's House, an early outcome of which was the formation of the Industry and Parliament Trust in 1977. It also led, in the early 1980s, to a Comino Fellowship being funded through the Royal Society of Arts, 'to change the cultural attitude to industry from one of lack of interest or dislike to one of concern and esteem'. This eventually led to a joint government/industry initiative to promote 1986 as "Industry Year", with the RSA and the Comino Foundation providing core funding of £250,000 - which persuaded the Confederation of British Industry to raise £1 million and government departments to provide £3 million. Using his wide range of contacts Kenneth Adams persuaded leaders of industry, with support from the Comino Foundation, to establish the Foundation for Manufacturing and Industry in 1993 and became its first chairman. This organisation subsequently became the Institute for Manufacturing within the Department of Engineering at Cambridge University.

== Purpose ==
The vision of the Comino Foundation is of "a Britain in which people are equipped and motivated to live fulfilling and purposeful lives and therefore contribute to sustaining a prosperous and responsible society."

== Activities ==
The Foundation encourages and supports innovative ventures designed to enable people to function effectively and to thrive. It looks for better ways of developing people's capabilities, their capacity and desire to make things happen - their zest and appetite to learn, to create and to change things for the better, for themselves and others.

The Foundation has defined as its priorities for the next few years:

- Social opportunity - which to the Foundation means finding approaches or initiatives which help people, whatever their background, to live fulfilling and productive lives in whatever ways have meaning and value for them;
- Personal capabilities - developing approaches which enhance young people's personal capacity to cope with the demands of growing up, with adult life and their careers;
- Improving practical, technical, vocational capability, especially that which relates to designing and making, to innovation and to manufacturing.

Activities designed to support the achievement of these priorities are carried out through a network of grantees. This work is coordinated by the Comino Foundation's Development Fellow. Current activities are described on the Foundation's web-site."
