= Sabertooth beaver =

American content creator, YouTube channel, and media brand

Blake Goddard

Instagram information
- Page: sabertoothbeaver
- Years active: 2020–present
- Followers: 10.5 k

TikTok information
- Page: Sabertooth Beaver
- Followers: 6822

X information
- Handle: @Sabertoothbeave
- Display name: Sabertoothbeaver
- Years active: 2020–present
- Followers: 3

YouTube information
- Channel: SABERTOOTH BEAVER
- Years active: 2020–present
- Subscribers: 17.3 k
- Views: November 23, 2026

Sabertooth Beaver is an American content creator, YouTube channel, and media brand created by Blake Goddard. Based in the United States, the channel features do-it-yourself projects, woodworking, workshop organization, home improvement, personal storytelling, family, and humor. It explores collecting, family relationships, hobbies, and the experience of pursuing multiple interests almost to a compulsive degree.

Established in 2020, Sabertooth Beaver initially focused on a garage remodel, woodworking techniques, french cleat storage systems, and building projects. It expanded to short form videos; storytelling; reflection on ADHD, autism, and OCD; and discussions of the relationship between creativity, personal identity, and everyday life.

The channel operates under the motto Semper Struetes, translated from Latin as "Always Building". The expression reflects a recurring theme of the channel: building as both a physical activity and a metaphor for learning, self-improvement, family relationships, and the accumulation of life experiences.
