= Demetrius Comino =

Engineer, inventor, entrepreneur and philanthropist

- Born: 4 December 1902; Sydney, Australia
- Died: 27 September 1988 (aged 85); Athens, Greece
- Engineering career
- Awards: OBE (1963)

Demetrius Comino OBE (4 September 1902 – 27 September 1988) was an Australian engineer, inventor, entrepreneur and philanthropist during the 20th century. He invented the slotted angle steel construction system, Dexion, which became widely used internationally for commercial shelving, storage racking, exhibition stands, accommodation, and for domestic purposes. In 1971 he founded the Comino Foundation, an educational charity.

== Early career ==
Demetrius (always known as 'Dimitri') Comino (Greek: Δημήτριος Κομηνός) was born in Sydney, the eldest son of a Greek oyster merchant who had migrated from the island of Kythira in 1884. He demonstrated his creativity aged 12 when he invented a toy submarine, and after attending Sydney Grammar School, travelled to London in 1921 to study electrical engineering at University College London. After graduating with a first class honours degree in 1924, Comino served a three-year apprenticeship with British Thomson-Houston in Rugby before leaving to establish a printing business, Krisson Printing Ltd, near Oxford Circus in central London ("Krisson" being Greek for 'better').

The printing business grew quickly, but Comino never felt happy in printing and wanted further business challenges. In 1937, he established Dexion Ltd (from the Greek for 'right') to market products he had developed and patented to improve the efficiency of the printing process. These included: a gauge to check the squareness and register of a printer's forme; trolleys; chutes; a duplicate book; interlocking frames to hold print in place inside the chase; and a compositor's chart. As a printer, he was also concerned about the lack of versatility of the wooden shelving often for storing paper and other consumables. He began to work on steel shelving which could readily be assembled, dismantled and then reassembled. By 1939 he had developed an angled section made of steel with slots cut down one side and a long groove cut down the other. Birmingham-based Accles & Pollock manufactured an initial batch which was delivered in late August, a week before the declaration of the Second World War on 3 September 1939, and Comino sold most of this angled section to local stores of Lillywhites, John Lewis and Selfridges.

During the war, partly because of paper rationing, the Krisson printing business shrank, but Comino's engineering background and problem-solving mentality helped him shift into new areas of machining. Having turned down a managerial position in an aircraft factory offered by the Ministry of Aircraft Production, he installed equipment to make aircraft parts, with the Ministry of Labour allocating lathes, drills, milling machines and other machine tools.

Meanwhile, Comino continued to experiment with the angled steel lengths made before the war. Eventually, he worked out that by fitting one angled section into another and bolting them together through carefully positioned holes he could produce a very rigid joint, and, in addition to adjustable shelving, he began to develop ideas of what other structures could be created using the product.

== Dexion ==
After the war, Krisson resumed as a printing business, but Comino left day-to-day management in the hands of senior staff so that he could devote himself to the Dexion slotted angle concept (though he did write a history of the printing business, published as The Krisson Story in 1953). Several prototypes were made, and in 1946, with £7000 savings and £7000 borrowed from Krisson's bankers, he invested in a second-hand Henry & Wright standard die press, and began manufacture, adapting the press so that the steel strip could be continuously fed into it and painted. In May 1947, he established a factory in Chingford in north-east London, staffed by nine factory workers and one sales person, but sales were initially disappointing, partly due to post-war cash payment requirements. However, sales and production increased to 50,000 feet per week in 1949, generating a business turnover of £500,000 that year. During 1950, the Dexion strips began to be used for exhibitions, and production reached 125,000 feet per week, and a new Dexion factory was opened in Enfield.

Dexion quickly faced competition. The prior existence of Meccano prevented a generic patent so Dexion patents were restricted to slot and hole configurations, and other UK and European companies began offering different hole patterns and metal strip thicknesses. But by 1956 Dexion's turnover exceeded £2m, and of the company's 700 employees, 200 were based outside its three UK plants – in factories in Australia, Belgium and Canada, with licensees in other countries (France, Chile, Spain, Argentina and the US).

The main scoreboard and television platform at the 1956 Winter Olympics' ski stadium at Cortina d'Ampezzo was constructed from Dexion, and Ghana's independence celebrations in 1957 involved grandstands for 10,000 people, six miles of crush barriers and 500 bunting poles – all made of Dexion.

In 1968, the company went public, buoyed by results showing a 40% increase in world sales to £14m and a new record profit of £1.133m. However, the early 1970s UK recession proved challenging, and following two poor trading years, Dexion came to the attention of Chicago-based steel company Interlake Inc, and a £9.4m sale eventually took place in July 1974, valuing Dexion at £4m less than its 1968 flotation price. Comino, by this point Dexion's chairman, retired, though he retained a place on the company's board until 1978.

Under its new management, Dexion flourished for 20 years with sales reaching £200m by 1995. Interlake then sold Dexion, with ownership eventually passing to the Norway-based Constructor Group AS. UK manufacture ceased in 2003, but Dexion warehouse solutions are still marketed, generating a 2010 turnover of €100m from operations in 30 European countries.

== Philanthropy ==
=== Disaster relief ===
After the August 1953 earthquake rocked the Ionian Islands in Greece, Dexion donated 20,000 feet of its product for new housing (a prototype house was designed within three weeks). "Operation Ulysses" attracted worldwide attention, including an article in Time magazine and British Pathe newsreels. Dexion made a similar gesture following the 1963 Skopje earthquake, providing Dexion building frame materials to enable 49 Royal Engineers to build 1560 dwellings, enough for two complete villages, one of which was nicknamed Dexiongrad. Comino was appointed OBE in 1963 for services to industry.

=== The Comino Foundation ===
Throughout his working life, Comino had looked to develop generic approaches to practical problem-solving. He devised a simple 'Problem-solving Procedure' (PSP) in 1956; he then defined the essential ingredients for problem solving and achievement – PACRA (Purpose-Alternatives-Criteria-Resources-Action); he then promoted what became the GRASP process (Getting Results And Solving Problems – also known as Getting Results and Seizing Potential). These ideas led him to establish the Comino Foundation educational charity in 1971, a step which was financially supported by the proceeds of some dividend income following the 1968 public flotation of Dexion.

The Foundation's objectives included promotion of GRASP and also attempted to change attitudes to manufacturing in the UK. An early activity was a series of discussion dinners organised by Edward de Bono between 1976 and 1980. Comino also worked with Keith Jackson who was researching problem-solving at the then Henley Administrative Staff College; the Foundation then part-funded Jackson for several years as a Professor at the Centre for Education Management at Bulmershe College of Higher Education near Reading, pioneering work on applying the GRASP approach in schools in Dudley that continued through to 1989.

In parallel, Comino was also involved with discussions about 'anti-industrial' attitudes, and the Comino Foundation funded a fellowship which enabled Kenneth Adams to study and identify the causes of such views, producing a report "Attitudes to Industry in Britain" in 1979. The next Comino Fellowship was awarded through the Royal Society of Arts (RSA), which established a Comino Fellowship Committee 'to change the cultural attitude to industry from one of lack of interest or dislike to one of concern and esteem'. This eventually led to a joint government/industry initiative to promote 1986 as "Industry Year", with the RSA and the Comino Foundation providing core funding of £250,000 – which persuaded the Confederation of British Industry to raise £1 million and government departments to provide £3 million.

== Personal life ==
In September 1935, Comino married Katina Georgiadi, the daughter of a well-respected Rhodes family. Together they had one daughter, Anna.

Comino died of a heart attack on 27 September 1988 while on holiday in Athens. A memorial tribute dinner was held on 5 June 1989 at the RSA.

== Legacy ==
Comino's association with Dexion in the UK was marketed until December 2011 with Constructor Group's UK sales office in Swindon trading as Dexion Comino Ltd.

The Comino Foundation continues, and supports Comino Centres at the University of Winchester, Sheffield Hallam University and Liverpool John Moores University.

Comino is also commemorated through an annual award by the Supply Chain & Logistics Association of Australia, which since 1980 has presented an annual "Storage and Handling of Materials Award" trophy dedicated to the Dexion founder.
