= Pallet racking =

Material handling storage aid system designed to store materials on pallets

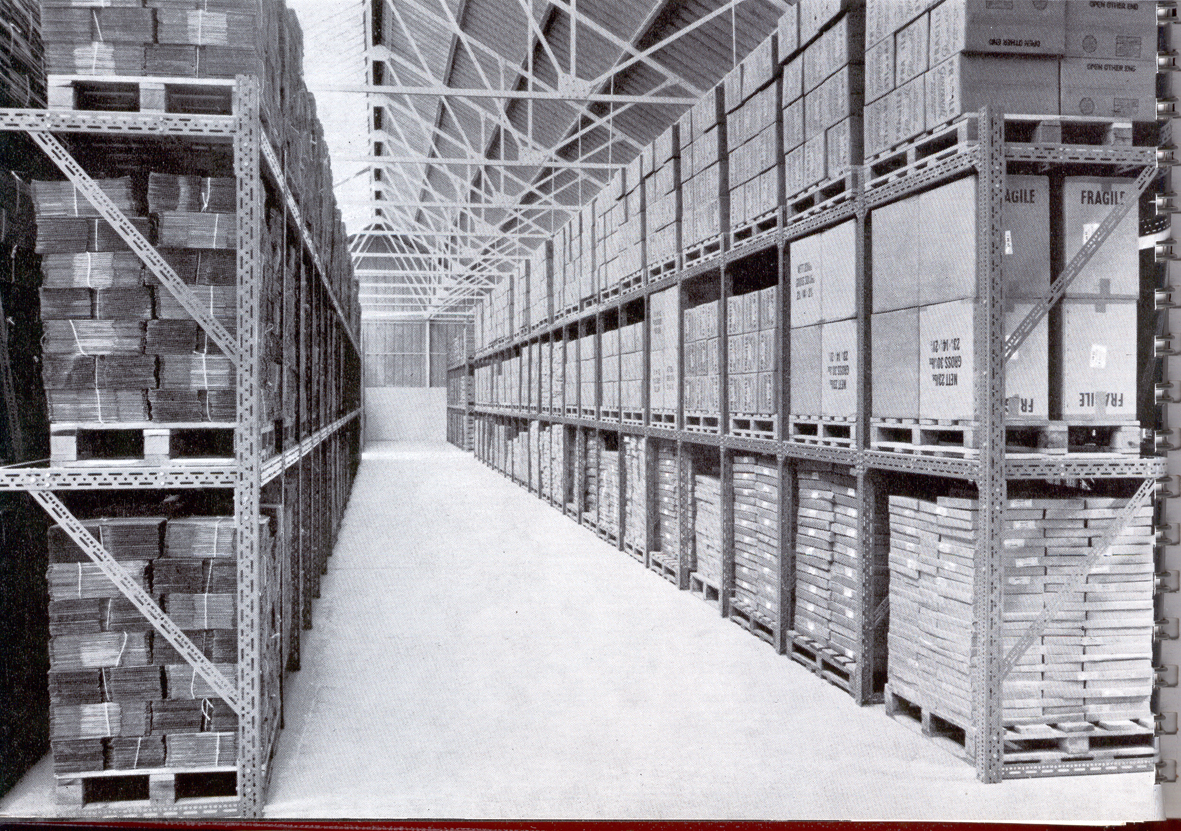
Pallet racking made from Dexion slotted angle

Pallet rack is a material handling storage aid system designed to store materials on pallets (or “skids”). Although there are many varieties of pallet racking, all types allow for the storage of palletized materials in horizontal rows with multiple levels. Forklift trucks are usually required to place the loaded pallets onto the racks for storage. Since the Second World War, pallet racks have become a ubiquitous element of most modern warehouses, manufacturing facilities, retail centers, and other storage and distribution facilities. All types of pallet racking increase storage density of the stored goods. Costs associated with the racking increases with increasing storage density.

== Selective pallet racking systems ==
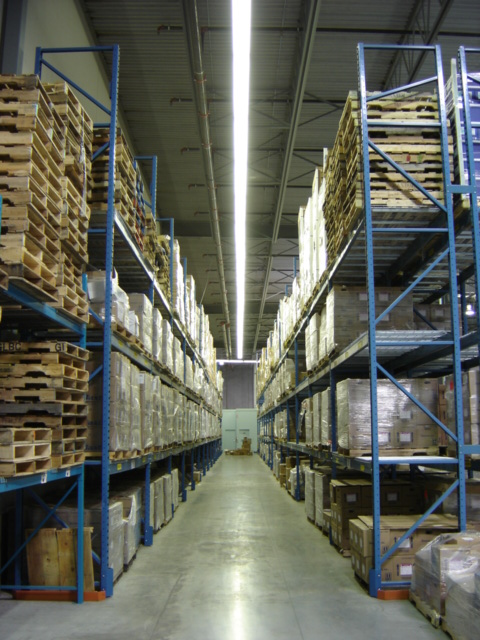
Selective pallet rack

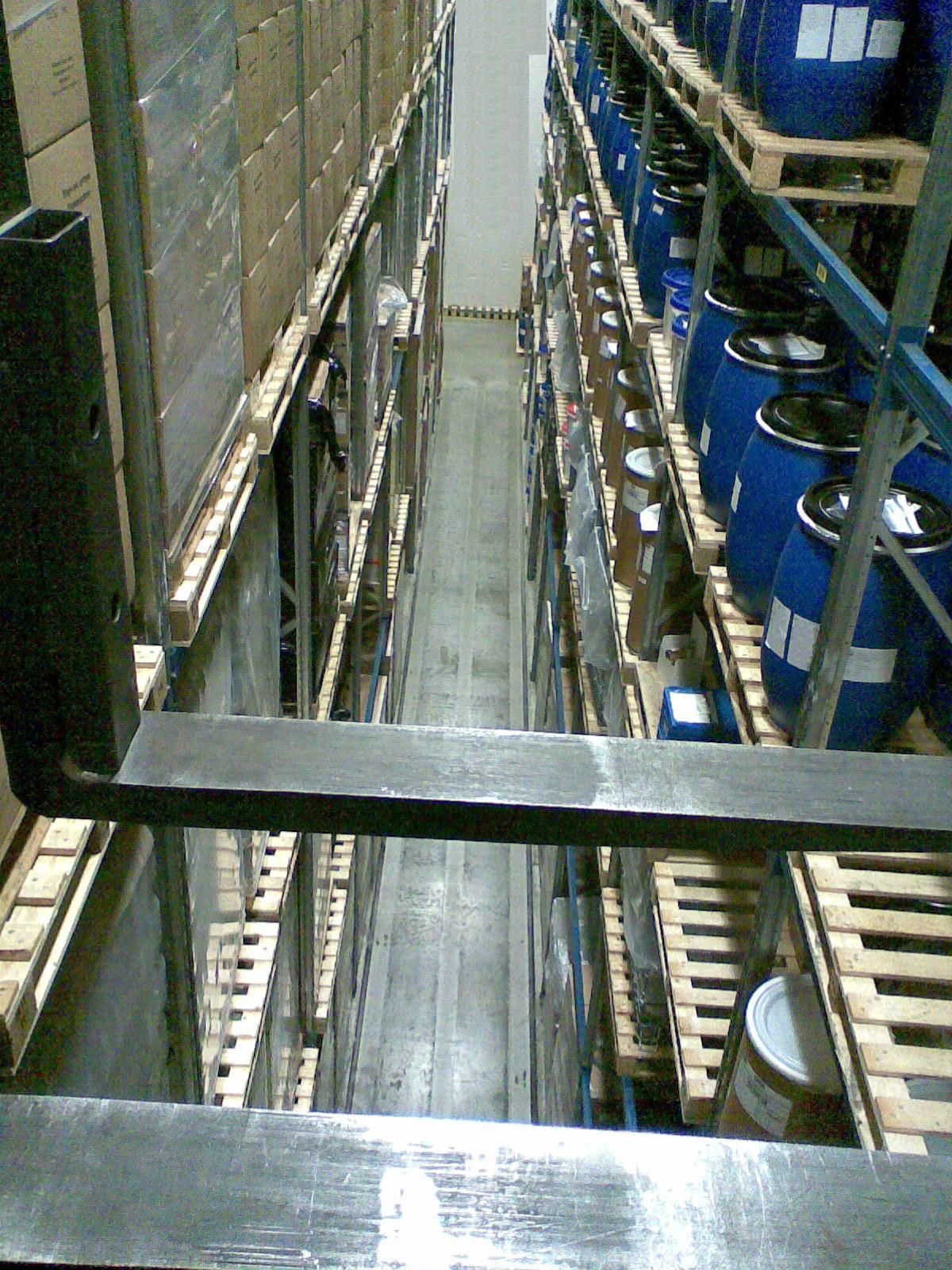
"Very narrow aisle" pallet racks. Picture taken from a "man-up" truck

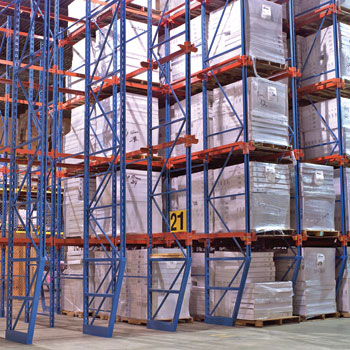
Drive-in pallet rack system

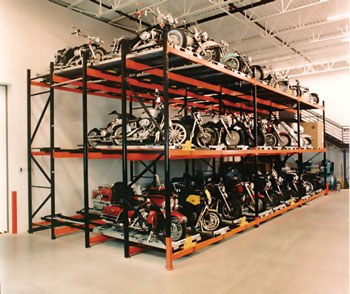
Push back system designed to store pallets of motorcycles

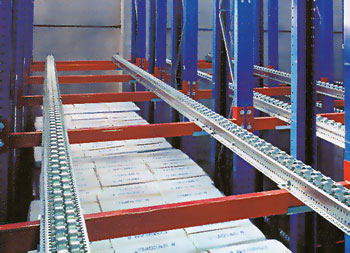
Pallet flow lane showing rollers

Selective pallet racking is a common pallet racking system in use today. Selective pallet racking systems typically come in one of two configurations: a roll formed, or clip-in configuration, and a structural bolt-together configuration.

1. Roll formed selective rack is most commonly manufactured in a "teardrop" style (so named as the holes on the column of the upright are shaped like a teardrop). Pallets then rest on the horizontal load beams that are held in place by mounting clips. Because the clips on teardrop configurations can be quickly moved, the shelves can be easily adjusted to different heights to accommodate various load sizes. This is convenient for a warehouse that needs to store a wide variety of product sizes.
2. Structural pallet rack systems are very similar to roll formed pallet rack systems except the horizontal load beams are attached to the uprights with bolts and have much greater weight-bearing capacity. The bolt fixings make this a form of adjustable shelving - racks can be constructed, reconfigured, and dismantled and reused as necessary.

Structural pallet racking can be designed into the structure of the building itself, so that the upright columns are simultaneously used to support the roof of the storage facility, in which case the structural pallet rack uprights replace the storage building's vertical support I-beams. This system is a rack supported building.

Selective pallet rack systems provide easy accessibility to all products at all times - important if the inventory is rapidly depleted and restocked (called quick turnover). A selective pallet rack system is commonly used in a "big-box" distribution application, as well as in retail store inventory rooms, cold storage applications, wholesale stores, etc.

Common components of selective rack include the following:

1. Load beams (also called step beams or box beams).
  - Most step beams are roll formed members with a 1 5/8 in (41 mm) step along the top inside edge. This step is used to hold any load support components such as pallet supports or wire decks.
  - Box beams have no inset step, instead have four flat sides like a box. All load beams typically mount onto an upright frame column with integral rivets or hooks. Some systems utilize an extra clip or bolt to lock the beam to the upright.
  - Structural beams are hot formed structural C shapes with connecting clips at either end. Structural load beams are generally used with structural uprights but can be used with standard roll formed uprights. Structural load beams offer heavier weight capacities than step beams or box beams.
2. Upright frames (also called upright columns or uprights) vary in size and design depending on load requirements, and styles. The most common upright column is produced by roll forming flat coil stock steel into a modified "C" shape with returns. This style is often referred to as open-back roll-formed columns. Holes or slots are punched during manufacturing up and down the column at standard intervals so that the load beams can be mounted into the upright columns. Upright frames can also be constructed utilizing structural C shapes for columns. Structural uprights have an increased weight capacity over roll formed uprights.
3. Diagonal braces and horizontal braces, commonly referred to as upright frame lacing is usually welded between two upright columns to form selective upright frames. The lacing may be bolted to the columns in some cases.
4. Pallet supports are roll formed channels that are placed front to back between the load beams to support pallets.
5. Timber decking comes in two forms: close boarded and slated. Close boarded decking provides a solid 'floor' to a level of racking while slatted is formed by rows of timber and acts as a permanent pallet.
6. Wire decking is commonly used as a safety measure on selective pallet rack to prevent pallets or the products stored on them from falling through the rack structure. Wire mesh decking comes in various thicknesses and mesh dimensions. Wire mesh construction also allows for easy identification of shelf contents and prevents dirt and other debris from accumulating on the shelves because of the holes in the mesh. Most wire mesh decking has U-shaped channel supports, also known as struts, to support the load. With this waterfall decking, the wire mesh extends across the top and down the front of the beam to provide more support, and is more desirable in the marketplace. Reverse waterfall decking can provide containment of a loose product to prevent the product from falling behind the rack system. Lay-in decking rests inside the step of the beam, and wire mesh does not waterfall over the beam. Some types of decking are manufactured with solid metal instead of wire mesh. Even though the solid decking provides a greater distributed weight capacity, it is discouraged by fire inspectors because sprinkler systems cannot spray through the shelves to levels below.
7. Footplates, also known as footpads or baseplates, are at the base of columns and serve as anchors to give the rack more stability: anchor bolts are inserted through the baseplate's holes to attach the column to the concrete floor. Footplates are made of thicker steel and in some geographic locations, they must be of a certain size and seismic rating. Footpads increase the pallet rack's overall stability and weight-bearing capacity.
8. Shims are used when the uprights are resting on uneven floors; the shims, equal in size to the base of the uprights, are installed beneath the uprights to level the rack.
9. Row spacers are sometimes used if uprights are arranged in back-to-back rows; the spacers are mounted between adjacent columns to ensure that the rows are kept straight and to give the pallet racks even more strength and steadiness.
10. Wall ties may be used for further support if the uprights are arranged in a row along a wall.
11. Column protectors, also known as post protectors, are protective shields that can be installed around the base of an upright to minimize damage where forklifts might hit the upright. Damage to the base of a column can weaken the entire frame and could cause it to collapse. Column protectors are made of various materials such as polyethylene, ductile iron casting, and other durable materials.
12. Guard rails are installed to increase protection for upright columns and for human safety when platforms or steps are attached to pallet racks.

Very narrow aisle (VNA) is the use of selective pallet racking in a tighter configuration to provide maximum space utilization within a storage facility. These systems typically operate in conjunction with wire-guided or rail-guided reach-truck systems. A wire-guided system consists of a wire embedded in the concrete floor that provides tracking for the reach-truck. A rail-guided system consists of angle iron bolted to the floor down the length of each row. Typically, the angle iron is 4 in × 3 in (102 mm × 76 mm) and 1/4–3/8 in (6.4–9.5 mm) inches thick. A distinct advantage of a narrow aisle pallet racking is fast picking without large aisles which results in improved use of space. When there is limited space, a compact storage method is ideal. Fully adjustable system flexibility and space saving aisles can be manipulated as one to give the greatest amount of pallet storage locations.

== Other common types ==
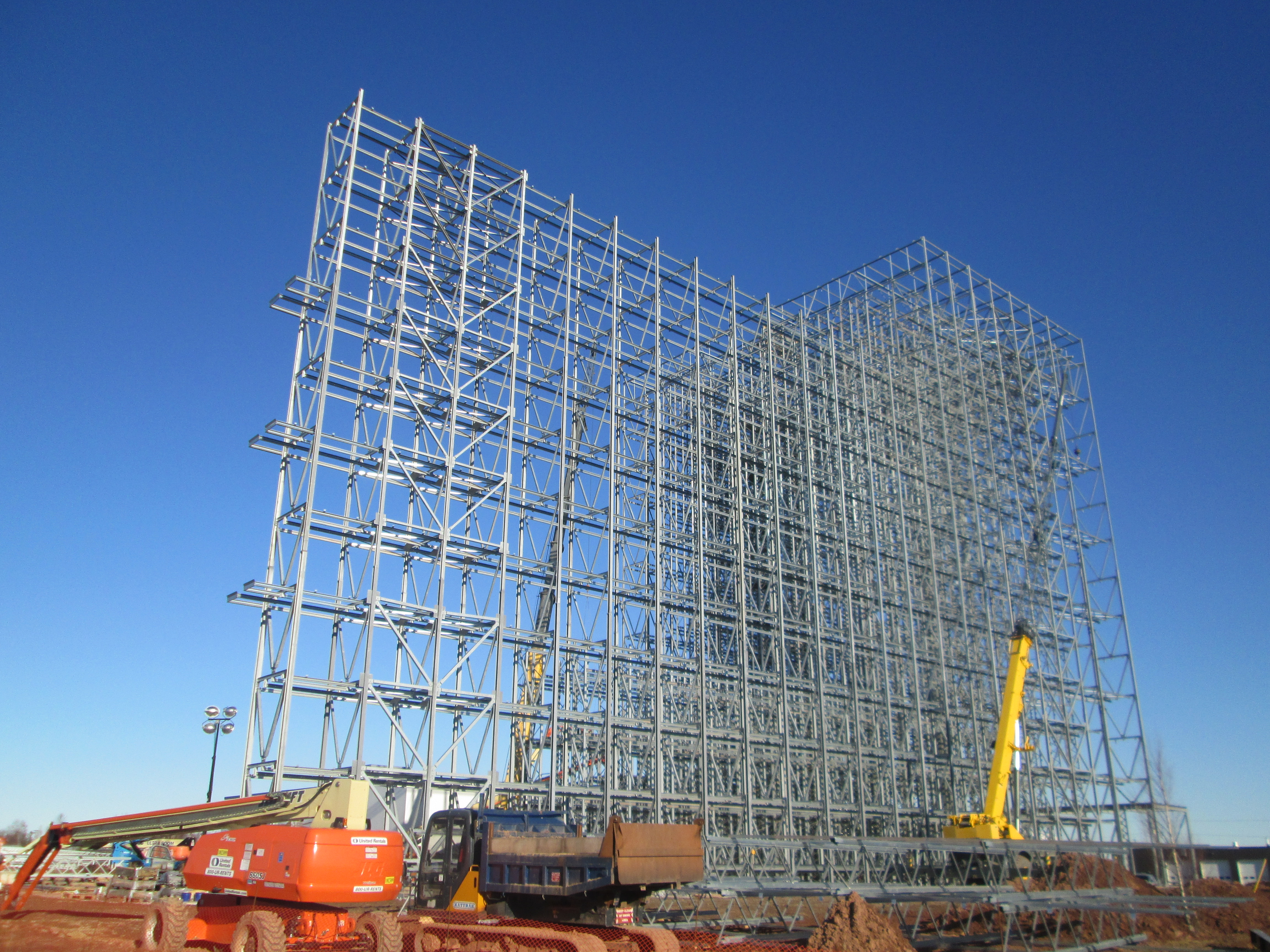
High bay racking supported cold storage facility, under construction in 2018

Many types of pallet storage racks are available with different designs to fulfill specific functions or create specific advantages. To create the ideal pallet racking system, several considerations should be taken into account:

- Desired storage density
- Floor space and building height
- Placement of building doors and columns
- Inventory accessibility
- Inventory rotation
- Item/load size and weight
- Optimal storage design
- Cost of materials and installation

Some of the most common types of pallet rack systems used include:

1. Drive-in and drive-through (sometimes spelled Drive-thru) are storage rack configurations that allow the forklift to drive directly into the lane of stacked rows (called a bay). The difference between a drive-in and a drive-thru pallet rack system is simply whether the bays have an entry at only one end, or at both ends. Drive-in rack systems use a common entry and exit, while drive-thru systems have entry points at either end of the bay. Because a drive-in racking system has only one entrance, it uses what is called a LIFO (last in, first out) storage method. With only one entrance, the last pallet put into a row is necessarily the first one to be taken out. A drive-thru storage system, with two different entry points, can also use a FIFO (first in, first out) storage method. With a FIFO system, pallets are loaded in one end and are pushed back to the other end, where they are then at the front of the row on the opposite side. The first pallet put into such a row is the first one taken out at the other end. This system is advantageous for material with an expiration date or wherever shelf life is a major concern.
2. Push-back pallet rack systems are designed around the principle of organizing space by depth rather than width. This depth arrangement greatly reduces aisle space and increases storage density. In this configuration, each bay can be up to six pallets deep; each pallet stored on wheeled carts that fit onto rails. The rails are slightly angled toward the load/unload side of the rack in order to take advantage of gravity, saving enormous amounts of energy for moving heavy pallets. When a forklift sets the pallet onto the cart, it drives forward and causes the pallet to bump the next pallet, causing the entire row of pallets to roll backwards. When removing a pallet from the front position the remaining pallets immediately stage themselves forward so that the next available pallet can be accessed. Push back rack is a LIFO (last in, first out) storage system.
3. Pallet flow systems are high density pallet storage systems that utilize depth to increase capacity. This system uses a slightly inclined rail with rollers that allow pallets to move easily along the sloped plane. These systems are also called gravity flow or dynamic flow systems. The pallet flow system often has complex motion and braking systems to control the speed of the moving pallet. Pallet flow racking systems are either a FIFO (first in, first out) or a LIFO (last in, first out) storage system. If the system is loaded from the back and unloaded from the front, it is FIFO; if the system is loaded and unloaded from the front it is a LIFO system.
4. Compact mobilized pallet racks (also known as motorized mobile pallet racks or mobile industrial rack system), are designed to maximize the use of warehouse storage space. This can reduce your pallet storage area in half, or double the capacity of your pallet rack storage in the same floor area. It allocates space by converting static access aisles into productive storage space. By mounting rows of pallet racks onto heavy-duty rolling carriages and positioning them on floor tracks. Rows of pallet racks (up to 96’ long) move sideways along the floor tracks creating a movable floating access aisle. Typical warehouse storage facilities may have dozens of static access aisles but only one or two forklifts capable of accessing stored materials. This reduces the number of access aisles to match the velocity requirements of your storage area. Rows of pallet racks are moved by pushing a button or by remote control, which opens access aisles when and where they are needed.

Mobilized storage system has helped many organizations reduce or eliminate new building construction costs, auxiliary warehouses, building expansions, and decrease ongoing operational costs (lighting, energy, insurance) by redistributing the use of their storage floor space.

Some disadvantages of high density pallet storage systems are; less access to all stock at any given moment (although if the stored product is all the same, it should not matter), and the expense of such systems. Selective pallet rack systems are considerably less expensive per pallet position than their higher density counterparts. In most medium to large facilities, however, high density pallet rack systems are essential, since they provide the efficiency of time and high cost facility space is better optimized.

Identifying the brand of racking systems is important to order compatible shelving or resell the racks. It is possible to differentiate between the many pallet rack brands by looking at the shape of the vertical beams, increments of height adjustment and the shape of the holes on the vertical beams.

== Safety considerations ==
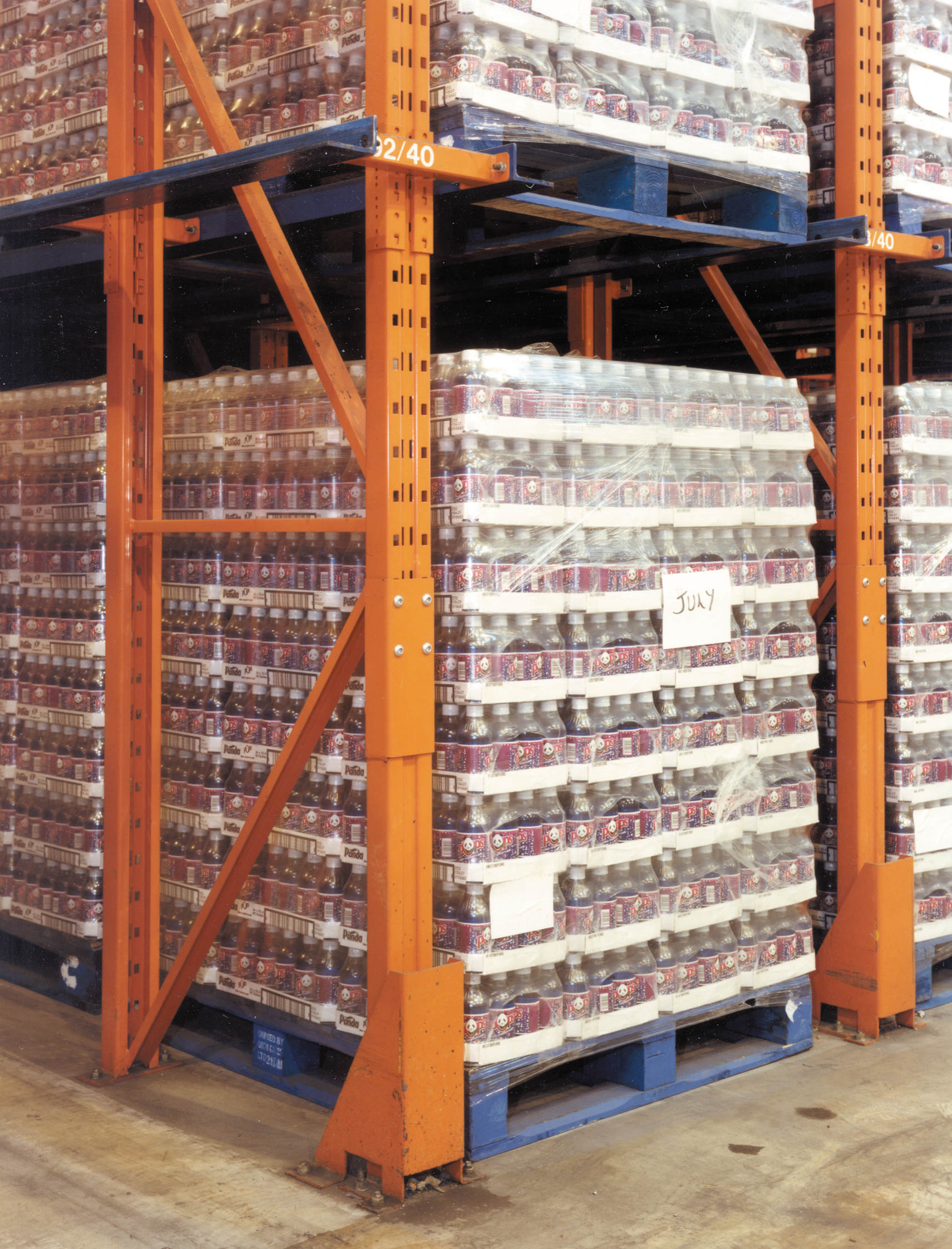
Sacrificial leg with drive-in rack

Because of the size and weight of pallets, safety is relevant.

Workers must pay attention to any loose components in the pallet rack system, and also take the time to report any damage in the pallet rack frame. Such frame damage could cause the pallets to fall.

It is the owner's legal responsibility to communicate this important warning to all who are around storage racks: Never climb on racks during or after assembly. Storage racks are not designed to be stepped on or climbed on. A slip or fall may result in serious injury. 'It is especially important to have highly visible warning signs if the pallet rack system is used in retail environments, such as wholesale centers, where the public is present.

Quality pallets that are not damaged must be used. To save money, or perhaps from neglectful management, some warehouses use pallets until they become faulty and dangerous. Regular inspection of pallets for broken or fractured planks or stringers, protruding nails, and missing support blocks is essential. Damaged pallets can cause loading and unloading problems; for example, loose stringers can get hung up on the pallet racks, which can cause loads to fall from high positions. Also, faulty pallets can cause obstruction problems in flow systems by jamming certain pallet rack designs.

Proper motorized equipment must be used for the application. Obstructing the end of aisles by staging pallets in these areas can cause severe and potentially fatal injuries and accidents. Overloading or exceeding the recommended load specifications for a racking system may cause a catastrophic failure of your storage rack system. Rack audits (safety checks) must be performed regularly by a qualified inspector familiar with RMI design and safety standards. Food products must follow FDA regulations and use approved pallet racks.

== Load containment systems for pallet racks ==
Pallet racks are used throughout industry and distribution facilities for bulk storage of items. Generally, the items stored are boxed goods stacked on pallets which are placed on the rack. The pallets are accessed by some type of mechanized lifting and retrieval device. Sides of a pallet rack must be accessible by the mechanized device for storage and retrieval of goods. Thus these "access sides” must be open; entry to them cannot be permanently blocked/guarded.

However, there are instances where an aisle way is designated along a row of pallet rack for pedestrian or other traffic and not for operational access by the lifting or retrieval device. When a pedestrian or other traffic aisle way is designated along a run of pallet racking it is good practice to guard the aisle way from a potential hazard created by objects that may fall from the pallet rack. In these situations, load containment systems are added to the designated aisle way side of the pallet rack to prevent or control any item from falling off of the back of the rack system or potentially falling on and injuring a person in the aisle. Containment systems may also be placed between back to back installations to prevent items on one side of rack potentially pushing items off the adjacent rack.

There are two types of load containment systems for pallet racking: steel mesh containment panels and netting containment systems.

=== Netting containment systems ===
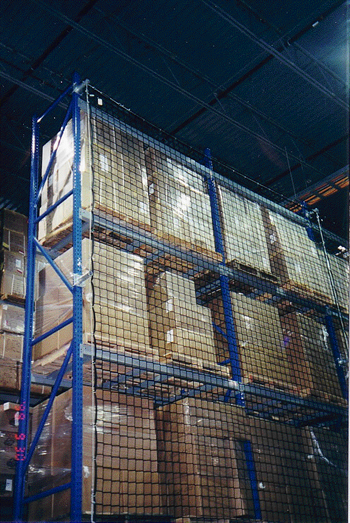
Pallet rack protective netting system.

Load containment safety netting was originally adapted from cargo-based maritime netting used throughout the centuries for nautical trade and exploration. Safety netting has found widespread industrial use in load containment, driven in part by the post-war expansion of warehouse distribution systems. Netting types of varying break-strength and deflection allowances can be used within a load containment netting system. Widely accepted as an alternative to metal or other solid barrier systems, load containment safety netting provides a lightweight, high-strength, easily customizable means to protect goods and personnel while allowing airflow, humidity control and clear visibility within sectioned containment areas.

Netting containment systems are used on rack bays or gravity-flow rack channels to contain loose or falling objects. Palletized parts or boxes can become dislodged during bay loading. Rack netting containment systems can be placed vertically at the front, or pick face, and/or at the rear sides of racking systems prevent dislodged objects or full pallets from falling. Netting containment systems can be applied across multiple bays or as single bay units and secured by varying fasteners determined by frequency of access, load requirements and net or load sizes. Actuating systems can also be found in current netting containment systems to allow remotely operated rack bay access by use of pull cords or other means. In addition to vertical placement, horizontal netting can also be utilized in rack systems to protect against objects falling from one level to another or into tunnel areas, and to provide barriers between storage between and rack supports.

=== Steel mesh containment panels ===
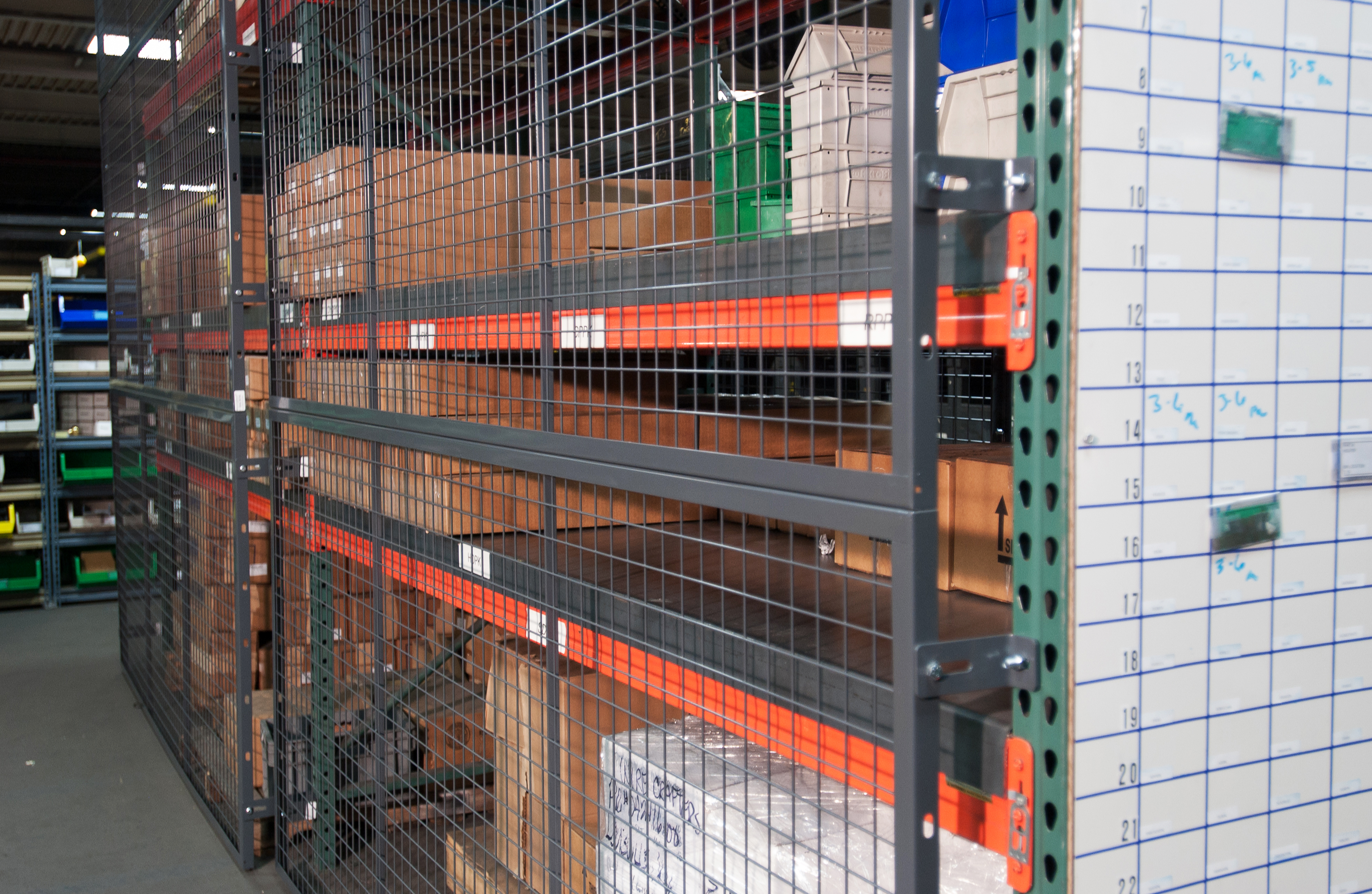
Steel mesh containment panel system for pallet rack.

As the distribution industry grew, alternative methods were sought for containing items dislodged from palletized storage while stored on pallet rack systems. Distributors found steel wire mesh panels were a viable alternative to netting containment systems. The following are the two types of steel mesh containment panels used for pallet racking:

- Framed steel wire mesh panels are constructed of steel wire mesh, which may be welded or woven into a square, diamond, or rectangular pattern or welded or otherwise fixed into a shaped steel frame. The panels are mechanically attached to the existing pallet rack uprights with brackets. The panels may be mounted flush with the rack uprights, or more commonly, offset by several inches to allow for load overhang.
- Unframed steel wire mesh panels are constructed of welded wire mesh with a bond shear edge (no tails on the edge) mechanically attached to the existing upright posts by the way of stand-off brackets, or sleeves of various lengths.

== See also ==
- Pallet rack mover
