= Shelf (storage) =

Flat horizontal plane used for storage

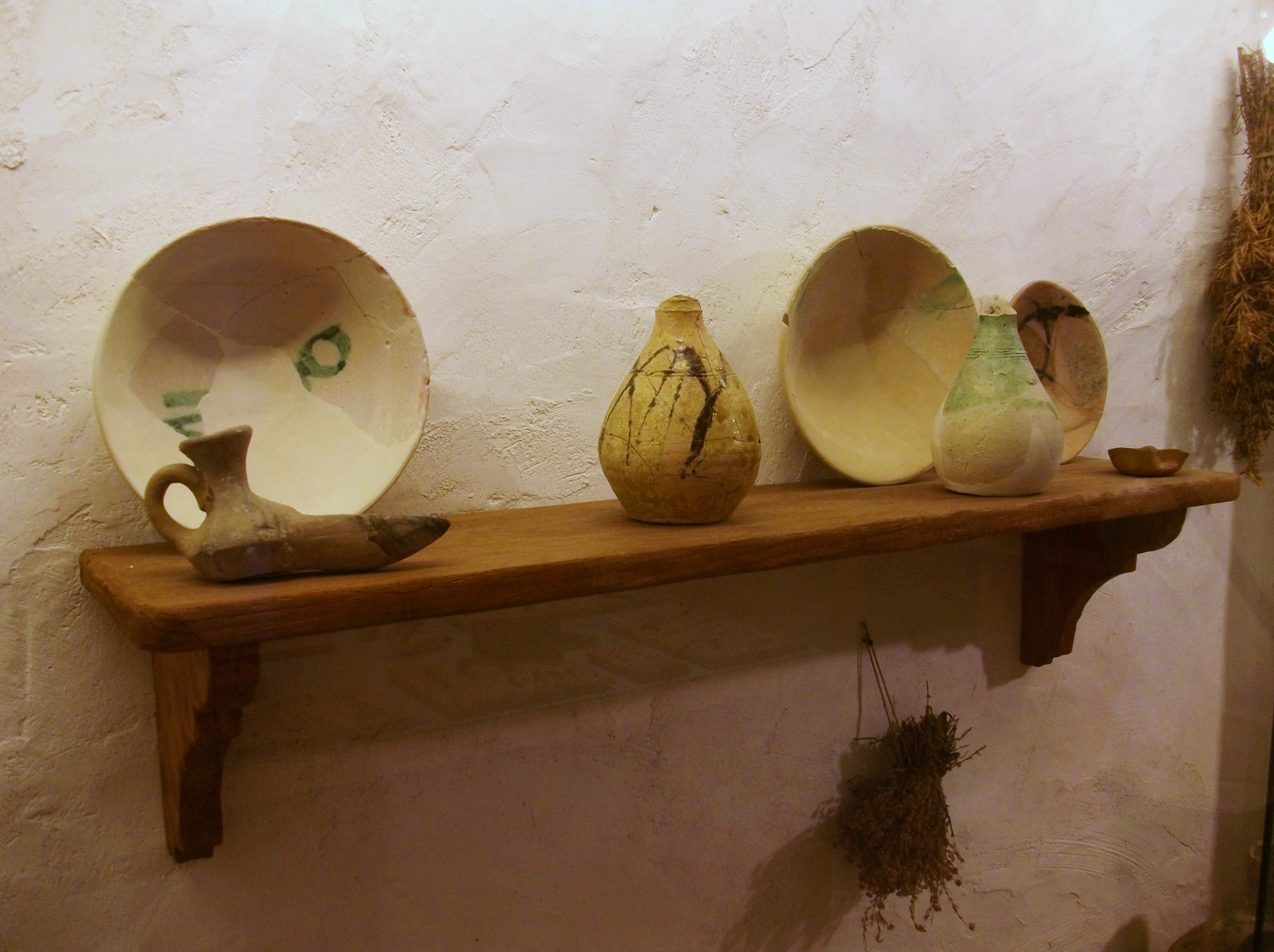
A simple wooden wall shelf

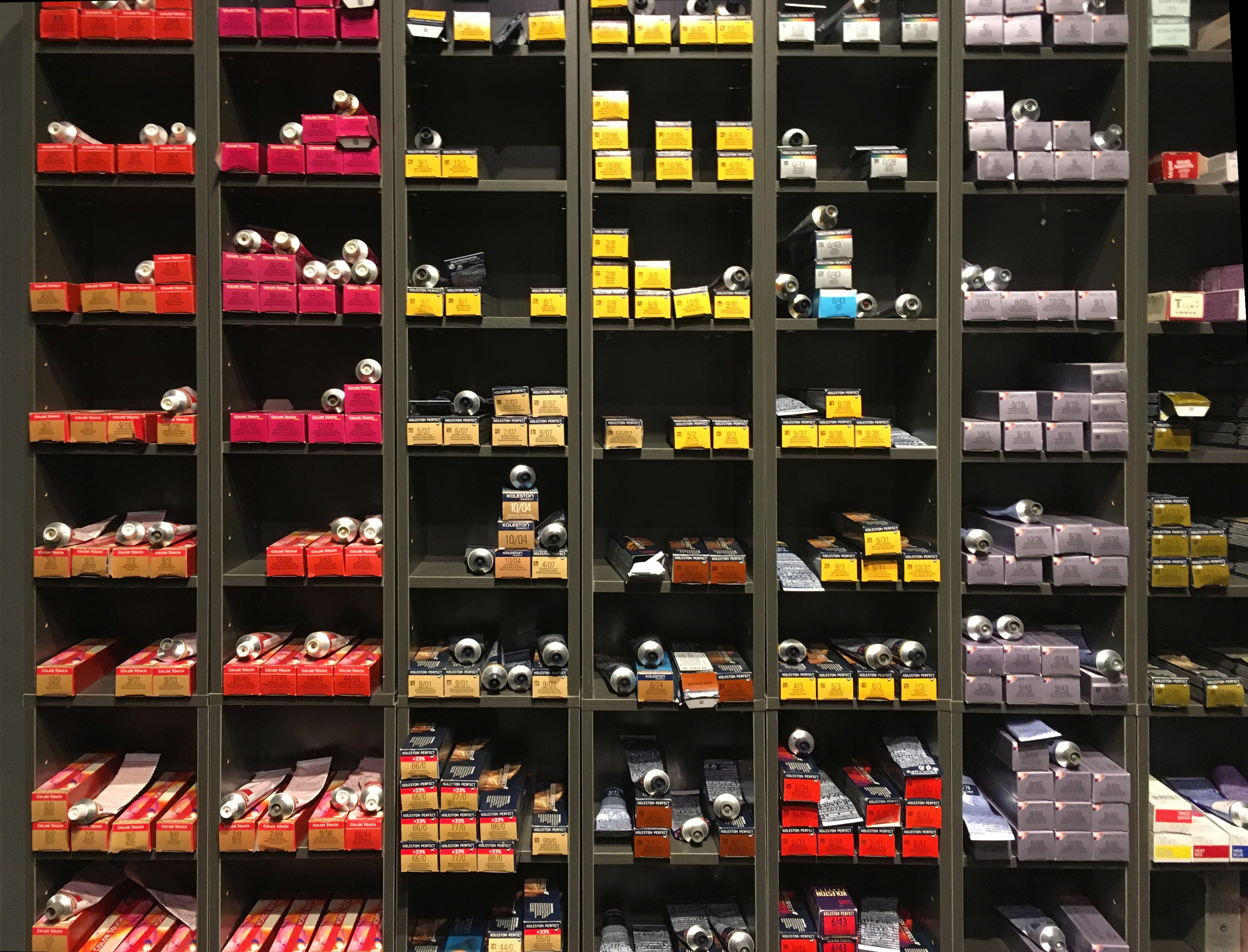
A wooden shelf with a great number of different hair colours in a hairdresser shop in Germany

A shelf (pl.: shelves) is a flat, horizontal or sloping plane used for items that are displayed or stored in a home, business, store, or elsewhere. It is raised off the floor and often anchored to a wall, supported on its shorter length sides by brackets, or otherwise anchored to cabinetry by brackets, dowels, screws, or nails. It can also be held up by columns or pillars. A shelf is also known as a counter, ledge, mantel, or rack. Tables designed to be placed against a wall, possibly mounted, are known as console tables, and are similar to individual shelves.

== Etymology ==
The word shelf originates in late 14th century Middle English. The word is from the Old English scylfe; similar to Low German schelf meaning shelf and Old Norse -skjalf meaning bench. It also could have come from skylfe, referring to a ledge or deck of a ship.

It's mostly agreed that the word shelf was adapted from the Proto-Germanic skelf which meant "split", possibly discussing the origins of splitting wood in order to create a shelf.

== Shaping and positioning ==
A shelf can be attached to a wall or other vertical surface, be suspended from a ceiling, be a part of a free-standing frame unit, or it can be part of a piece of furniture such as a cabinet, bookcase, entertainment center, headboard, and so on. Usually, two to six shelves make up a unit, each shelf being attached perpendicularly to the vertical or diagonal supports and positioned parallel one above the other. Free-standing shelves can be accessible from either one or both longer length sides. A shelf with hidden internal brackets is termed a floating shelf. A shelf or case designed to hold books is called a bookshelf.

The length of the shelf is based upon the space limitations of its siting and the amount of weight which it will be expected to hold. The vertical distance between the shelves is based upon the space limitations of the unit's siting and the height of the objects; adjustable shelving systems allow the vertical distance to be altered. The unit can be fixed or be some form of mobile shelving. The most heavy-duty shelving is pallet racking. In a store, the front edge of the shelf under the object(s) held might be used to display the name, product number, pricing, and other information about the object(s).

Sloping shelves help to make the contents of a shelf more visible.

== Materials ==
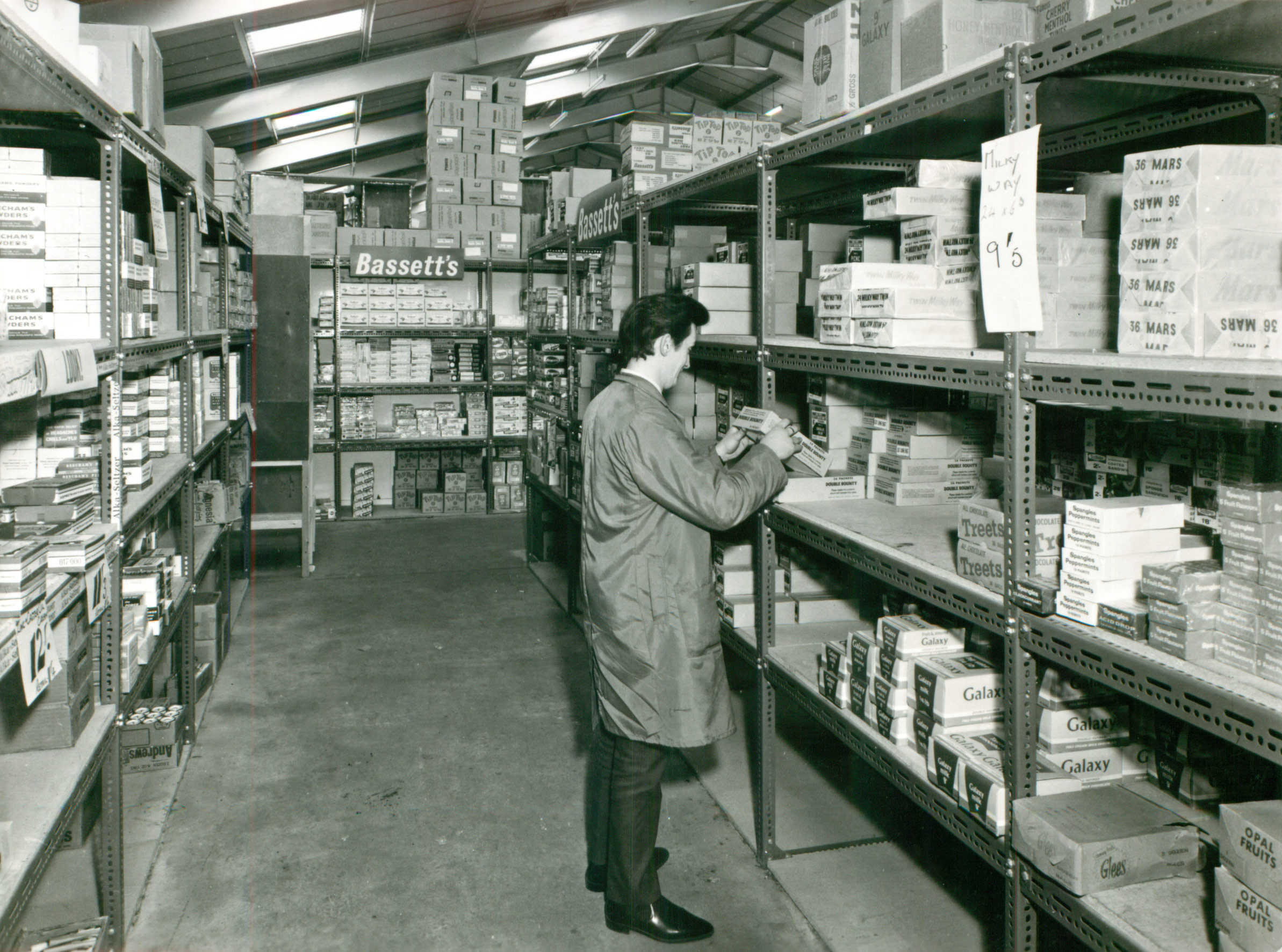
Adjustable shelving made from Dexion steel slotted angle

Shelves are normally made of strong materials such as wood, bamboo or steel, though shelves to hold lighter-weight objects can be made of glass or plastic. Do it yourself (DIY) shelves can be made from things such as an old door, colored pencils or books. Additionally, shelves can also be 3D printed, allowing do it yourself (DIY) projects to have intricate detail.

== Pipe shelving ==
Pipe shelving can be used in a home, business, store or restaurant. It generally consists mainly of wood boards resting on black or galvanized steel gas pipe. Copper pipe can be used but it is not recommended for heavy-duty shelves. Pipe shelving can also be modified to be used as retail clothing displays and wall shelves. Pipe shelving supports rest on the floor with floor flanges (these need not be attached) and attaches to the wall with flanges that are directed backwards. Many different designs exist and some companies make these shelves for commercial and residential applications and others make these shelves as DIY projects.

Pipe shelving is mainly attached to a wall but some companies have designed free standing units. Pipe shelving has even been used in reclamation projects such as shipping container architecture and was used by Marriott Hotels & Resorts in a bar project.

== Proportions for hanging on a wall ==
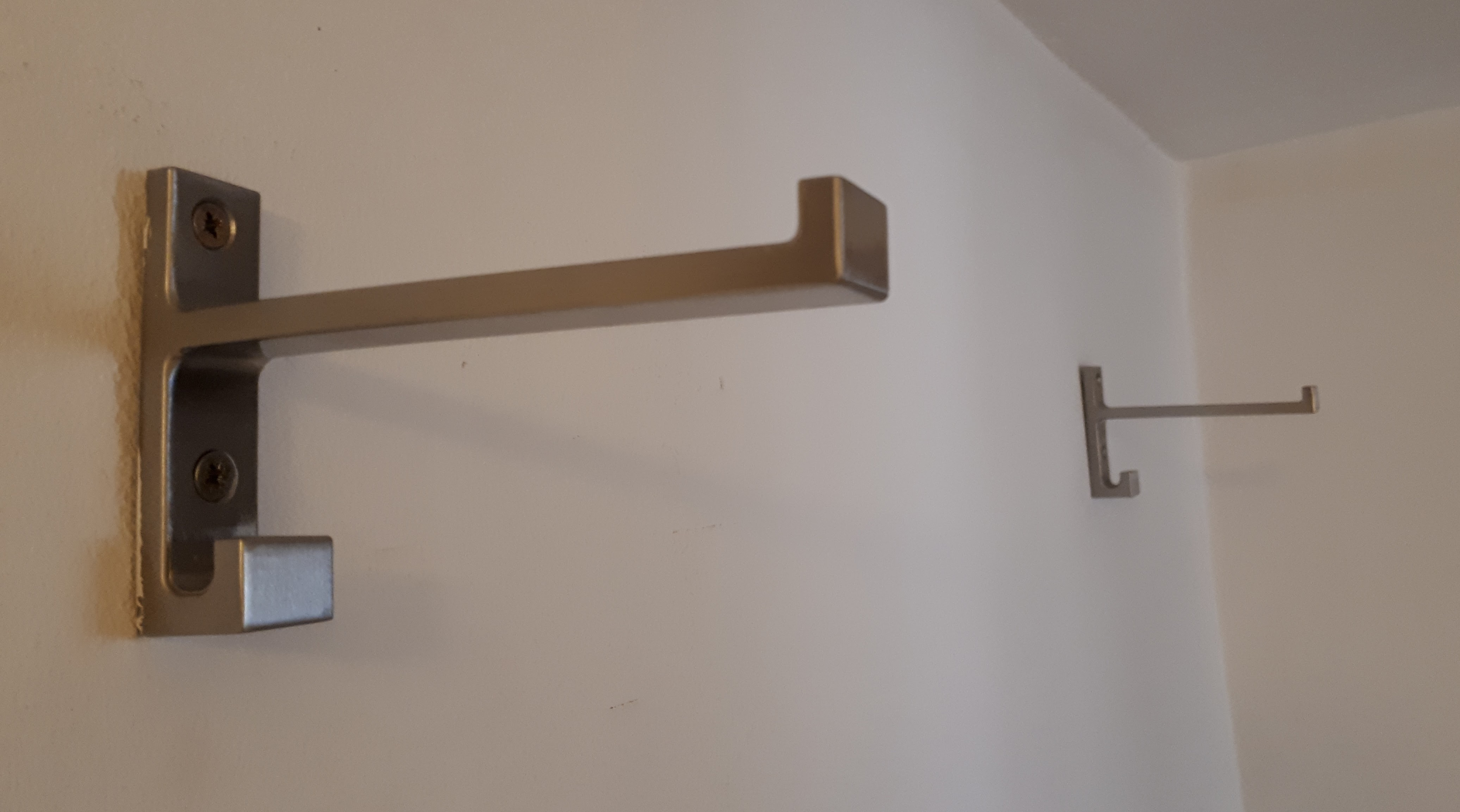
Two stainless steel shelf supports placed relatively far apart.

When hanging shelves on a wall, home designers generally try to ensure that the shelf should be no wider than 1.4 x bracket's width and no wider than 1.2 x bracket's height. Spacing brackets for a long shelf should be no more than 4 x shelf-breadth between each bracket - this holds true for normal materials used at home.

Length and size of screws holding the shelf to the wall differ depending on the material of the wall. A good rule of thumb for concrete walls is that the screw should go into the wall at least as far as one-tenth the width of the shelf. But there are shelf systems where a brace is hung on the wall, onto which brackets are attached without screws.

== See also ==
- Wire shelving
