= Floating shelf =

Style of furniture shelf

Diagram of floating shelf from the side.

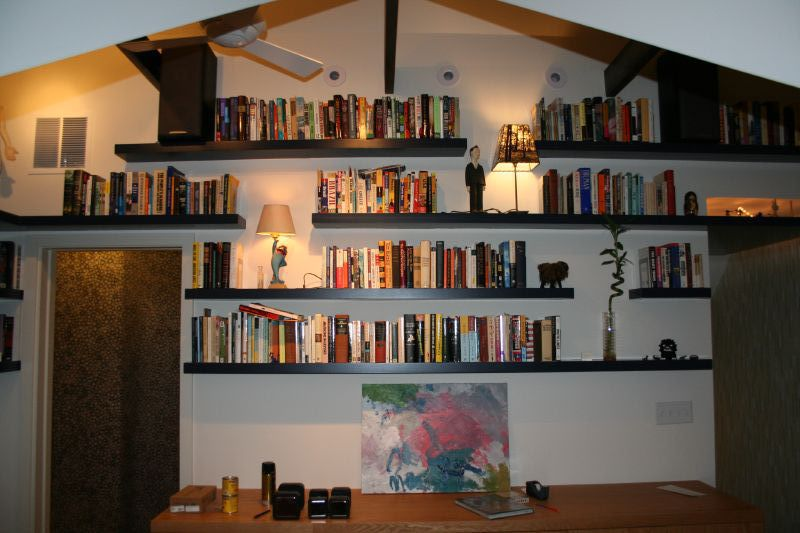
A room with a wall decorated with floating shelves.

A floating shelf is a form of shelf with its wall fixings hidden within the shelf board, with no visible supporting brackets.

== History ==
It is believed that the contemporary designer Magnus McCormick invented the term floating shelf in the late 1950s, but it is unclear if he was the first to use them.

== Use ==
Floating shelves are a good fit for a contemporary minimalist style interior. They can be used to expand storage space, atop a radiator to double as storage, as overhead storage, or inside a hallway to double as a console table.

== Technical description ==
A floating shelf can be supported on hidden rods or bars that have been attached to studs. A thick floating shelf may be made of a hollow-core shelf glued to a cleat. A floating shelf may have two or more channels open from the back towards, but without reaching, the front, into which slide fasteners attached to the wall, typically held in place by screws inserted through the bottom of the shelf. Depending on the thickness of the floating shelf t-brackets can occasionally be used. Named for their distinctive 'T' shape, t-brackets distribute the weight of the shelf and fit securely within drilled holes with the aid of an anchor to provide additional support. There are also corner shelves, which may use different supports to make them "float."

== Weight limitations ==
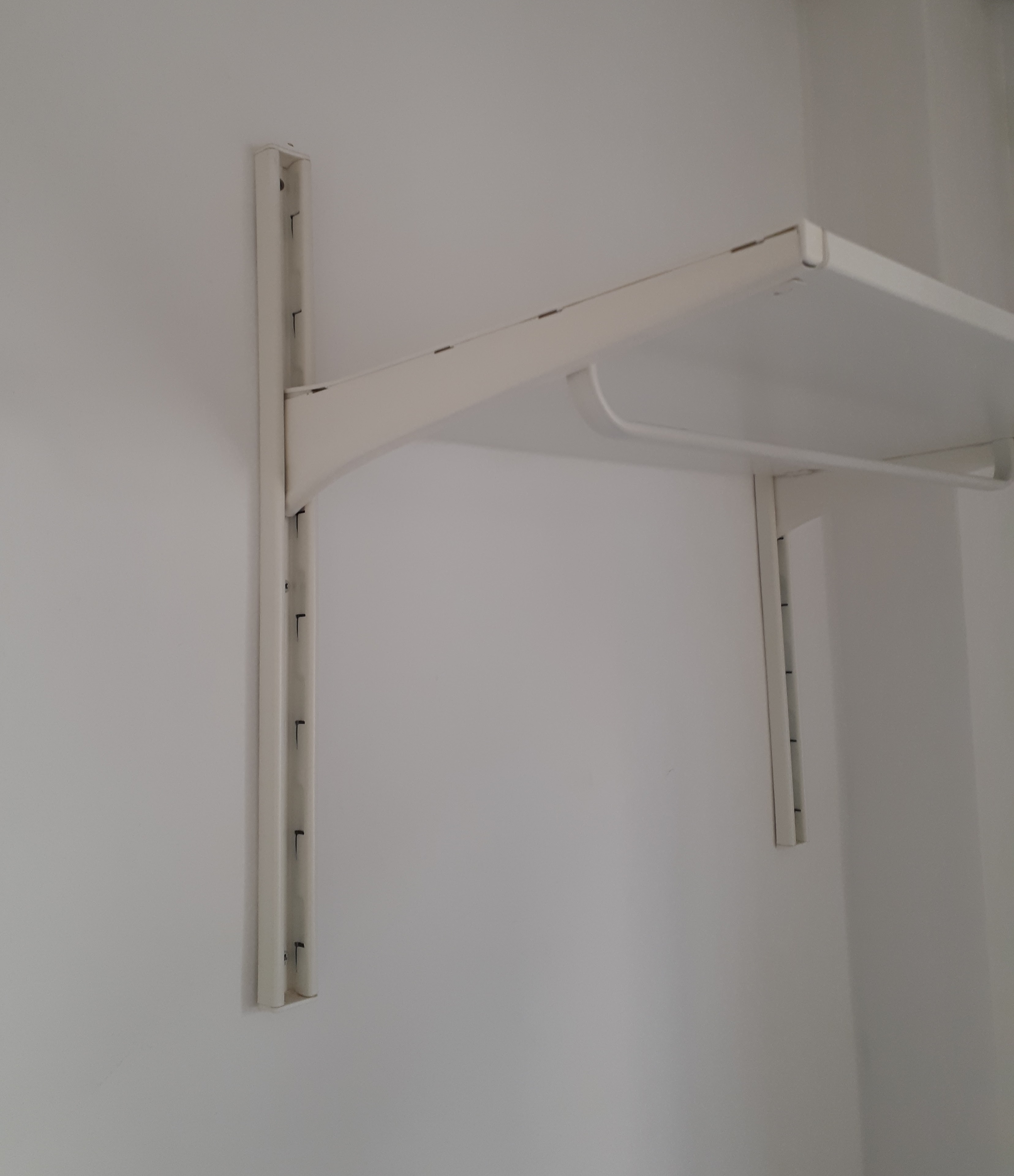
Wall-fixed adjustable shelving where the shelf brackets hang from vertical standards can enable higher loads

Floating shelves are often not suitable for carrying heavy loads, since the short vertical distance between their fixing points towards the wall gives a relatively large torque from the shelf loading compared to the holding power of the screws against the wall. As an example, one supplier of typical floating shelf supports suggests that floating brackets with a diameter of 12 mm can support a shelf at least 22 mm thick loaded with (a relatively modest) 20 kg, and 18 mm brackets can support 30 kg on a 28 mm shelf.

== See also ==
- Adjustable shelving
- French cleat, modular way of securing objects to a wall, e.g. for adjustable floating shelving
