= French cleat =

Molding used to secure an object to a wall

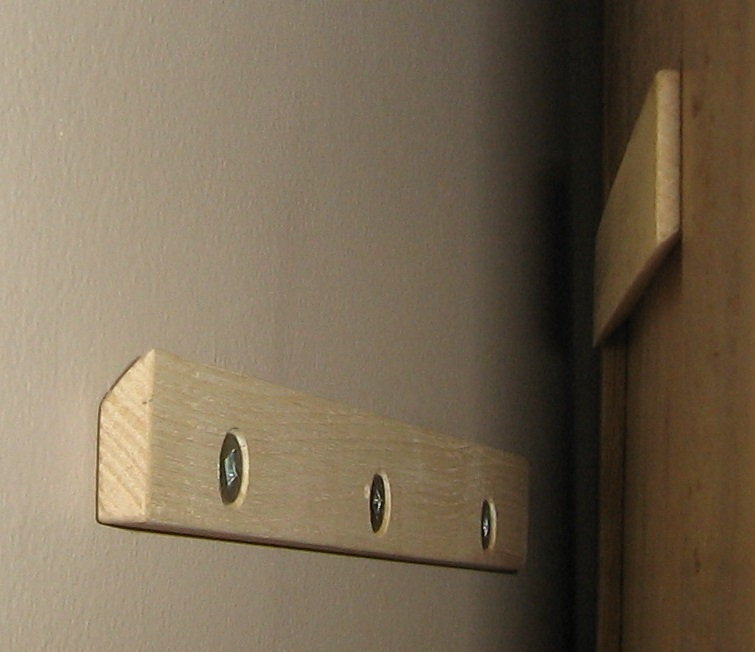
French cleat on a wall (left) and correspondingly on a shelf to be hung up (right)

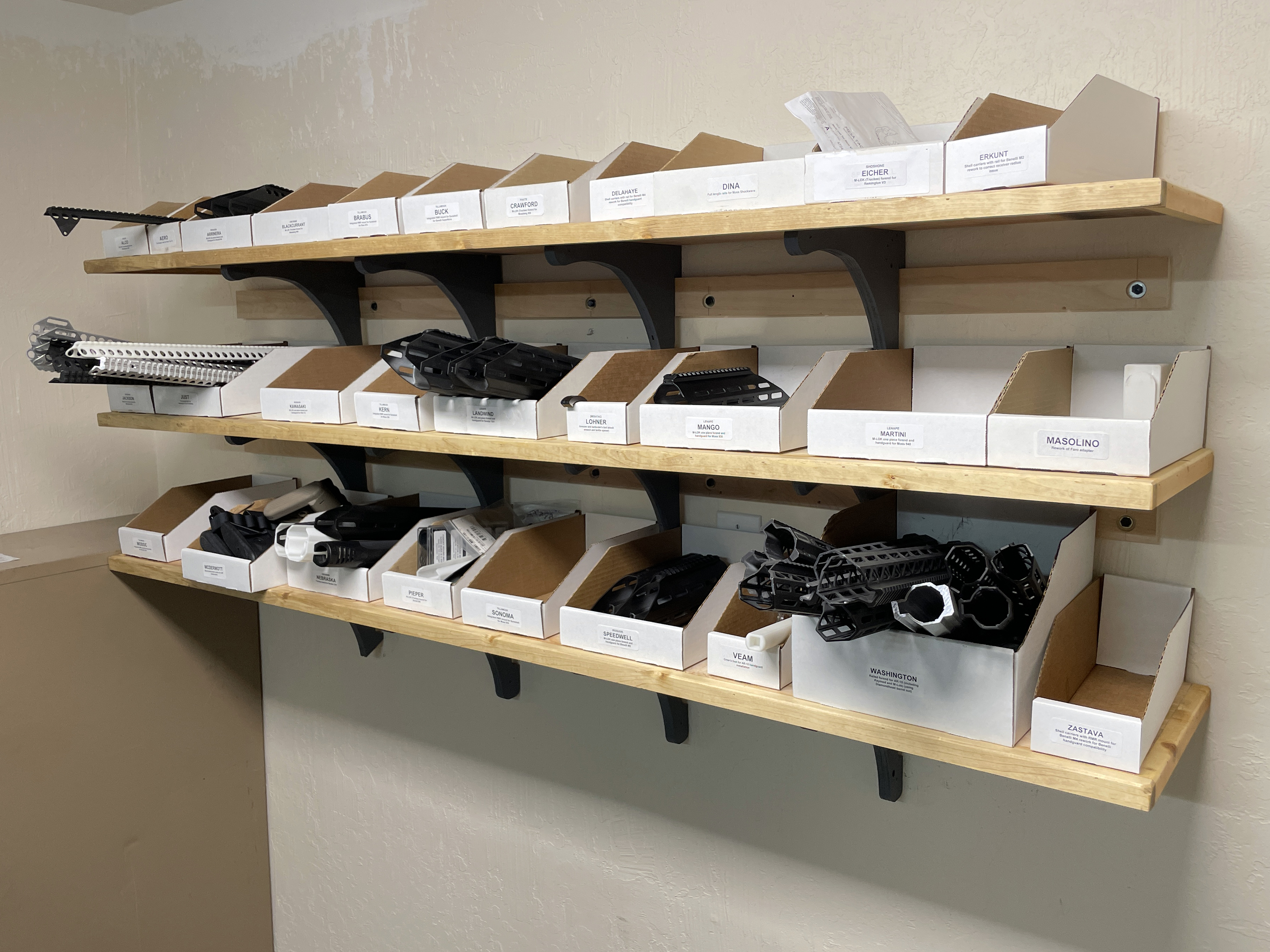
Shelves using french cleat

A French cleat is a way of securing a cabinet, mirror, tools, artwork or other objects to a wall. It is a molding with a 45 degree slope used to hang cabinets or other objects. The method has been described as simple and strong, but also elegant since it often can be mounted hidden behind a cabinet.

French cleats can be used in pairs, or with a cleat mounted to the wall and a matching edge cut into the object to be hung.

The wall side of a French cleat can be mounted securely without having to hold the full weight of the cabinet while it is secured. The cleat will not be seen while in use, so it does not matter where it is drilled; this means that it can be screwed into wall studs relatively independent of the lateral position of the cabinet. The cleat can be the full length of the cabinet, so it allows supporting the cabinet at least at every stud behind it. If the wall cleat is left slightly shorter than the cabinet, the cabinet can be shifted left and right slightly after it is hung, for perfect positioning.

Once the cleat is secured to the wall, the cabinet can be simply lifted onto it. Because no fine maneuvering is required, even a relatively heavy cabinet can be hung easily this way.

The bottom of the cabinet can be secured to the wall to be sure that it will not get pushed off the cleat while in use.

French cleats are sometimes used for making homemade tool boards, or for adjustable shelving, including wall-mounted shelves using hanging rails. This provides a modular setup with a layout that can be changed easily.

== See also ==
- Floating shelf
