= Pallet rack mover =

A pallet rack mover is a device that makes it possible to move pallet racks without demo or the re-assembly of the storage system. They are designed to move the entire rack assembly as one unit rather than individual pieces, saving valuable labor costs.

Pallet rack movers are typically separated into different classes depending on the weight capacity of the mover. Regular or light duty movers are made from a variety of materials such as formed plastic or steel with light to medium duty caster. Light duty movers have a weight capacity reaching 5,000 lbs. per mover. In contrast, the heavy duty movers weight capacity reaches 12,000 lbs. and are made of steel and heavy duty casters.

This moving system uses half the labor required to move any storage system from point A to point B within a warehouse or distribution center. Facility downtime is also reduce dramatically when using pallet rack movers by moving the storage system still loaded with the stored material or product.
