= Dexion Absolute =

Dexion Absolute Limited (LSE: DAB) was a Guernsey-registered, closed-ended investment company listed on the London Stock Exchange. It was managed by Dexion Capital and the chairman was John Hallam.

== History ==
The company was established by the hedge fund manager, Robin Bowie, with the intention of introducing hedge funds to financial institutions, in December 2002. By February 2006, it had £530m of assets under management and it had become the largest listed fund of hedge funds. However, in May 2009, after the board faced a vote on whether to continue, most of the shareholders decided not to invest more money in the company. Accordingly, in February 2016, the board decided to wind up the company.
