= Wire shelving =

Wire Shelving is commonly used in industrial and commercial platforms, and more recently in residential use. It is also known as wire decking or ventilated shelving.

== Features ==
Wire decking consists of wire mesh supported by metal supports and is intended to be load-bearing. The mesh is usually welded to the supports, but may be attached in other ways as well. In commercial and industrial applications, the wire mesh usually has a minimum wire gauge of 0.105 inches when round wire is used. The most common shelf size is 42 inches deep by 46 inches wide, while two such shelves placed side-by-side can usually be combined to allow for a single shelf of 8 feet wide. The weight capacity of a 42x46 shelf ranges from 2,000 to 3,500 pounds, while the decking itself weighs from 24 to 30 pounds. The finish on the steel may either be painted or sprayed on, or be electroplated with zinc. Electroplating is more common with Chinese manufacturers while painting or spraying is more common with American manufacturers.

Wire shelving is used in a broad range of commercial and home applications. It is often used in restaurant, food service and retail store applications due to its ability to stay clean and resist rust and mold. It is also used by retailers, in industrial applications and in home kitchens as well. Wire shelving is excellent in areas where fire prevention is stressed because its open design allows sprinkler systems to function where solid shelving might block water flow.

Chrome-plated steel is much cheaper and much less rust resistant to scratches. Typical colors are chrome, white and black.

== Manufacturing ==
Wire shelving for industrial use consists of steel wire, used for the decking, and steel sheets, used for the supports. The wire makes up about 60% of the weight and the sheet steel about 40%.

Coiled steel wire is cut to the correct lengths required using straight-cut machines. Then, these individual wires are fed through a welding machine that joins them, using electric-resistance welding at each junction. The creates a continuous wire mesh, which is then cut to the lengths required.

Manufacturers receive sheets of steel pre-cut for the widths required. The sheets are fed through a roll-forming or stamping machine to create a "U" or "V" shape. The roll-forming machine also cuts the supports to the length required. The "U" shape is significantly stronger and superior to the "V" shape.

After welding, the decking is coated with either baked-on enamel or baked-on powder coating. This requires a cleaning process, heat drying, cooling, paint dip, and then final curing. The decking can instead be electroplated with zinc.

Most manufacturers use the same equipment to produce other products. These include concrete reinforcement, mining, containers and other items made from steel mesh

== Market ==
In 2008, eleven firms in the United States produced comprised 99% of that country's industry. Most US manufacturers sell wire decking nationwide. Manufacturers usually sell to distributors rather than directly to customers, with big-box retail being a large buyer. Walmart was the number one purchaser for several years during the 2000s. Both US and Chinese firms had high levels of excess capacity around 2010, allowing them to quickly respond to potential increases in demand. Manufacturers reported that the product had changed very little in the previous decade.

There is no predictable business cycle in the wire decking industry. Demand closely tracks industrial output and real estate construction, but with a 6 to 9-month delay. As a result, the wire decking industry didn't feel the effects of the Great Recession until well into 2009.

The industry has developed a quality certification called "R-Mark."

Many manufacturers, especially those importing from Asia do not adhere to the R-Mark standards. This allows them to sell lighter products with arbitrary capacity ratings which can pose a great safety risk.

In the 2000s, US producers accused China of subsidizing wire decking and unfair trade practices. A US Trade Commission investigation rejected these allegations.

== Incompatible standards and labeling ==
However, not all pole diameters and shelf widths in use are the same. The various plastic connectors are not interchangeable among manufacturers. Many use proprietary designs that do not fit with the systems of other makers. This variance tends to make it difficult to mix and match various brands of shelving.
