= Sanctuary of Amynus =

- ἱερὸν τοῦ Ἀμύνου
- Location within Athens

General information
- Type: Temple
- Architectural style: Classical Greek
- Location: Athens, Greece
- Coordinates: 37.971340°N 23.721580°E
- Completed: 6th century BC

The Sanctuary of Amynus (Ancient Greek: ἱερὸν τοῦ Ἀμύνου) or Amyneion, later the sanctuary of Amynus and Asclepius (ἱερὸν τοῦ Ἀμύνου καὶ Ἀσκληπιοῦ) was a healing shrine in ancient Athens, located to the west of the Acropolis, which was active from the sixth century BC or earlier into Late Antiquity. It was dedicated to the hero Amynus, who was later joined by Asclepius and Hygieia. The sanctuary consisted of a roughly rectangular courtyard with a small shrine, a fountain and basin of healing water, and many votive offerings. It was excavated by Wilhelm Dörpfeld in 1892 and 1895.

== Description ==
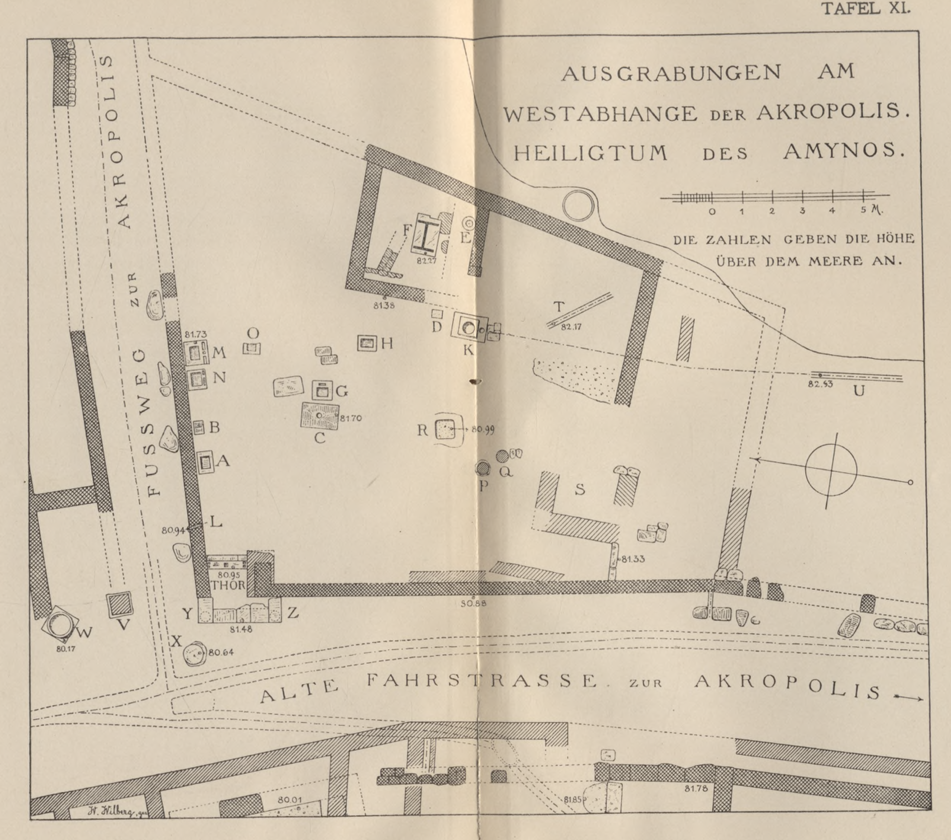
Plan of the sanctuary, following excavations of 1896.

The sanctuary is located to the west of the Acropolis in Athens at a crossroads. To the west is the main road from the Pnyx to the gateway of the Acropolis, the stenopos Kollytos which runs north-south at this point. To the north is a narrow alleyway which runs east-west in order to take a more direct route up to the Acropolis. The sanctuary itself is an irregular quadrilateral courtyard, about 19 m long and 13 m wide, with an internal area of about 250 m^{2}. This compound is surrounded by a polygonal peribolos wall made of hard, blue limestone quarried from the immediate area. The foundations of the western wall were found totally intact and survives in places to a height of 1 m. The foundations of the western portion of the north wall were also intact, but the rest of the north wall and the east wall survived only in traces. The south wall is largely unexplored. Large stones (up to 1.4 m long) were used for the western wall fronting the main road, while the stones on the north side are smaller. Stylistic parallels with the triangular Dionysion to the north and the shrine of the Tritopatores in the Kerameikos suggest that these walls date to the second half of the fifth century BC.

The gate to the compound is located at the northwest corner. It was originally a simple double door with a small, simple porch in front and no columns, all made from poros. This was 1.31 m wide according to Dörpfeld (equivalent to = 4 Attic feet), or 1.25 according to Riethmüller. Pottery found under the foundations indicates a sixth-century BC date. In the Roman period, a raised propylon of blue marble was built, supported by two columns, which helped manage the rising level of the road (Y-Z on the plan at right). There is a round stone plate outside and slightly north of the entrance, which may have supported the base of a perirrhanterion (water basin for ritual purification), and the base for an inscribed stele just to the south.

There was a small structure on the east side of the precinct, measuring about c. 3.5 metres north-south and 3.3 east-west. This is known from traces of the foundations only. Dörpfeld reconstructed a simple building with no front porch and a simple entrance at the southwestern corner, which was rebuilt several times. Riethmüller argues that the north-south length of this structure has been over-estimated by 1.5 metres; John Travlos questioned whether this structure was even roofed. Within this space, the bottom part of a table for offerings survived (F on the plan). It had lion's feet at each corner and a footplate between them decorated with a relief depiction of a pair of snakes, which now survives only on the northern side. A round base for a stele or column (E) was also found inside the temple.

In front of the temple was a fountainhead (K), which was 4.1 m deep, made of poros and lined with slate. This fed a pool of water (R) in the centre of the precinct. This water would have been used as part of healing rituals. The water may have originally entered the sanctuary from the south in a clay pipe of the same type as the Peisistratid aqueduct, dating to the third quarter of the sixth century BC, but this is not certain. Later, it was fed by a pipe that approaches from the southeast (T). The water left the sanctuary through a drain running under the north wall 1.5 metres from the western end (L). As of 1896, water still flowed into the fountain.

Several bases for votive statues, relief plaques, and inscribed stelae were found throughout the precinct (A-D, G-H, M-N). There are remnants of marble plaques still embedded in G, M, and N. The large poros base (C) in the north central part of the sanctuary, which measures 1.225 c 0.825 m, may have been the altar.

Travlos thought that some bases found within the sanctuary might have supported wooden columns for a stoa along one of the walls of the compound, but this has been doubted by other scholars.

=== Finds ===
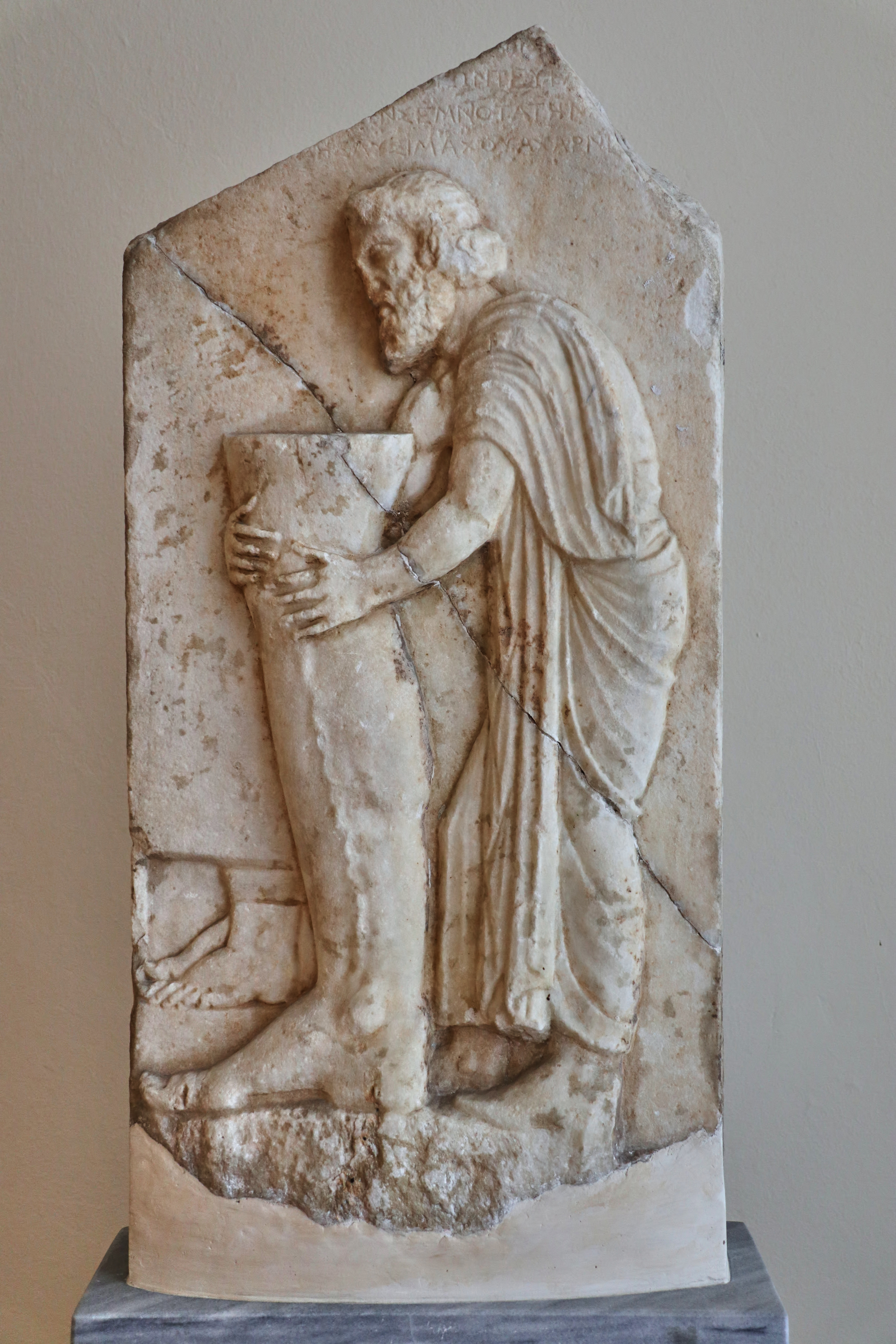
Votive plaque showing a man with an anatomical votive of a leg.

Several votive reliefs were found leaning against the north wall, some of which are inscribed with dedications to Amynus and Asclepius. The most striking of these reliefs depicts a bearded man carrying an enormous disembodied leg with a pronounced varicose vein, which he is dedicating in the sanctuary as an anatomical votive. Other reliefs depict worshippers approaching Hygieia, a hero feasting, a bearded snake, and anatomical votives of female breasts, ears, and male genitals. Most of these date to the fourth century BC. Inscribed stelae were found, reused in the fountain, which reveal details about the administration of the sanctuary.

Sculptures found in the sanctuary include an archaic terracotta figurine of an enthroned goddess, an archaic herm of Dionysus, a Roman-period marble statuette of a goddess, a statuette of Cybele enthroned with a lion at her feet, and a blue marble statuette of Telesphorus of Roman date. A marble hand holding a bowl derives from a full-size sculpture of a female figure, probably Hygieia, the personification of health.

Pottery finds include geometric, early attic, proto-Corinthian, and black-figure styles. One of the black-figure items is a small Panathenaic amphora. There is a bowl dedicated to Ascelpius and the foot of a kylix cup dedicated by one Schenales.

== History ==
The waterpipe and the age of neighbouring structures indicate that the sanctuary achieved its present dimensions in the 6th century BC under Peisistratus. The pottery finds include geometric pottery, indicating activity on the site going back to the eighth century BC. Amynus was the original healing hero of the sanctuary. His name derives from the Greek word amyno (ἀμύνω), meaning 'to ward off' and is linked to Apollo's epithet Amyntor, which is associated with his role as a healing deity. In the fourth century BC, the god Asclepius was introduced as a second object of worship in the sanctuary. He was a healing deity from Epidaurus, who was introduced to Athens in 420/19 BC and had his main shrine at the Asclepieion on the south side of the Acropolis. Two inscriptions reveal that the site was managed in the fourth century BC by the orgeones of Amynus, Asclepius, and Dexion. Dexion ("receiver"), who had a separate sanctuary according to these inscriptions, was the tragedian Sophocles, who was heroicised after his death for his role in the introduction of the cult of Asclepius to Athens. Körte suggested that he had done this as priest of Amynus.

The last inscriptions found in the sanctuary date to the first century AD. At some point in the Roman period, the gate was renovated to make it more impressive and to deal with the rising street level. The sanctuary remained clear of other construction into Late Antiquity.

The sanctuary was first discovered by Wilhelm Dörpfeld in 1892, during exploratory work in search of the Enneakrounos fountain. He returned to the site to conduct full excavations in early 1895. This work was published in two articles by Alfred Körte in 1893 and 1896 with sketches by Wilhelm Wilberg. The finds from the sanctuary were deposited in the National Archaeological Museum, Athens, but are now partially lost.

== Bibliography ==
- Körte, A. (1893). "Bezirk eines Heilgottes". Mitteilungen des Deutschen Archäologischen Instituts, Athenische Abteilung. 18: 231–256.
- Körte, A. (1896). "Die Ausgrabungen am Westabhange der Akropolis: IV. Das Heiligtum des Amynos". Mitteilungen des Deutschen Archäologischen Instituts, Athenische Abteilung. 21: 287–332.
- Riethmüller, Jürgen W. (2005). Asklepios: Heiligtümer und Kulte. Heidelberg: Verlag Archäologie und Geschichte. pp. II, 12–17. ISBN 3935289308.
- Carando, L.; Longo, F. (2010). "L'Amyneion". In Greco, Emanuele (ed.). Topografia di Atene: sviluppo urbano e monumenti dalle origini al III secolo d. C.: Tomo 1: Acropoli - Areopago - Tra Acropoli e Pnice. Atene Paestum (Salerno): Scuola archeologica italiana Pandemos. pp. 265–267. ISBN 88-87744-34-3.
