= Dexion =

Engineering company

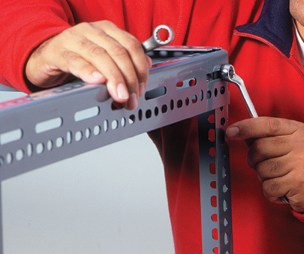
Slotted Angle assembly

Dexion is a company name and brand particularly associated with the development of the "Dexion" slotted angle steel strip construction system, widely used since the 1950s for domestic and commercial shelving, storage racking, exhibition stands and accommodation purposes.

The original UK-based Dexion Ltd manufacturing company spawned several subsidiaries before eventually ceasing trading in 2003. Its bankruptcy saw the start of a long-running pension dispute with former workers.

In 2018, the parent company Constructor Group AS was taken over by Gonvarri Material Handling, a subsidiary of Gonvarri Industries. Dexion products are today manufactured in Europe at factories in Germany and Romania, part of a product portfolio including Constructor, Kasten, Kredit and Almaceno.

Dexion (Australia) Pty Ltd, spun off as a separate company in 2003 and is now known as Dexion Asia Pacific. The group continues to trade successfully in the APAC region, covering Australasian and Asian markets with a purpose-built manufacturing facility and corporate office in Malaysia.

== History ==
=== Formation ===
Dexion Ltd (from the Greek for 'right') was established in 1937 in London by Australia-born engineer and printer Demetrius Comino, originally to deliver printing-related products. In solving problems within his printing business, Comino patented several products to improve efficiency in the printing process. However, his dissatisfaction with the poor versatility of traditional wooden shelving used to store paper and other materials led him to experiment with steel strips to devise a reusable shelving system. In 1939 he commissioned Birmingham-based Accles & Pollock to manufacture an initial batch of angled sections made of steel with slots cut down one side and a long groove cut down the other. The Second World War delayed further development of the product until 1947 when Comino was finally able to finance and open a small factory in Chingford, north-east London.

=== Growth of business ===
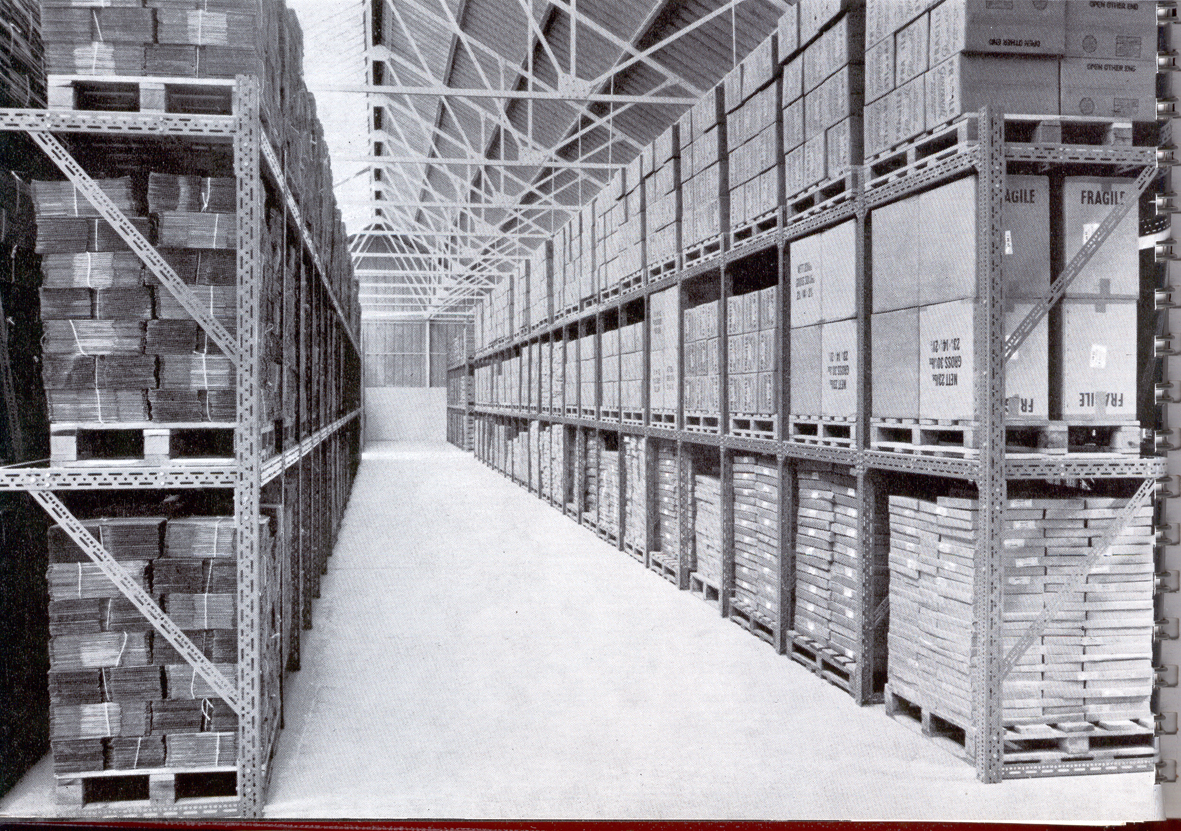
Slotted Angle storage system

After initially disappointing sales, production increased to 50,000 feet per week in 1949, generating a business turnover of £500,000 that year. In 1950, production of Dexion strip reached 125,000 ft/week, and a new Dexion factory was opened in Enfield.

Despite patent constraints and competition from rival manufacturers producing similar products, Dexion Ltd grew rapidly. By 1956, the company's turnover exceeded £2m, it employed 500 UK workers in three UK factories, and had a further 200 employees in Australia, Belgium and Canada, plus licencees in France, Chile, Spain, Argentina and the United States.

Following the 1953 Ionian earthquake in Greece, Dexion donated 20,000 feet of its product for new housing (a prototype house was designed within three weeks). "Operation Ulysses" attracted worldwide attention, including an article in Time magazine and British Pathe newsreels.

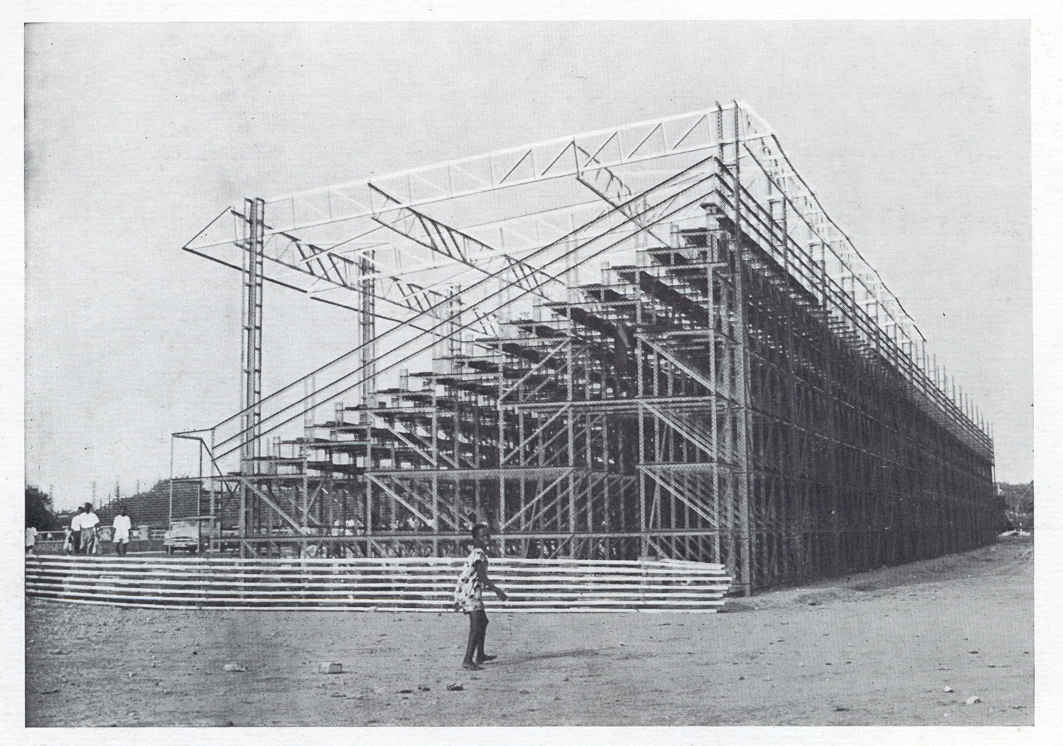
Slotted angle used in Ghana stadium, 1957.

The main scoreboard and television platform at the 1956 Winter Olympics' ski stadium at Cortina d'Ampezzo was constructed from Dexion, and Ghana's independence celebrations in 1957 involved grandstands for 10,000 people, six miles of crush barriers and 500 bunting poles – all made of Dexion. The company's turnover grew from £2.5m in 1958 to £5.7m in 1962.

In 1963, Dexion again supported earthquake disaster relief work, following the 1963 Skopje earthquake, providing building frame materials to enable 49 Royal Engineers to build 1560 dwellings, enough for two complete villages, one of which was nicknamed Dexiongrad.

In addition to the slotted angle product, Dexion developed other systems. Antony Barrington Brown (well known as a photographer and explorer) joined Dexion in the mid-1950s and devised Speedframe: square-section metal tubes which could be quickly fitted together to assemble tables and benches; the system made over £100 million over the next decade.

=== Flotation and acquisition ===
In 1968, the company was floated on the London Stock Exchange, in one of the three largest issues that year, buoyed by results showing a 40% increase in world sales to £14m and a new record profit of £1.133m. A year later, turnover reached £21m, with profits rising to £1.5m. By this stage, over one million feet per week of Dexion slotted angle were being produced, and sales were increasingly focused on uses in warehousing and distribution. The Comino Foundation educational charity was established in 1971, financially supported by the proceeds of dividend income following Dexion's 1968 public flotation.

The recession of the early 1970s proved more challenging, and following two poor trading years, Dexion came to the attention of Chicago-based steel company Interlake Inc, and while an initial approach was rebuffed, the £9.4m sale eventually took place in October 1974, valuing Dexion at £4 million less than its 1968 flotation price. Comino, by this point Dexion's chairman, retired, though he retained a place on the company's board until 1978.

Under its new management, Dexion flourished for 20 years with sales reaching £200m by 1995. Interlake sold the Dexion businesses in December 1997 to the English investment company Apax Partners. In 1999, after clearing European anti-monopoly concerns, Apax and Norwegian industrial investment company Aker RGI merged their warehouse technologies and material handling units to form the Dexion Group Ltd (Apax) and Constructor AS (Aker); in 2000, the Dexion Group was acquired by Aker and merged with Constructor, while the Australia/Asia Pacific operations were sold. In 2007 Dexion generated a turnover of €70m and, as part of the Aker Material Handling group of companies, was sold to the Swedish finance investor Altor Equity Partners.

In January 2018, Constructor Group A/S (which in 2010 had a turnover of €100m from operations in 30 European countries) was acquired by Gonvarri Steel Services which, in March 2018, changed its name to Gonvarri Material Handling while continuing to market the Dexion, Kasten and Constructor product brands.

== Dexion pensions controversy ==
UK manufacture ceased in May 2003, when Dexion's UK businesses were placed into administration, a step that also triggered the automatic winding-up of the Dexion Group Pension and Assurance Scheme, jeopardising the occupational pensions of over 1750 members of its pension fund. This prompted widespread protests, with Dexion one of several examples cited by unions and MPs (including Michael Penning, MP for the Hemel Hempstead constituency where one of Dexion's main UK factories was located) campaigning against what they saw as the excesses of private equity investors.

== Dexion today ==
In Europe, Dexion products are manufactured and distributed by Gonvarri Material Handling Group. The business has operations in 50 countries working with over 30 different partners. Dexion and Constructor now manufactures solutions for automated warehouses.

Dexion-branded warehouse solutions continue to be marketed by Dexion Asia Pacific, trading successfully in Australia, New Zealand and Asia.
