= Mobile shelving =

Tall shelving cabinets on tracks

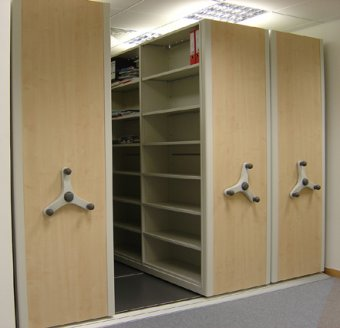
Small mobile aisle shelving / roller racking system

Mobile shelving (also called mobile aisle shelving, compactus, roller racking, or rolling stack) is a library stack, or another shelving or storage unit, fitted with wheeled traction systems. Units can be closely packed when access is not required, but can be readily moved to open up an aisle to allow access. By eliminating the need for a permanently open aisle between every unit, a smaller proportion of floor space can be allocated to storage than in the case of conventional fixed shelving, or a higher capacity of storage can be met using the same footprint as fixed shelving.

Each shelving unit is normally mounted on a level trackway (to eliminate gradients in the supporting floor), making it possible to move heavy units with minimal effort. Mobile shelving can be moved manually or by the use of electrical motors. The track/flooring can either sit on top of an existing floor or be integrated into raised access flooring allowing for a smooth transition between unit and surrounding floor levels.

== Manual mobile shelving ==
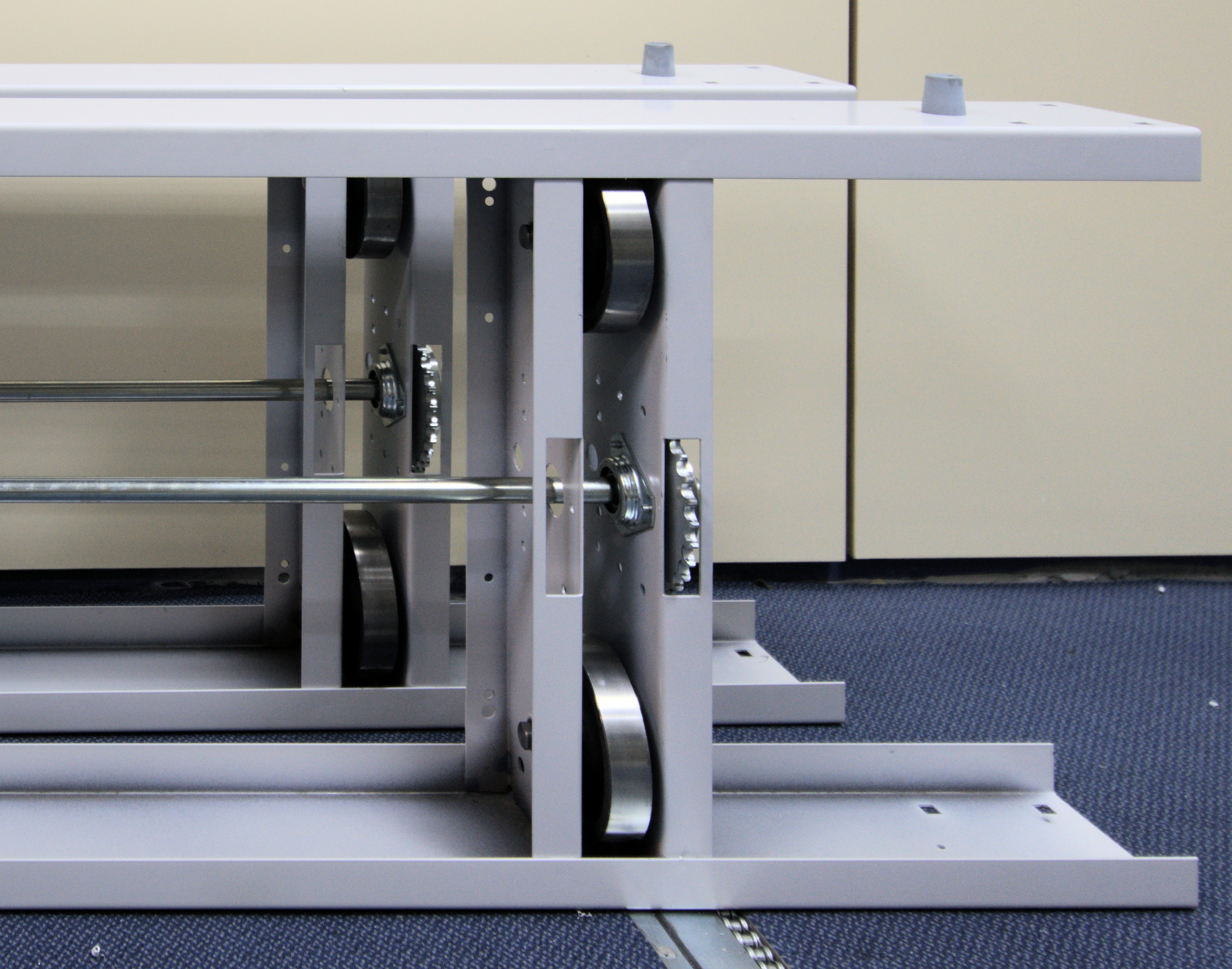
Detail of the mechanism of a mobile shelving track system

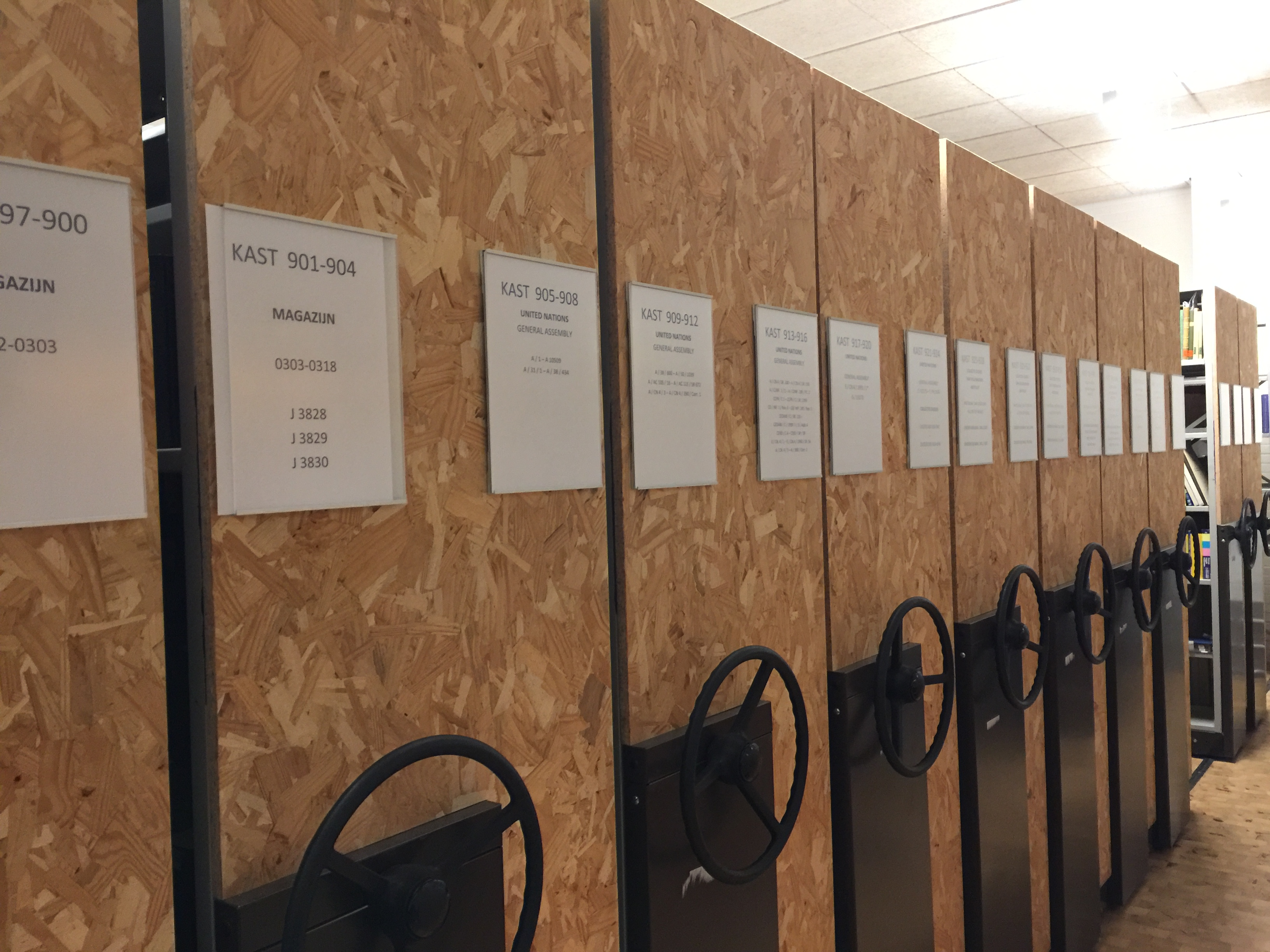
Manual mobile shelving (Leiden Law Library)

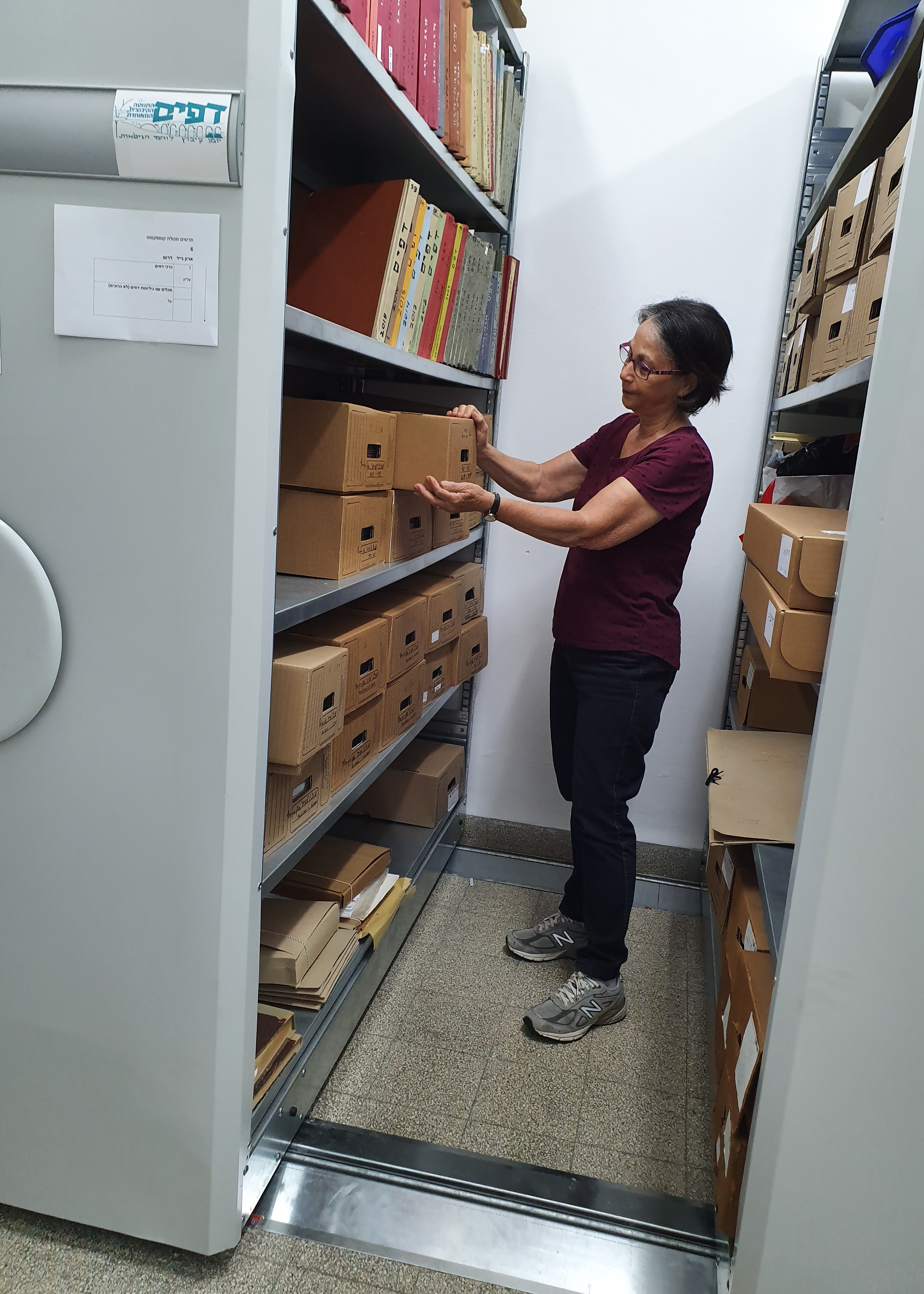
Archivist retrieves files from mobile storage rack at Kibbutz Lohamei HaGeta'ot, Israel

Mobile storage systems are usually constructed with a rotary handle on the exterior accessible face. When rotated, the handle operates the mechanism which winds the single, connected, filing unit either left or right, depending on a clockwise or counter-clockwise rotation of the handle. In an office, for example, several stacks of movable filing cabinets may be accommodated in a limited space.

Drive mechanisms vary; traditionally systems were offered with chain drive but modern technology allows belt drive systems which provides smooth, quiet operation.

Although the "bays of shelving" that sit on the mobile chassis come in many standard sizes, they can be mixed to create run lengths of shelving to maximise the room length.

The tracks can be installed onto many different types of floor and on different levels. The tracks themselves can either have a false floor running in between so that the tracks do not become trip hazards, or they can be put into the floor (usually concrete floor) or have small ramps on either side of the tracks. Either option creates a hazard-free floor and track system.

== Powered mobile shelving ==
Powered mobile shelving

Powered shelving is electrically powered. Units normally have a small AC or DC motor hidden in the base that automatically moves the units when a single button is pressed. High-end versions connect into archiving databases, and using RFID allows the easy retrieval of archived items with auto-open and close functions.

== Applications ==
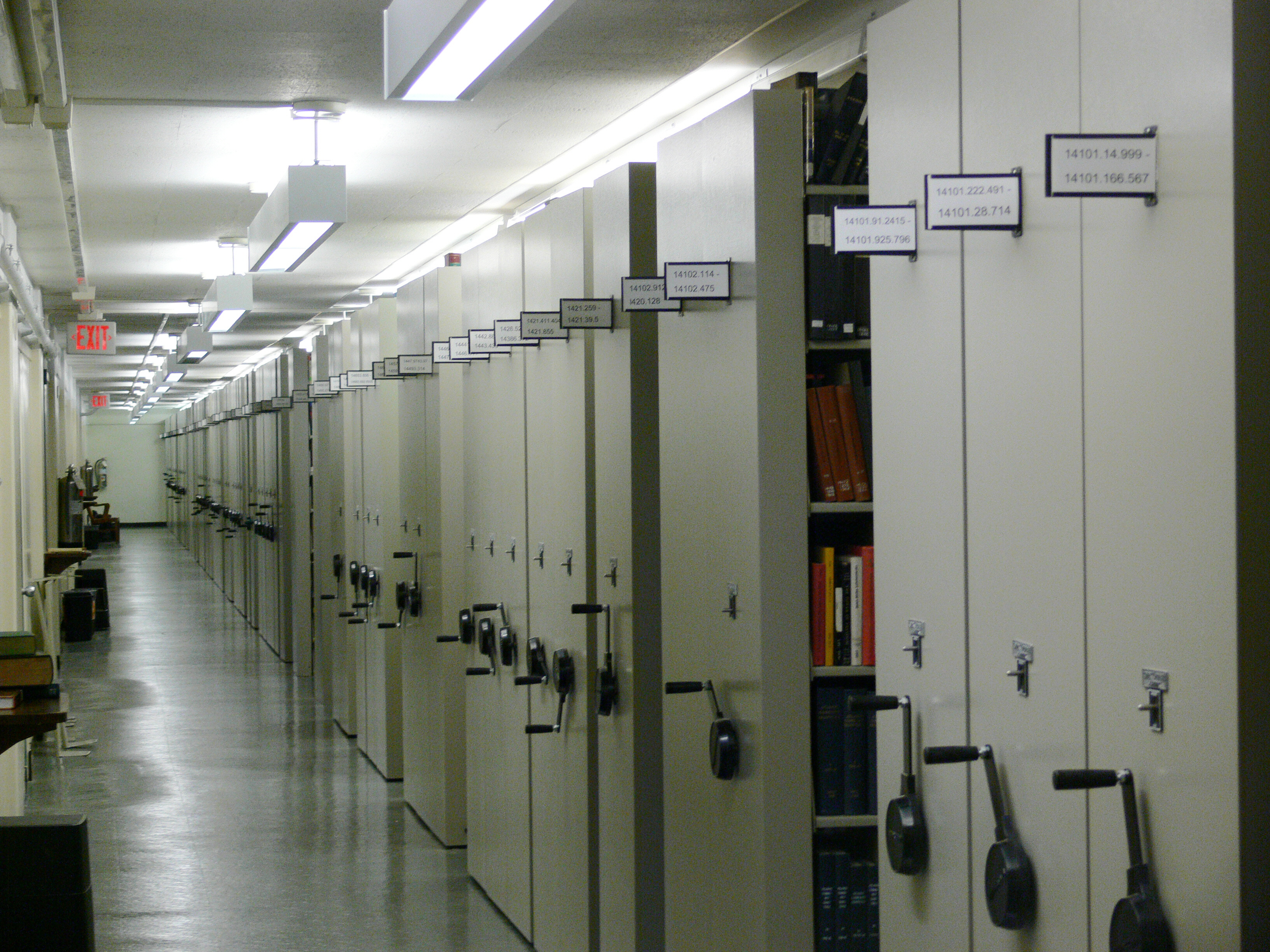
Princeton University's Firestone Library's mobile aisle shelving / roller racking system

Mobile aisle shelving is typically used for academic or commercial applications where a significant volume of physical archive material, filing or books is to be stored. These include medical or government records, file-intensive offices such as the legal or accountancy professions, and public and academic libraries and similar archives.

Another common use is in retail stockrooms to maximise the stock capacity, or to reduce the back of house storage space required so that a greater proportion of the overall shop space can be used for customer retail purposes.

=== Capacity, siting and speed advantages ===
A typical bank of mobile office shelving units offers close to a 50% reduction of floor space, or a 50% to 100% increase in storage space, compared to traditional filing cabinets. The ability to concertina individual units until touching means space is only required between units when they are being accessed by users. Applications with a greater number of simultaneous users may require more access spaces (aisles), thus not approaching this 50% target so closely.

When the bank of units is closed, the contents are protected from light and dust, and the whole bank of units can be secured by locking the end unit(s) in place. This makes mobile shelving ideal for holding museum and archive collections.
