= Slotted angle =

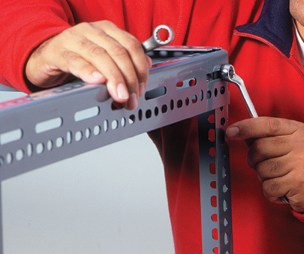
Slotted angle assembly

Slotted angle (also sometimes referred to as slotted angle iron) is a system of reusable metal strips used to construct shelving, frames, work benches, equipment stands and other structures. The name derives, first, from the use of elongated slots punched into the metal at uniform intervals to enable assembly of structures fixed with nuts and bolts, and second, from the longitudinal folding of the metal strips to form a right angle.

== Invention ==
Prototype slotted angle strips were developed by London-based engineer Demetrius Comino in the late 1930s, as he sought alternatives to conventional wooden shelving in his printing works. Comino owned an engineering business, Dexion Ltd, which began production in 1947 and the steel slotted angle strips eventually became known as Dexion.

The prior existence of Meccano prevented a generic patent so Dexion patents were restricted to particular slot and hole configurations, and, seeking to emulate Dexion's success, other UK and European companies began offering different sizes, hole patterns and metal strip thicknesses.

== Production ==
Steel remains the most commonly used slotted angle material, although aluminium alternatives are also available. The product is generally manufactured from sheet metal using machine presses to form the angle and to punch holes through the metal. The strips are normally produced in a variety of standard lengths, and steel versions are often painted or galvanized to protect them from rust.

== Construction ==
To construct items from slotted angle, items can be cut to size (some versions are marked to show the optimum points at which to cut the metal) using special slotted angle cutters or shears, and then fixed with nuts and bolts. Tension plates and other metal strips are also available to add strength to the finished structure.
