= Tom Sachs =

American artist (born 1966)

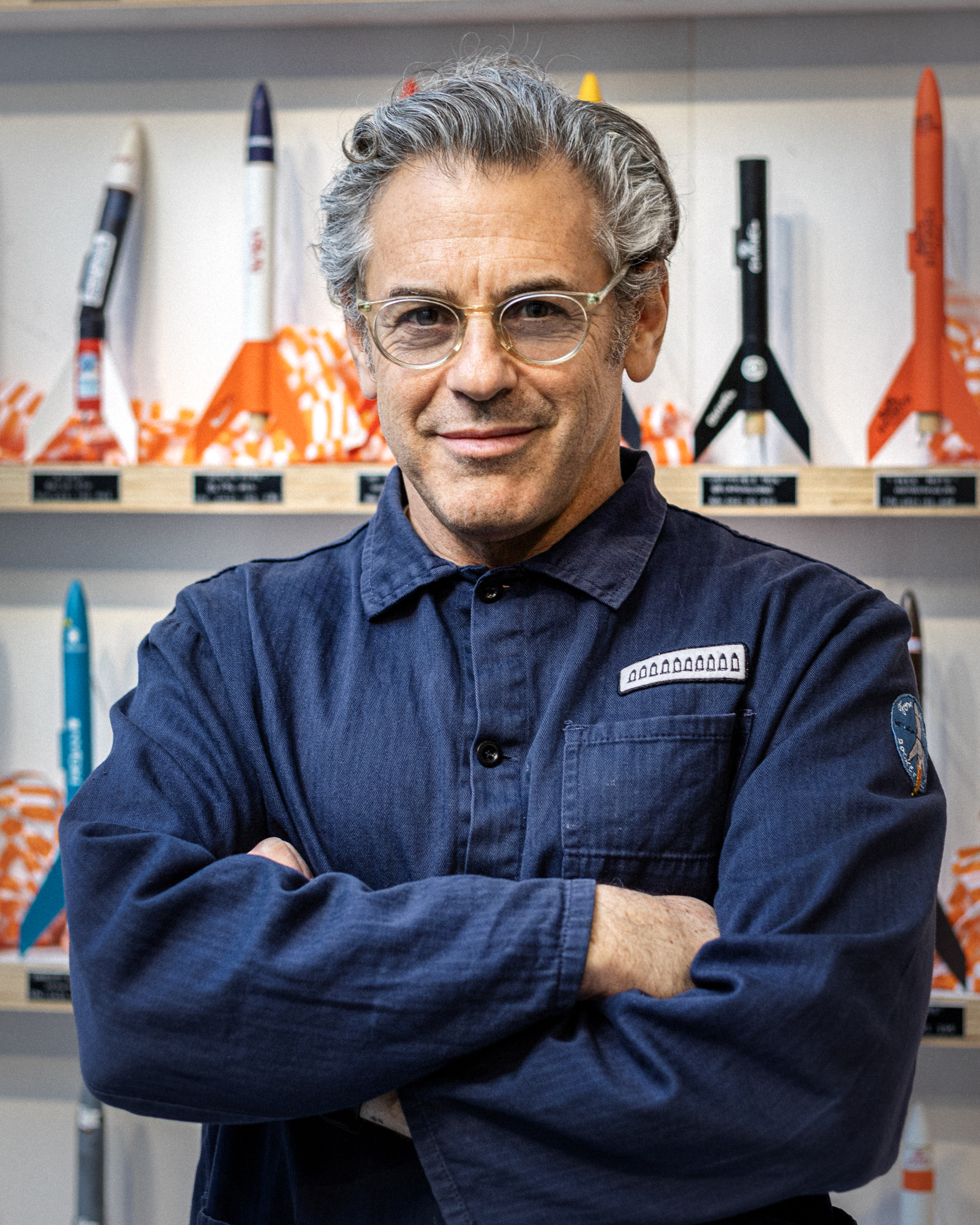
- Born: July 26, 1966 (age 60); New York City, US
- Known for: Sculpture
- Spouse: Sarah Hoover (m. 2012)
- Website: tomsachs.com

Tom Sachs (born July 26, 1966) is an American artist who lives and works in New York City.

== Life and early career ==
Sachs was born in New York City on July 26, 1966, and raised as a Reform Jew. He grew up in Westport, Connecticut, attending high school at Greens Farms Academy, followed by Bennington College in Vermont. Upon graduation, he studied architecture at London's Architectural Association School of Architecture before deciding to return to the States. He then spent two years working in Frank Gehry's L.A. furniture shop, where he began using the term knolling.

Around 1990, Sachs moved from L.A. to New York. He founded a studio in the disappearing machinery district downtown called Allied Cultural Prosthetics, which took its name from the previous tenant—Allied Machine Exchange—implying that contemporary culture had become nothing but a prosthetic for real culture.

For a few years Sachs worked odd jobs, including lighting displays at Barneys New York. In 1994, he was invited to create a scene for their Christmas displays and titled it Hello Kitty Nativity, in which the Virgin Mary was replaced by Hello Kitty with an open Chanel bra, the three Kings were Bart Simpsons, and the stable was marked by a McDonald's logo. This contemporary revision of the nativity scene received great attention (not all of it positive) and demonstrated Sachs' interest in the phenomena of consumerism, branding, and the cultural fetishization of products. Alongside his study of cultural propaganda and dedication to the art of the tea bowl, Sachs has also cited plans to branch into stand-up comedy.

== Career ==
In the mid and late 1990s, Sachs' career began to take off. His first major solo show, "Cultural Prosthetics", opened at New York's Morris-Healy Gallery in 1995. Many works from the show conflated fashion and violence, as with HG (Hermès Hand Grenade) (1995) and Tiffany Glock (Model 19) (1995), both of which were models made with Hermès or Tiffany packaging. Although these sculptures were non-functional, another piece – Hecho in Switzerland (1995) – was an actual working homemade gun. Sachs and his assistants would make similar guns and sell them back to the city as part of New York's gun buyback program (for up to $300 each).

His next major show, "Creativity is the Enemy", opened in 1998 at New York's Thomas Healy Gallery and Paris' Galerie Thaddaeus Ropac. It built on the discourse established in "Cultural Prosthetics" with sculptures like Chanel Guillotine (1998) and Prada Deathcamp (1998). Other pieces, like Hermés Value Meal (1998), moved away from explicit references to violence and paired fashion with other successful brands, like McDonald's. Also included in the show were gaffer's tape versions of Piet Mondrian's famous compositions . Like the Hermes sculptures, the Mondrian paintings were things Sachs desired but could not have, so he made them instead. As Sachs puts it, "making it is a way of having it."

Similar shows opened the following year at Galerie Thaddaeus Ropac in Salzburg, Austria, and Mary Boone Gallery in New York, where Boone was famously arrested after Sachs allowed visitors to take live ammunition from an Alvar Aalto vase. Around the same time, Sachs' SONY Outsider (1998) opened at SITE Santa Fe in New Mexico. The sculpture was outwardly a full-scale model of the atomic bomb that was dropped on Nagasaki, and was a leap from handmade art into expensive outsourced fabrication. Ultimately, it was not well received by critics or even the artist himself – he later published a zine titled "The Failure of SONY Outsider"). For many, including Roberta Smith, the well-known New York Times art critic, the piece "bore no trace of Mr. Sachs's hand" and "could have been the work of several other artists." As Sachs says about the piece: "At the time I didn't fully grasp the value of my handcrafted things ... I should leave it to Sony or Motorola to make those perfect things."

Learning from this experience, Sachs fully embraced the practice of "bricolage". For Sachs, a bricoleur is one "who hobbles together functional contraptions out of already given or collected materials, which he re-tools and re-signifies into new objects with novel uses, but more importantly, which he regenerates into a new, oscillating syntax: one of loss, gain, and more than anything, one of play." After the failure of Sony Outsider, Sachs began to focus on leaving visible traces of his work, saying this a few years later:

We have our system of making things out of certain materials ... and of showing the scars of our labor and the history of our efforts ... We have the "your way", "my way", and "the right way," and I must insist everything is done my way, even if it takes longer.

Sachs organized an exhibition at Sperone Westwater in 2000 entitled "American Bricolage" that featured the work of 12 artists including Alexander Calder, Greg Colson, and Tom Friedman.

After several solo exhibitions in New York and abroad, "Nutsy's" opened at the Bohen Foundation (New York City) in 2002 and Deutsche Guggenheim (Berlin) in 2003. The large-scale installation covered a whole floor, and invited viewers to interact by driving remote-controlled vehicles on asphalt tracks throughout the installation. Several of Sachs' most famous works debuted at this exhibition, including Unité, Nutsy's McDonald's, and Barcelona Pavilion. Unité, in particular, is one of Sachs' masterpieces—a 1:25 recreation of Le Corbusier's Unité d'Habitation made completely out of foamcore. The Neistat Brothers, who began their careers working for Sachs, were instrumental in the operation of "Nutsy's".

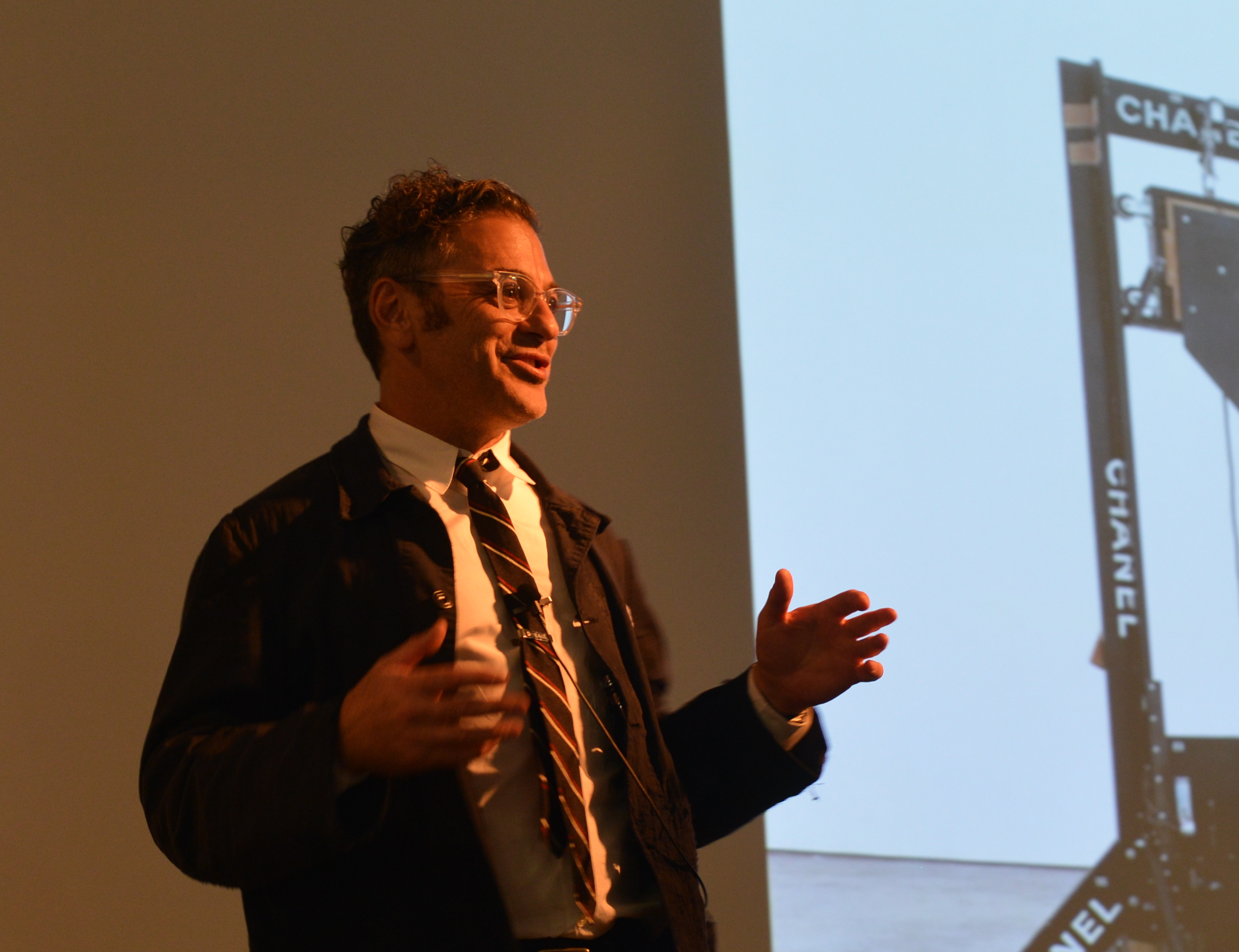
Tom Sachs discussing "Sculpture. Simulacrum. Ritual." on October 17, 2016 at Berkeley Center for New Media.

In 2006, the artist had two major survey exhibitions mounted in Europe, first at the Astrup Fearnley Museet for Moderne Kunst and next at the Fondazione Prada, Milan. His work can be found in major museum collections worldwide, including the Metropolitan Museum of Art, New York, The Solomon R. Guggenheim Museum, New York, the Whitney Museum of American Art and the Centre Georges Pompidou, Paris.

As Germano Celant writes in his monograph on the artist published by the Fondazione Prada, Milan, "The images and objects that make up the militarized space of consumption and fashion are at the very heart of Tom Sachs's visual passion."

The Des Moines Art Center and Rose Art Museum hosted a solo exhibition titled Logjam featuring the artist in 2007.

In 2012, Sachs partnered with Nike to release the Mars Yard sneaker. Ten years later, Sachs and Nike released a new sneaker called the General Purpose Shoe. Nike quietly altered the packaging for a sneaker collaboration with artist Tom Sachs in 2017, scrubbing the box of his NikeCraft Mars Yard 2.0 shoe of the phrase "work like a slave" before the project launched that year, sources tell Complex. The shoes nearly made it to retail with the phrase on the inside of the lid of the box before Nike moved to have the text removed, sources say.

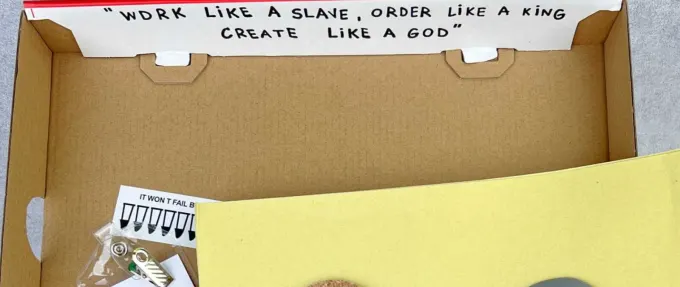
A box for a replica pair of the Tom Sachs x Nike Mars Yard 2.0 showing the full Brancusi quote

The Nasher Sculpture Center held a solo exhibition titled Tom Sachs: Tea Ceremony in 2017, which focused on Sachs' distinctive reworking of chanoyu, or traditional Japanese tea ceremony. The exhibition was originally organized by The Noguchi Museum in New York.

Sachs has printed several decks of custom playing cards featuring photos of his artwork.

In 2023, Sachs came under fire from past studio employees for creating a cult-like and fear-inducing work environment. Past workers told Hyperallergic about how difficult it was to quit. "It is like a true cult in that they make it really hard to leave," they said, citing "manipulation and threats." One former studio manager told Curbed, "It's almost as if he goes out of his way to sow discomfort and pawns it off as if he's a genius. It's like a ruse. So many people out there know that he's cruel, but the art world is tiny and no one gives a shit." The revelations caused Nike to release a statement that the company was "deeply concerned by the very serious allegations". "We are in contact with Tom and his studio, seeking to better understand the situation and how these issues are being addressed," the company said. Others have since come out in support of the artist, citing Sachs' irreverence as ubiquitous.

Sachs is represented by Thaddaeus Ropac, Acquavella Galleries, Tomio Koyama Gallery, and Baldwin Gallery.

== Space Program ==
Sachs had built numerous space-related sculptures throughout his career (such as Crawler, 2003 and Lunar Module (1:18), 1999). His obsession with space, and specifically the Apollo program of the 1960s and 1970s, culminated with his Space Program in 2007. Sachs built a 1:1 model of the Apollo lunar module, a mission control with 29 closed-circuit video monitors, and outfitted two female astronauts with handmade Tyvek space suits. In October 2007 at Gagosian Gallery in Los Angeles, Sachs launched his spacecraft, landed on the "Moon", and explored its surface.

While the Apollo program was source of precedent, much of Sachs' Space Program is historically inaccurate, often humorously. The Lunar Excursion Module (LEM) was built full-scale, but had many modifications that were probably not on any Apollo mission, including a fully stocked Vodka bar and a library (with titles such as Woman's Almanac). After the astronauts' first step, they used Sachs' handmade shotguns to "patrol the surface", before planting a flag and taking rock samples—by drilling into the gallery floor. Much of Apollo's TV footage was restaged using special effects sculptures that Sachs made himself, including ones that reproduced the Saturn V takeoff, the Moon landing, and the reentry of Apollo's capsule in Earth's atmosphere.

Sachs continues to work on developing the Space Program, noting after the exhibition in 2008, "The Space Program continues in full force... Such is the nature of improvised construction technique." After collecting twelve pounds of fake "Moon rocks", he named each significant piece and encased them in carefully constructed display boxes, like with Florida. In addition, Sachs allows followers to download an up-to-date "Moon Rock Report" that includes detailed information on each collected sample.

In May 2012, Sachs opened the Space Program 2.0: MARS exhibit at the Park Avenue Armory in New York. Much of the 2007 Space Program equipment was included, as well as new bricolage sculptures for the challenges of colonizing Mars: Terraforming with poppy plants—and an accompanying opium tea ceremony—a Mars rover, and a solar-powered boombox.

As of 2021–2022, the current edition of Space Program is exhibited in the Deichtorhallen in Hamburg, Germany.

== Bronze Collection ==
In 2008 and 2009, the artist's Bronze Collection was shown at Lever House, Baldwin Gallery (in Aspen, CO), and the Trocadero in Paris. The collection featured large white bronze casts of foamcore Hello Kitty and Miffy foamcore sculptures—a particular style distinctive to the artist. In addition, unpainted casts of battery towers, a skateboarding halfpipe, and Le Corbusier's lamps were also shown.

== Knolling ==
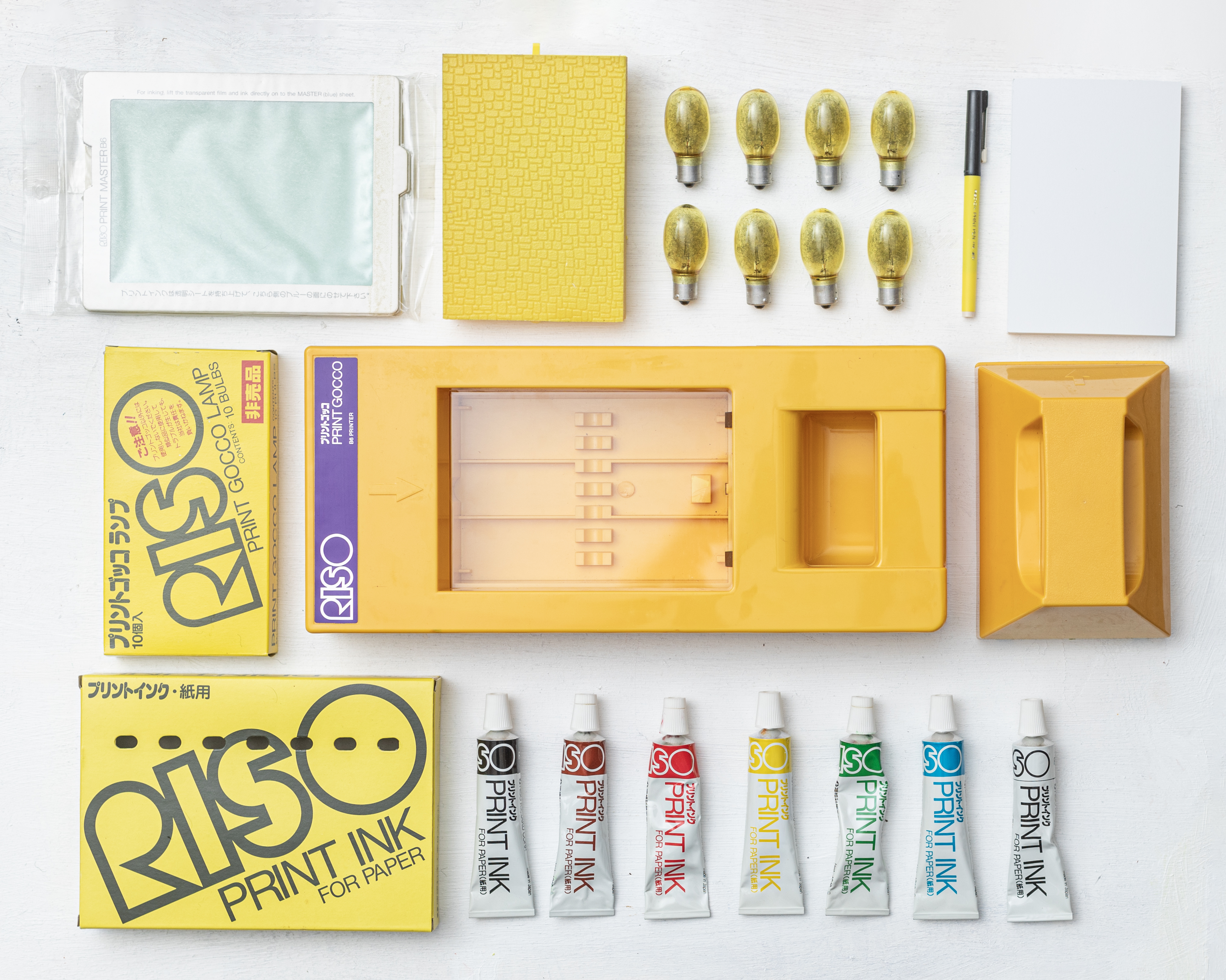
The elements of this Print Gocco system have been arranged in a knolled manner.

The term knolling was first used in 1987 by Andrew Kromelow, a janitor at Frank Gehry's furniture fabrication shop. At the time, Gehry was designing chairs for Knoll, a company known for Florence Knoll's angular furniture. Kromelow would arrange any displaced tools at right angles on all surfaces, and called this routine knolling, in that the tools were arranged in right angles—similar to Knoll furniture. The result was an organized surface that allowed the user to see all objects at once.

Sachs spent two years in Gehry's shop as a fabricator and adopted use of the term from Kromelow. Knolling is now integral to his process. Sachs adopted the phrase "Always be Knolling" (abbreviated as ABK) as a mantra for his studio (in direct reference to Blake's "Always be Closing" in Glengarry Glen Ross), which he expands on in his 2009 studio manual, 10 Bullets:

BULLET VIII: ALWAYS BE KNOLLING (ABK)

1. Scan your environment for materials, tools, books, music, etc. which are not in use.
2. Put away everything not in use. If you aren't sure, leave it out.
3. Group all 'like' objects.
4. Align or square all objects to either the surface they rest on, or the studio itself.

Knolling is present in Sachs' oeuvre in pieces like Hardcore, a cabinet filled with objects neatly arranged at right angles. He has also had a long-time obsession with Knoll furniture, most evident in pieces like Knoll Loveseat and End Table (currently at the San Francisco Museum of Modern Art) and Barcelona Pavilion, both full-scale replicas of Knoll furniture of the same name. Knolling is also present in the work of Casey Neistat, Sachs' former employee. Users on Instagram refer to a similar style to "knolling" as "flatlay" design, but with less rigidity and less formality. Brands like Gap and Sephora have used knolling in their advertising. Dwell magazine describes knolling as the opposite to the "Kondo-ing" practice of discarding and purging items, whereas knolling emphasizes keeping and organizing.

== See also ==
- 5S (methodology)
- Shadow board

== General and cited references ==
- Celant, Germano (2006). Tom Sachs (2nd ed.). Fondazione Prada. ISBN 88-87029-37-7.
- Fleming, Jeff (2007). Logjam. Des Moines Art Center. ISBN 978-1-879003-49-1.
- Sachs, Tom (2008). Space Program. Gagosian Gallery. ISBN 978-0-8478-3226-2.
