= Professional organizing =

Using organizing principles to design process and organize spaces

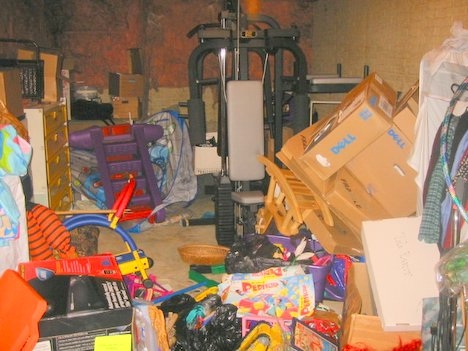
Basement, before tidying

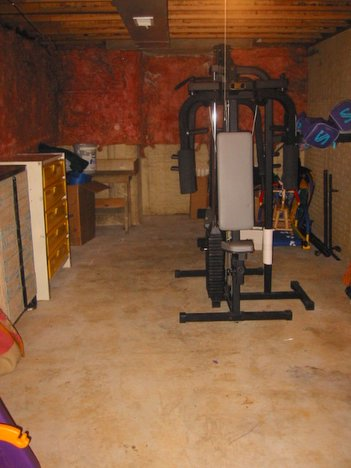
Basement, after tidying

Decluttering means removing unnecessary items, sorting and arranging, or putting things back in place. The phrase is most often used to refer to organizing places of residence and commercial buildings, but the principles can also be applied to other areas. The activity can be done independently, or with help from family, friends, or professionals.

There are many methods for systematic decluttering and organizing. Some examples include Julie Morgenstern's SPACE, Danshari, and Konmari. In Danshari, a distinction is made between minimalists (who try to minimize their belongings) and those who try to optimize their belongings.

== History ==
Cutting out unnecessary things, letting go of superfluous things, and becoming free of one's attachment to things has roots in several philosophies, such as Buddhist philosophy and Christian philosophy.

In 1984, professional organizing emerged as an industry in Los Angeles, USA.

In 2009, Hideko Yamashita introduced the Danshari method in her book Danshari: Shin Katazukejutsu (original title: 人生を変える断捨離). Danshari is constructed by the words dan (refuse), sha (dispose) and ri (separate). In 2010, Danshari was nominated for a prize for new buzzwords awarded by the Japanese publisher Jiyuukokuminsha.

Since then, there has been a resurgence of other authors and influencers sharing their decluttering methodologies. A notable example is the Konmari decluttering method named after Marie Kondo. In 2015, she was listed as one of the world's 100 most influential people by Time Magazine.

== Professional organizers ==
A professional organizer helps individuals and companies with organization. In addition to the actual organizing process and implementation of systems and processes, it can be just as important that the client learns methods so that they can maintain order and master organizing independently in the future. They can help clients identify the severity of clutter and how it may impact the safety of their space

As one of their main jobs, professional organizers help clients reduce excessive clutter (paper, books, clothing, shoes, office supplies, home decor items, etc.) in the home or in the office.

For homeowners, a professional organizer might plan and reorganize the flow and space of a room, improve paper management, consult on organizing skills (space, data, objects) or productivity skills (time, information, priorities) such as calendaring or task management, or coach in time-management, or goal-setting. This may also include body doubling.

In a business setting, professional organizers work closely with their clients to increase productivity by streamlining paper filing and storage of digital files, organizing supplies or inventory, and assisting with employee time management.

Organizers may be additionally trained in brain-based challenges such as left and right-brained strength/dominance, ADHD, OCD, hoarding, autism, chronic disorganization (CD), dementia, Alzheimer's, other vulnerable populations, and special populations such as children, students, creative-types and seniors.

== In popular culture ==
The organizing industry has been popularized through a number of TV programs. Among others, the British reality show Life Laundry ran for three seasons from 2002 to 2004. Other examples of English-language programs include Clean Sweep, Neat, Mission: Organization, Tidying Up with Marie Kondo, Hot Mess House, and Get Organized with The Home Edit and The Gentle Art of Swedish Death Cleaning.

== Methods ==
There are different decluttering methods and frameworks that can be used either by individuals by themselves or under the guidance of professionals. The methods can be used from simple tasks such as designing a functional closet to complex tasks such as organizing a cross-country move.

=== SPACE method ===
Writer Julie Morgenstern suggests communicating these principles by using the acronym "SPACE", interpreted as:

- Sort
- Purge
- Assign a home
- Containerize
- Equalize

The last step ("E") consists of monitoring how the new system that has been created is working, adjusting it if needed, and maintaining it. This principle is applicable to every type of organization.

=== Danshari method ===
In the danshari method of Hideko Yamashita, the three parts of the word dan-sha-ri refers to:

- Refuse: Refrain from unnecessary things you come across or are offered
- Dispose: Throw away unnecessary or unused things
- Separate: Let go and free yourself from attachment to things or desires for superfluous things

Rejecting what is not needed, throwing it away and refraining from depending on it is said to open one's mind, approach perfection and lead an easier and more comfortable life.

=== Konmari method ===
In the konmari method of Marie Kondo, one begins by collecting all of one's belongings, one category at a time, and then chooses to keep only the things that spark joy and choose a place for everything from then on. Kondo advises to start the process of decluttering by quickly and completely throwing away what is in the house that does not inspire joy. Following this philosophy will recognize the utility of each item, and help the owner learn more about themselves, which will help them more easily decide what to keep or discard.

Kondo says her method is partly inspired by the Shintō religion. Decluttering and organizing things properly can be a spiritual practice in Shintoism, which is concerned with the energy or divine spirit (kami) of things and the right way of living (kannagara). This can be done by showing the valuable objects you own as (not necessarily actual monetary value) so that you can value the object.

=== No-mess decluttering method ===
Developed by author and blogger Dana K. White, the "No-Mess Decluttering Method" is designed specifically for individuals who experience "decluttering paralysis" or are easily overwhelmed by traditional methods that require emptying a space entirely (the "pull everything out" approach). A key rule of the method is "taking it there right now," which eliminates the creation of "keep piles" or "sorting piles" that can lead to a larger mess if the decluttering session is interrupted. The method prioritizes "progress and only progress," and follows a fixed five-step process:

1. Visible trash is removed first to provide immediate results without requiring difficult decisions.
2. Items that already have a designated home elsewhere in the house ("easy stuff") are moved there immediately.
3. Items that are obviously destined for donation ("duh clutter") are placed in a "donatable" box.
4. For items without a clear home, White uses two instinct-based questions:
  - "If I needed this item, where would I look for it?" (The item is taken to that location immediately).
  - "If I needed this item, would it ever occur to me that I already have one?" (If not, the item is donated, as the owner would likely buy a duplicate rather than look for the hidden original).
5. The container concept: this is the "limit-based" stage of the method. White defines every storage area (a shelf, a drawer, or the house itself) as a physical container with a finite capacity. Instead of deciding what to get rid of, the owner chooses their favorite items to fill the container until it is full; anything that does not fit is considered "clutter" by default and must be removed.

== Virtual Organizing ==
Introduction

Virtual organizing is a process to deliver professional organizing services. Professional organizing and productivity guidance is provided virtually or remotely in real-time or recorded communication. Instruction uses the technology of internet video conferencing platforms, telephone/text, and email to help individuals, organizations, and businesses organize physical home and office spaces and/or digital files and storage to achieve goals regardless of geographical distance. The goal is to bring efficiency and/or a feeling of peace, calm and control to people’s lives. AI-only assisted methods exist as well.

== History ==
Professional Organizing (and as of 2017 "and Productivity"), making its debut in public record in the 1976 Times article about Stephanie Winston and then getting organized in 1986 in California with the founding of NAPO, has gained public exposure over recent decades through reality television such as Hoarders, Hoarding: Buried Alive, Life Laundry, Clean Sweep, Tidying Up with Marie Kondo, and Get Organized with the Home Edit and niche magazines such as Real Simple in 2000 and reviewed in More Than Pretty Boxes by Carrie Lane.

== Professional Virtual Organizer ==
Using technology of internet video platforms, telephone and email, virtual professional organizers help individuals and organizations organize physical home or office spaces. It is also used to organize digital tools, data, document, cloud storage and accounts, calendar and email management, time, goals, priorities and energy which could include managing files, tasks, calendars, workflows, schedules, projects, teams of people or communications to bring efficiency and/or a feeling of peace, calm and control to people's lives. AI-only assisted methods exist as well.

The professional can either work one-on one with the client by talking them through the decluttering and organizing process via internet video conferencing and screen share in real time, by offering a plan of action to the client after viewing the space, by organizing digital items in question independently through a remote connection, and one-on-one or group workshops.

In the in real time technique of one-on-one or group organizing via video conferencing software, the clients roll up their sleeves as the professional talks them through each item to help them determine if it should be kept, sold, given away, donated, up-cycled, recycled, shredded or trashed or specially disposed of safely. If physically unable, a local on-site assistant can be trained as an intermediary to act as the "hands-on" for the client following the professional's guidance closely without adding any input that would confuse leadership of the process.

Although existing long before the COVID-19 pandemic, the virtual technique was catapulted by the increased need for in-home services that were safe.

Overall, virtual organizing helps simplify the management of digital and physical spaces, allowing people to handle their personal and professional responsibilities more efficiently. By bringing greater order and clarity to everyday tasks and possessions, it can also support improved productivity.

Virtual Organizing Professional: A trained professional consultant, possibly with credentialing, who uses technology of telephone and/or internet to provide decluttering and organizing guidance, support and expert advice to individuals and companies using assessments, techniques and procedures for best productivity and/or feeling of peace. A virtual organizing and productivity consultant can provide the same support as an in-person/on-site professional. If a client is physically unable to move objects where the work is to be performed, a local on-site assistant can be employed to be the "hands" of the consulting remote virtual organizing professional. If a client is deaf they can work with the help of an interpreter to bridge the gap. The ultimate goal of a certified organizing professional is to transfer skills to client(s) so they can learn to successfully organize and maintain belongings independently.

For homeowners, a professional virtual organizer might plan and reorganize kitchens and pantries, closets, offices, living rooms, entryways, hallways, dining rooms, game rooms, bedrooms, bathrooms, attics, garages, out-buildings, future construction and events or advise in productivity related services such as time-management or goal setting. In a business or organizational setting, professional virtual organizers can do the same as well as work closely with employees to improve productivity.

Some professionals may be additionally certified or trained in specialized areas such as chronic disorganization, productivity, coaching or other niche organizing areas such as financial, genealogy, life transitions, downsizing, move management, multiple homes, space planning, operations, project management, household management, closet design, wardrobe, photos or special populations such as those with chronic disorganization(CD), brain-based, neurodivergent and other executive functioning challenges such as ADHD, OCD, traumatic brain injury, autism, medical fragility, dementia, Alzheimer's disease and bereavement, seniors, children, students, and hoarding disorder. Currently studies are being conducted for the use of virtual augmentation to help those with hoarding disorder manage decluttering anxiety. If a client has an underlying mental health condition the virtual organizing professional will work in tandem with a mental health practitioner.

== See also ==
The Consequences of Clutter: How Hoarding Disorder Affects America's Older Adults, First Responders, and their Communities; Report by Majority Staff of the US Senate Special Committee on Aging chaired by Bob Casey, July 2024.

== Certification ==
NAPO

In April 2007, The National Association of Productivity and Organizing Professionals launched the world-class Certified Professional Organizer® (CPO®) credential administered by the Board of Certification for Professional Organizers® (BCPO®), recognized as the industry standard for professional organizers.

Certified Professional Organizers will perform assessments of client(s)' habits and routines, perception, personal preferences (learning/behavior styles), organizing skills (e.g., space, data, objects), productivity skills (e.g., time, information, priorities), technological/computer skills, physical considerations (e.g., injury, illness, limited mobility), mental health considerations (e.g., ADHD, OCD, hoarding, dimentia) and other factors (e.g., influence of age, religion, culture). They will evaluate the environment's characteristics of physical space (e.g., square footage, power source, doors/windows, furniture and equipment and safety. They will identify external factors (e.g., company policies, family dynamics, lease agreements) and determine available budget.

They will develop a project plan by reviewing their assessment, determining scope, prioritizing objectives, determining tasks, identifying resources such as organizing (e.g., containers/labels), productivity (e.g., calendar/task management systems) and technology (digital storage, cloud-based, online, devices, apps) tools, furniture and equipment, referrals (e.g., other professionals, educational materials), and removal options (e.g., donation, disposal, selling, shredding).They will establish a timeline, estimate costs (e.g., consulting fees, supplies, vendors), and finalize the project plan.

They will implement the approved project plan by teaching, transferring and applying organizing and productivity fundamentals and methodologies (e.g., consolidating, sorting, categorizing, eliminating excess, identifying and optimizing containers, decision-making, maximizing function and usability, process and workflow, goal setting and prioritization, planning and time management, maintaining systems, optimizing personal resources such as energy, money and health, creation of routines and habits, set boundary-setting and delegation.), use communication skills of clarification, negotiation and influence, address challenges and obstacles such as procrastination, perfectionism and scope creep, manage the project (e.g., resources, budget, schedule and expectations and evaluate client satisfaction of processes, timeline and resources. They will follow up and maintain the project by evaluating effectiveness and sustainability of changes, transfer of skills and make recommendations of modifications and resources.

They will recognize and apply the BCPO Code of Ethics and they will attend to protection of records, identity and cybersecurity.

== Chronic disorganization ==
Chronic disorganization (CD) is a term used in the professional organizing industry for disorganization that lasts over a long period, interferes with daily life, and returns despite repeated attempts at self-help. The Institute for Challenging Disorganization (ICD) says it may occur alongside conditions such as ADHD, anxiety, depression, hoarding disorder, post-traumatic stress disorder and traumatic brain injury. Practitioners describe it as a working concept of the organizing field rather than a clinical diagnosis.

The concept grew out of a study group formed within the National Association of Productivity and Organizing Professionals (NAPO), which was later renamed the Institute for Challenging Disorganization. A 2021 newspaper profile describes organizer Judith Kolberg as the person who started ICD. ICD offers education, assessment tools and a Certified Professional Organizer in Chronic Disorganization (CPO-CD) credential.

The term has also been used in general-interest media. In a 2013 column in the ‘’Orange County Register’’, anthropologist Carrie M. Lane described chronic disorganization as long-term, debilitating disorganization and noted that organizers can earn certifications for working with it. A 2015 profile of Dutch organizer Hilde Verdijk in the ‘’Eindhovens Dagblad’’ reported that her clients often have conditions such as autism, ADHD or depression, and that chronic disorganization is also often involved. In 2026, “Upworthy" quoted organizer Alison Lush as saying, ‘’ADHD folks are among the largest population who show up with chronic disorganization,’’ and ‘’cleveland.com’’ reported that a Summit County hoarding task force conference would address “OCD, chronic disorganization and aging."

A doctoral dissertation at Fordham University examined chronic disorganization, self-efficacy and coping as predictors of depressive symptoms in women. Books on the subject include Judith Kolberg’s “Conquering Chronic Disorganization" (1998), ‘’Filled Up and Overflowing’’ (2020) by Diane Quintana and Jonda Beattie, “I’m Right here" (2021) by Jill Yesko and Judith Kolberg, ‘’Overcoming Chronic Disorganization’’ (2024) by Jo Cooke, ‘’A Pragmatic Approach to Chronic Disorganisation and Hoarding’’ (2024) by Linda Fay, and the Dutch-language “Ademruimte" (2025) by Hilde Verdijk.

== Problematic decluttering ==
In some cases, people can get so caught up in clearing that they end up throwing away or selling things that belong to family members without permission of the owners. This can be done either intentionally or unintentionally. This can include collections that are valuable financially and/or emotionally and can be a factor in divorces. It is not necessarily destructive to throw away other people's things, but to avoid misunderstandings it is important for couples who live together to communicate and agree on their values.

After the COVID-19 pandemic, the lack of availability of food and other necessities clarified possible disadvantages of living without stocks of basic supplies. Some minimalists thus changed their mindset accordingly, leading to speculation on whether the number of "preppers" will increase.

== See also ==
Wikibooks

Wikibooks has Housecleaning as well as books on these subjects:

- Housecleaning/Indoor Litter
- Do-It-Yourself/Home staging

- Adjustable shelving
- Bookcase
- Cabinetry
- Closet
- Eurobox, system of reusable containers for transport and storage in standardised sizes
- Filing cabinet
- Kitchen cabinet
- Lean thinking, methods for improving efficiency, effectivity and quality of work
- Mobile shelving
- Pantry
- Personal organizer
- Shadow board, a method for organizing tools
- Shelf (storage)
- Small office/home office
- Study (room)
- Wardrobe
