= The Life-Changing Magic of Tidying Up =

2010 book by Marie Kondo

The life-changing magic of tidying up: The Japanese art of de-cluttering and organizing
- Author: Marie Kondo
- Language: Japanese
- Published: 27 December 2010
- Publisher: Sunmark Publishing
- Publication place: Japan
- Pages: 270
- Website: www.sunmark.co.jp

"The Life-Changing Magic of Tidying Up" (人生がときめく片づけの魔法, Jinsei ga tokimeku katazuke no mahō) or shortly Tidying Magic (片付けの魔法, katazuke no mahō) is a book by Marie Kondo about professional organizing. The book was translated in more than 15 languages and sold worldwide more than 10 million copies.

It was adapted into a television drama on Nippon Television Network in 2013.

== Overview ==
The book presents the KonMari Method, a systematic and spiritual approach to decluttering a home and achieving lasting order. The philosophy centers on performing a single, exhaustive tidying event rather than engaging in continuous, incremental tidying. The fundamental tenet of the method is the selection criterion for determining what to keep: an item must "spark joy"—a feeling of positive connection or affirmation when held. Items that do not spark joy are to be respectfully thanked for their service and discarded.

The process mandates tidying by category, not by location, ensuring that the entire volume of one type of possession is assessed at once. The categories must be addressed in a specific order designed to hone decision-making skills: clothes, books, papers, komono (miscellaneous items), and finally, sentimental items. Completing the discarding phase is emphasized as the crucial first step. Following this, the remaining possessions are given a designated, permanent storage place, often employing Kondo's signature vertical folding and storage techniques. The book suggests that this methodical process forces an individual to confront their relationship with their belongings, leading to profound transformations in lifestyle, confidence, and perspective.

== Publication ==
- The Life-Changing Magic of Tidying Up: Hardcover, Sunmark Publishing, 15 January 2011, ISBN 978-4-7631-3120-1
- The Life-Changing Magic of Tidying Up 2: Hardcover, Sunmark Publishing, 10 October 2012, ISBN 978-4-7631-3241-3
- The Life-Changing Magic of Tidying Up: Hardcover, Sunmark Publishing, 10 January 2014, ISBN 978-4-7631-3352-6
- The Life-Changing Magic of Tidying Up with Illustrations: Small B6 Hardcover, Sunmark Publishing, 10 January 2015, ISBN 978-4-7631-3427-1

== TV drama ==
The Life-Changing Magic of Tidying Up
- Genre: One-Off Television drama series
- Directed by: Toya Sato
- Starring: Yukie Nakama; Natsuna; Mokomichi Hayami
- Composer: Chiho Watanabe
- Country of origin: Japan
- No. of seasons: 1
- No. of episodes: 1

Production
- Producers: Aki Taka; Yuya Fujii (AXON)
- Running time: 1 hour 32 minutes
- Production company: Nippon Television

Original release
- Release: September 27, 2013

It was broadcast as a special drama on Nippon Television Network's Friday Road Show! on Friday, 27 September 2013, from 9:00 PM to 10:54 PM. The film stars Yukie Nakama.

It is an original story based on the original work, depicting a professional tidying counselor who solves the mental problems of clients who are unable to tidy up.

=== Cast ===
- Makiko Norita (President and counselor of the Cleaning Company, nicknamed "Norimaki") - Yukie Nakama (childhood: Aya Koizumi)
- Kaoru Futakotamagawa (Office Lady Who Can't Tidy Up) - Natsuna
- Tsutomu Tsukuba (Cleaning Company Employee) - Mokomichi Hayami
- Harue Fujishima (Owner of the Garbage House) - Mitsuko Baisho (Younger: Kaoru Sawayama)
- Masato Oda (Kaoru's Lover) - Seiji Fukushi
- Kentaro Isoda (Harue's Neighbor) - Bengal (Actor)
- Yukio Fujishima (Harue's Adopted Son) - Hisahide Higashinesaku (childhood: Hayate Torii) Childhood: Takanari Saito)
- Toru Umezawa (Kaoru's boss) - Mr. Chin
- Yumiko Ariga - Yorie Yamashita
- Kazuma Ariga - Eito Suda
- Rina Ariga - Rio Suda
- Masakazu Fujiwara, Momiji Sato, Rie Aoyama, Sachiko Hashimoto

=== Staff ===
- Screenplay - Chiho Watanabe
- Director - Toya Sato
- Music - Hinemos
- Sound Design - Hirohide Shida
- Producers - Aki Taka, Yuya Fujii (NTV AXON)
- Line Producer - Yasuyuki Otsuka
- Associate Producer - Masatoshi Kato
- Production Cooperation: AXON
- Production Copyright: Nippon Television Network Corporation
