= Life Laundry =

British television series

The Life Laundry is a BBC reality TV show that ran for three series from 2002 to 2004. It was first broadcast on BBC Two on 30 January 2002. The show was billed by the BBC as an "interiors programme with a difference", dealing with the transformation of people's homes that had been subject to long-term clutter, and in most case hoarding. The members of the public chosen for the shows had the assistance of professional organising with London-based American home consultant Dawna Walter and house clearance specialist Mark Franks. The show was produced by Sara Woodford.

The first series comprised six episodes and series two and three ten episodes each.

The pattern for the Life Laundry series was repeated in shows made in USA and elsewhere, such as Clean Sweep, Neat, Mission: Organization, Clean House and NeatTV.

Two books were published on the basis of the show:

- Dawna Walter and Mark Franks, The Life Laundry: How To De-Junk Your Life, London, BBC Books, 2002.
- Dawna Walter and Mark Franks, The Life Laundry 2: How to Stay De-Junked Forever. London, BBC Books, 2003.
