= Shadow board =

Device for organizing a set of tools

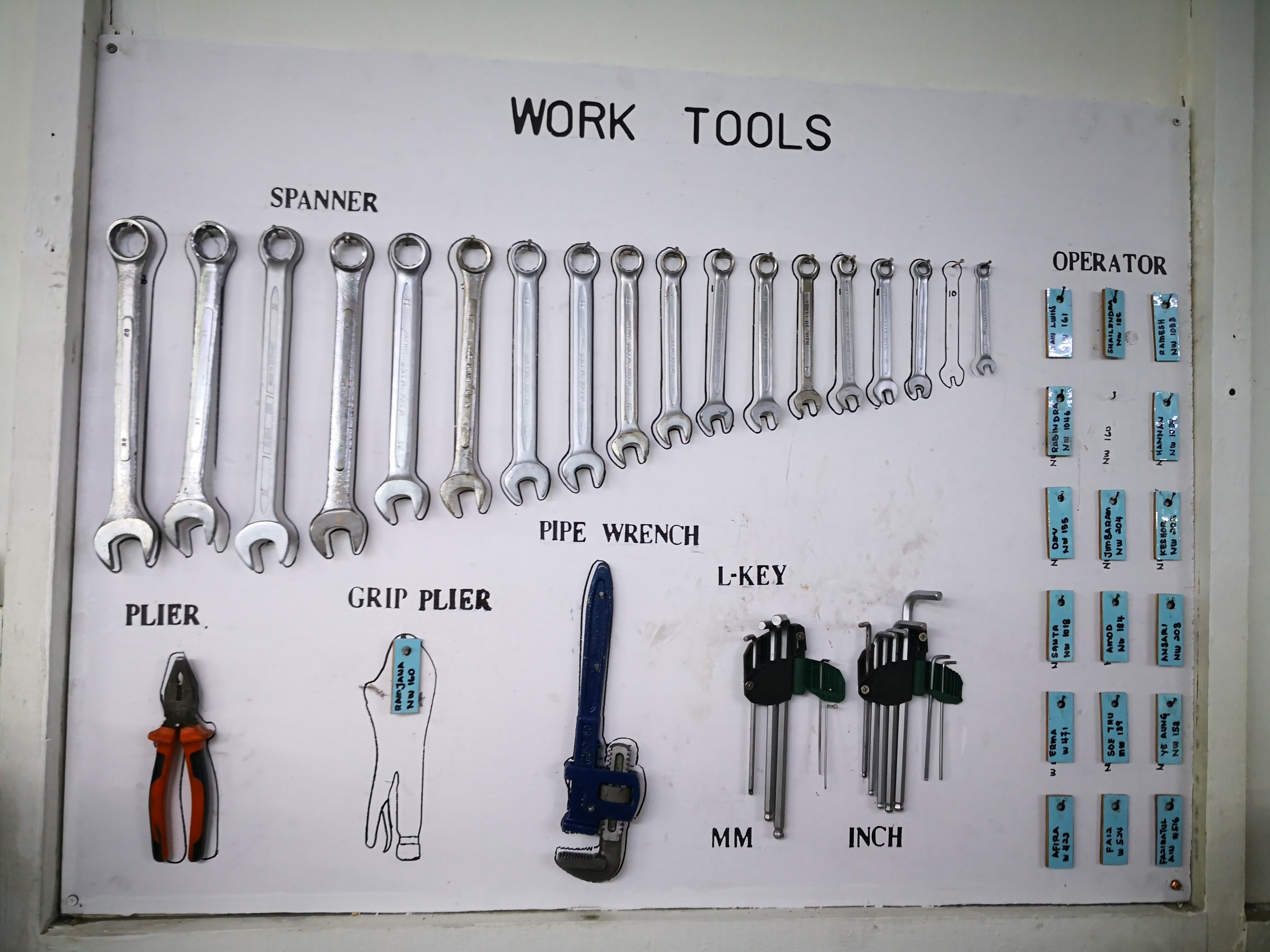
Shadow board for tools used in a production floor

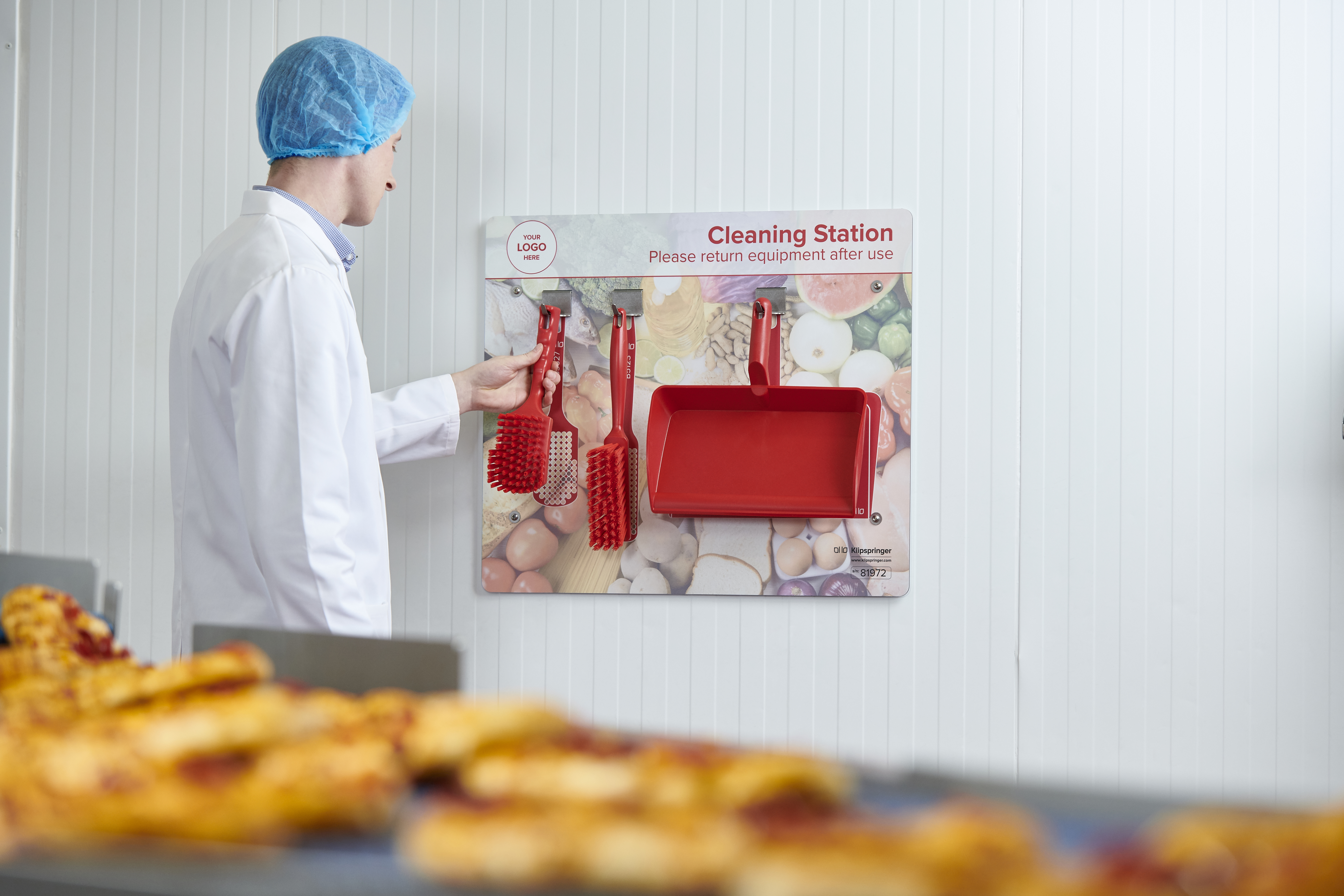
Shadow board used to store and segregate cleaning utensils in a food factory

A shadow board is a type of tool board for organizing a set of tools; the board defines where particular tools should be placed when they are not in use. Shadow boards have the outlines of a work station's tools marked on them, allowing operators to identify quickly which tools are in use or missing. The boards are commonly located near the work station where the tools are used. Shadow boards are often used in the manufacturing environment to improve a facility's lean six sigma capabilities.

Shadow boards reduce time spent looking for tools and also reduce losses. They improve work station safety because tools are replaced safely after use, rather than becoming potential hazards. In environments where lifting equipment is used, shadow boards can support compliance with storage and inspection requirements by keeping lifting accessories visible, organised, and readily accessible.

== See also ==
- Knolling
- 5S (methodology)
- Peg board
