= Danshari =

Japanese neologism

Danshari is a Japanese neologism referring to a form of systematic decluttering and optimization of the things in a home, and is composed of the words dan (refuse), sha (dispose) and ri (separate). It was coined by author Hideko Yamashita to distinguish between minimalists (who try to minimise their belongings), and those who try to optimize their belongings.

== History ==
Hideko Yamashita introduced the concept of danshari in 2009, in her book Danshari: Shin Katazukejutsu (original title: 人生を変える断捨離). In 2010, danshari was nominated for a prize for new buzzwords awarded by the Japanese publisher Jiyuukokuminsha.

== The danshari method ==
In the danshari method of Hideko Yamashita, each part of the word refers to:

1. Refuse: Refrain from unnecessary things you come across or are offered
2. Dispose: Throw away unnecessary or unused things
3. Separate: Let go and free yourself from attachment to things or desires for superfluous things

Rejecting what is not needed, throwing it away, and refraining from depending on it, is said to open one's mind, approach perfection and leading to an easier and more comfortable life.

In the wake of the book, other books have also been published which deal with dismissal in other contexts, and which recommend that it be practiced more in connection with work and relationships.

== Background ==
Yamashita's mother had a collecting mentality rather than throwing things away, and bought storage furniture to accommodate more things. She often complained that the house was difficult to clean, and too small. Then Yamashita asked herself "Why don't you realize that the problem can be solved by reducing the number of things you have?" She felt that the decluttering techniques in conventional books focused more on how to store things, but not what to get rid of, and that people struggled with fear of throwing away things they had acquired. With an inspiration from her background in yoga, she looked for methods to ease fear, and the resulting methods were similar to those used in behavioral therapy.

== See also ==
- Marie Kondo, another Japanese woman who launched the decluttering method konmari a few years later
- Minimalism
