= Dana K. White =

American author and home management expert

- Born: January 22, 1974 (age 52)
- Citizenship: United States
- Occupations: Author; blogger; podcaster; YouTuber
- Years active: 2009–present
- Known for: A Slob Comes Clean; No Mess Decluttering Method; The Container Concept
- Notable work: Decluttering at the Speed of Life; How to Manage Your Home Without Losing Your Mind; Organizing for the Rest of Us
- Children: 3
- Website: www.aslobcomesclean.com

Dana K. White (born January 22, 1974) is an American author, blogger, and podcaster known for her work in the field of decluttering and home management. She is the creator of the "No-Mess Decluttering Method" and the "Container Concept", and has authored several books, including Decluttering at the Speed of Life: Winning Your Never-Ending Battle with Stuff, which was recognized as a Wall Street Journal bestseller in 2018.

== Career ==
White launched her blog, A Slob Comes Clean, in 2009 under the pseudonym "Nony" (short for anonymous). The blog documented her personal "deslobification" process and was noted for its departure from traditional organizational media by focusing on "reality-based" cleaning, targeting individuals who find traditional systems overwhelming.

In addition to her blog, White hosts a podcast of the same name. Her work has been cited by lifestyle publications as a foundational shift in decluttering philosophy, particularly for those who struggle with "clutter thresholds" or chronic disorganization.

In 2023, she appeared as a guest on The Mel Robbins Podcast, where her methods were discussed as a psychological approach to managing household order.

== Methodology ==
White's decluttering framework is distinguished by its focus on immediate progress without creating an "organizing disaster" during the process.

=== No-mess decluttering method ===
The no-mess decluttering method is a five-step process that prioritizes making permanent decisions about items immediately, rather than sorting them into temporary "keep" and "toss" piles that can become new sources of clutter if a project is interrupted.

=== Container concept ===
The container concept is a principle positing that storage areas (shelves, drawers, rooms) should be viewed as finite containers that limit the quantity of items a person can own, rather than as spaces to be "organized" more efficiently.

== Bibliography ==
- White, Dana K. (2016). How to Manage Your Home Without Losing Your Mind: Dealing with Your House's Dirty Little Secrets. Nashville, TN: Thomas Nelson. ISBN 978-0718079956.
- White, Dana K. (2018). Decluttering at the Speed of Life: Winning Your Never-Ending Battle with Stuff. Nashville, TN: Thomas Nelson. ISBN 978-0718080600.
- White, Dana K. (2022). Organizing for the Rest of Us: 100 Realistic Strategies to Keep Any House Under Control. Nashville, TN: Thomas Nelson. ISBN 978-1400231430.
- White, Dana K. (2025). Jesus Doesn't Care About Your Messy House: He Cares About Your Heart. Nashville, TN: Thomas Nelson. ISBN 978-1400344376.
- White, Dana K. (2026). Winnie's Pile of Pillows. Nashville, TN: Tommy Nelson. ISBN 978-1400249510.
- White, Dana K. (2026). Procrastinators Get Stuff Done: How to Go from Overwhelmed to Finished. Thomas Nelson. ISBN 9781400344437.
