= Tool board =

Board for displaying and storing tools

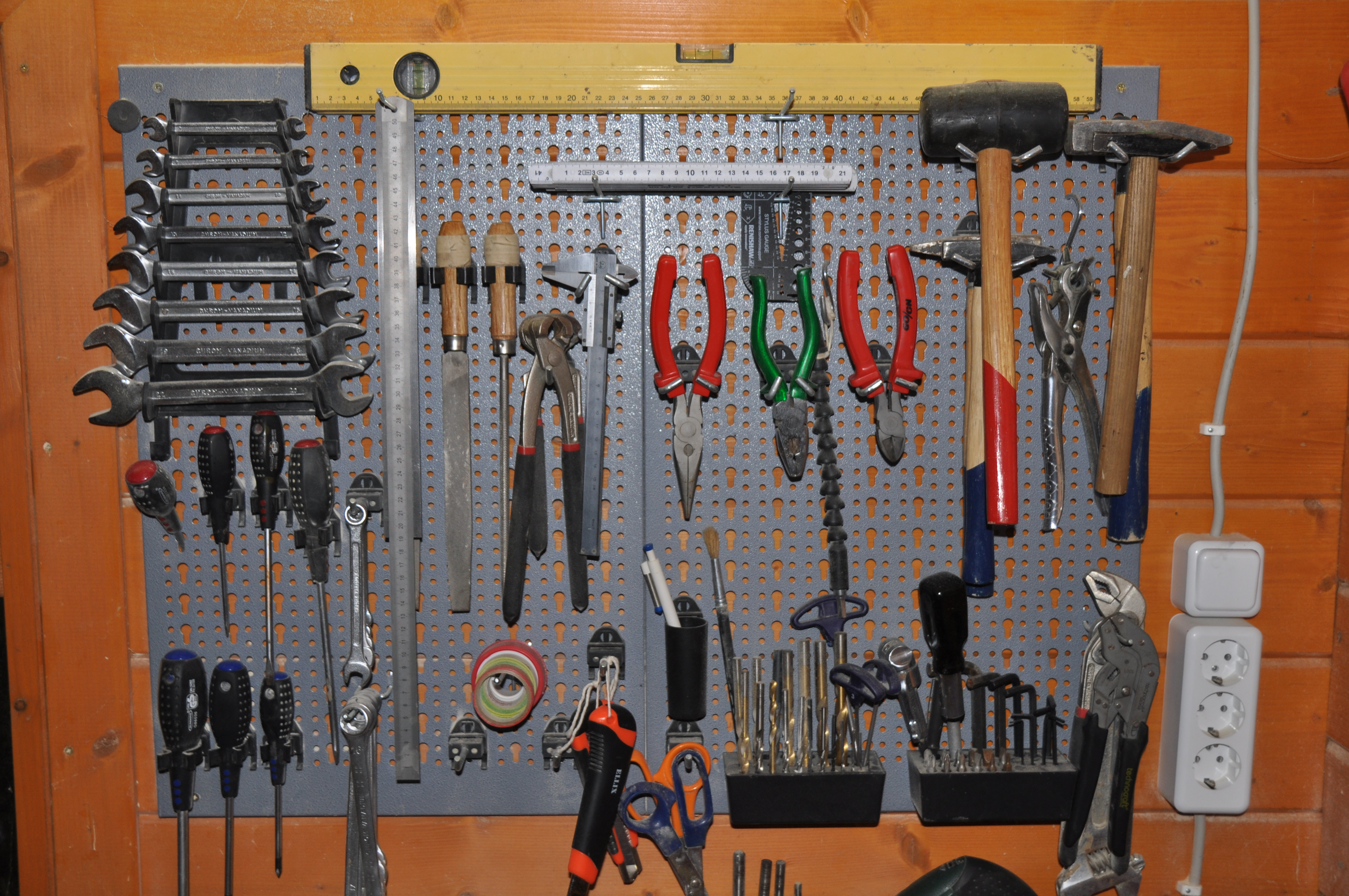
Tool board made of a perforated metal plate

A tool board or tool wall is a board for hanging tools onto, and is typically mounted on a wall or as a folding cabinet which rolls on wheels. Such boards are often found in workshops, and often consists of plates made of wood or metal. The tools are often hanged onto the tool board via hooks, screws, cane holders or other types of tool holders, and these are often attached to the board through pegs.

Compared to a toolbox or tool cart, a tool board can give a better overview so that it is easy to find the needed tools for a job. A drawback of a tool board is that it may occupy a large area on a wall, and that the tools can get less protection from dust. Some recommend to hang heavier tools like hammers at the bottom, and especially wooden tool boards may bend or break from heavy tools if the board is made of fiberboard or other weaker materials.

== Ready-made tool boards ==
Ready-made tool boards are often made of either perforated metal plates or perforated hardboard, and often have brand-specific movable tool holders so that the position of the tools can be rearranged as needed.

== Homemade tool boards ==
When acquiring tool boards for a large workshop, the amount of tool holders needed can result in a high price. As such, it is not an uncommon do it yourself project to build homemade tool boards and tool holders. For example, an old kitchen counter, a pegboard or a plywood sheet could be used as a tool board, with generic screws and hooks used as improvised tool holders.

French cleats are sometimes used for making homemade tool boards.

== Gallery ==
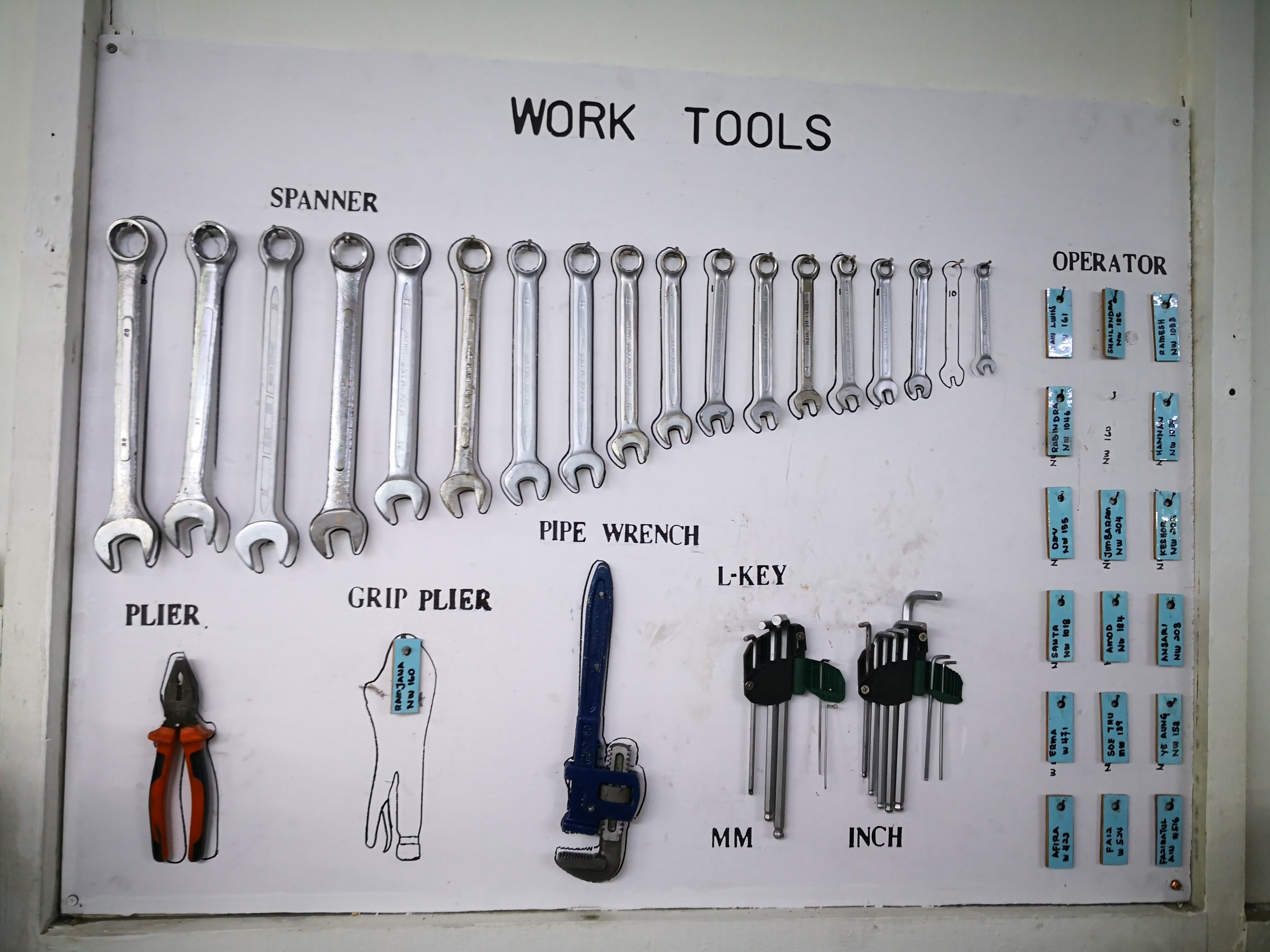
A shadow board is a tool board with markings for the tools

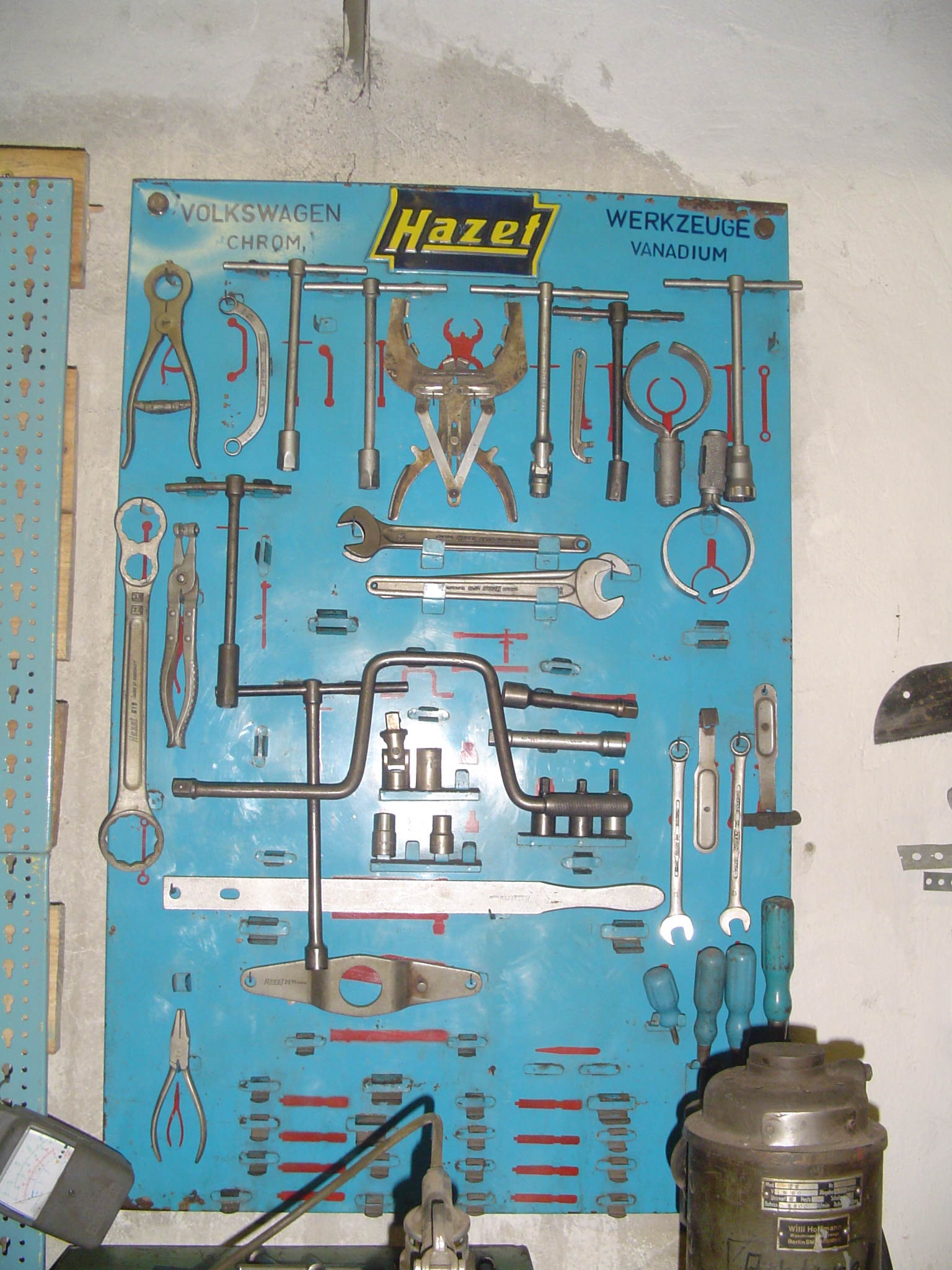
A tool board for 1950s Beetle cars

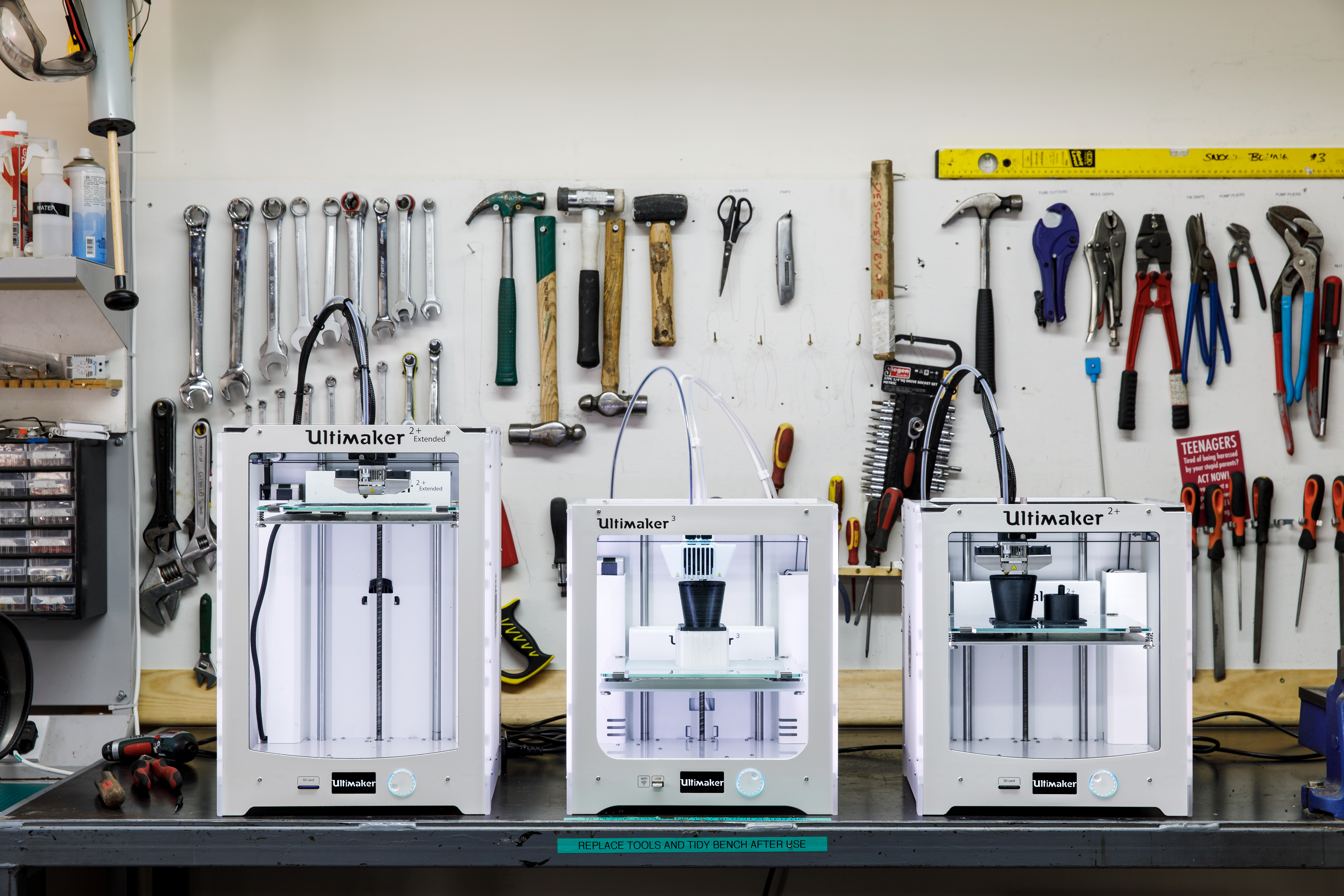
Tool board behind a desk with 3D printers

== See also ==
- Shadow board, a type of tool board with markings to make it easier to put tools back in their place after use
- French cleat, type of molding sometimes used in tool boards to secure objects
- Overhead storage, space-saving storage that frees up floor space and utilizes room volume
