= Tidying Up with Marie Kondo =

Reality television series on Netflix

- Created by: Marie Kondo
- Written by: Marie Kondo
- Directed by: Jade Sandberg Wallis
- Country of origin: United States
- Original languages: English; Japanese
- No. of seasons: 1
- No. of episodes: 8

Production
- Executive producers: Gail Berman; Marie Kondo
- Running time: 35–47 minutes
- Production company: The Jackal Group

Original release
- Network: Netflix
- Release: January 1, 2019

Tidying Up with Marie Kondo is a reality television series developed for Netflix and released on January 1, 2019. The show follows Marie Kondo, a Japanese organizing consultant and creator of the KonMari method, as she visits families to help them organize and tidy their homes. Marie Iida acts as Marie Kondo's interpreter throughout the show.

The show had a notable cultural impact in the U.S. and the UK, where it was reported to have increased donations to charity shops.

In August 2021 Kondo followed up Tidying Up with Marie Kondo with a similar series for Netflix titled Sparking Joy with Marie Kondo.

== Premise ==
In each episode, Kondo visits a different American family household in need of organizing and de-cluttering. Each family has individual backgrounds and needs, which the show addresses with both hands-on guidance from Kondo and cutaways of Kondo giving additional KonMari explanations.

== Episodes ==
No.	Title	Original release date
1	"Tidying With Toddlers"	January 1, 2019
2	"Empty Nesters"	January 1, 2019
3	"The Downsizers"	January 1, 2019
4	"Sparking Joy After a Loss"	January 1, 2019
5	"From Students to Improvements"	January 1, 2019
6	"Breaking Free from a Mountain of Stuff"	January 1, 2019
7	"Making Room for a Baby"	January 1, 2019
8	"When Two (Messes) Become One"	January 1, 2019

== Methodology of the show ==
Kondo's ideology towards de-cluttering is called the KonMari method. Her process, which she explains in the series, includes having participants go through their homes section by section—"1) Clothing, 2) Books, 3) Paper, 4) Komono (kitchen, bathroom, garage and miscellaneous) 5) Sentimental items. Then, when the items are gathered together, Kondo asks the participants to go through the individual items one by one and only keep what "sparks joy".

While her method to cleaning is effective in organizing people's homes and environments, Kondo came to understand that her method was "far more psychological than it was practical." This perspective is supported well by studies done on how people perform and feel in tidy versus messy environments. Research suggests that "clean organized environments" have a variety of psychologically beneficial effects—such as clearer thought processes, increased confidence, and abilities.

Further research shows that an untidy environment can negatively impact many aspects of human health—such as mood and stress levels, memory capabilities, and even the ability to process other people's facial expressions. When people's personal space is "de-cluttered," they are better able to sleep, focus, and hold feelings of satisfaction with their lives.

The evidence that Kondo's show positively affects the mental health of the people featured in it isn't just seen on the show itself, but in interviews given by participants later on. One couple, seen in Episode 1, "Tidying with Toddlers," Kevin and Rachel Friend, said after Kondo's help that, "Chaos for us doesn’t happen anymore. We’re able to take on things. Nothing overwhelms us anymore. Now, it's just our lifestyle."

== Reception ==
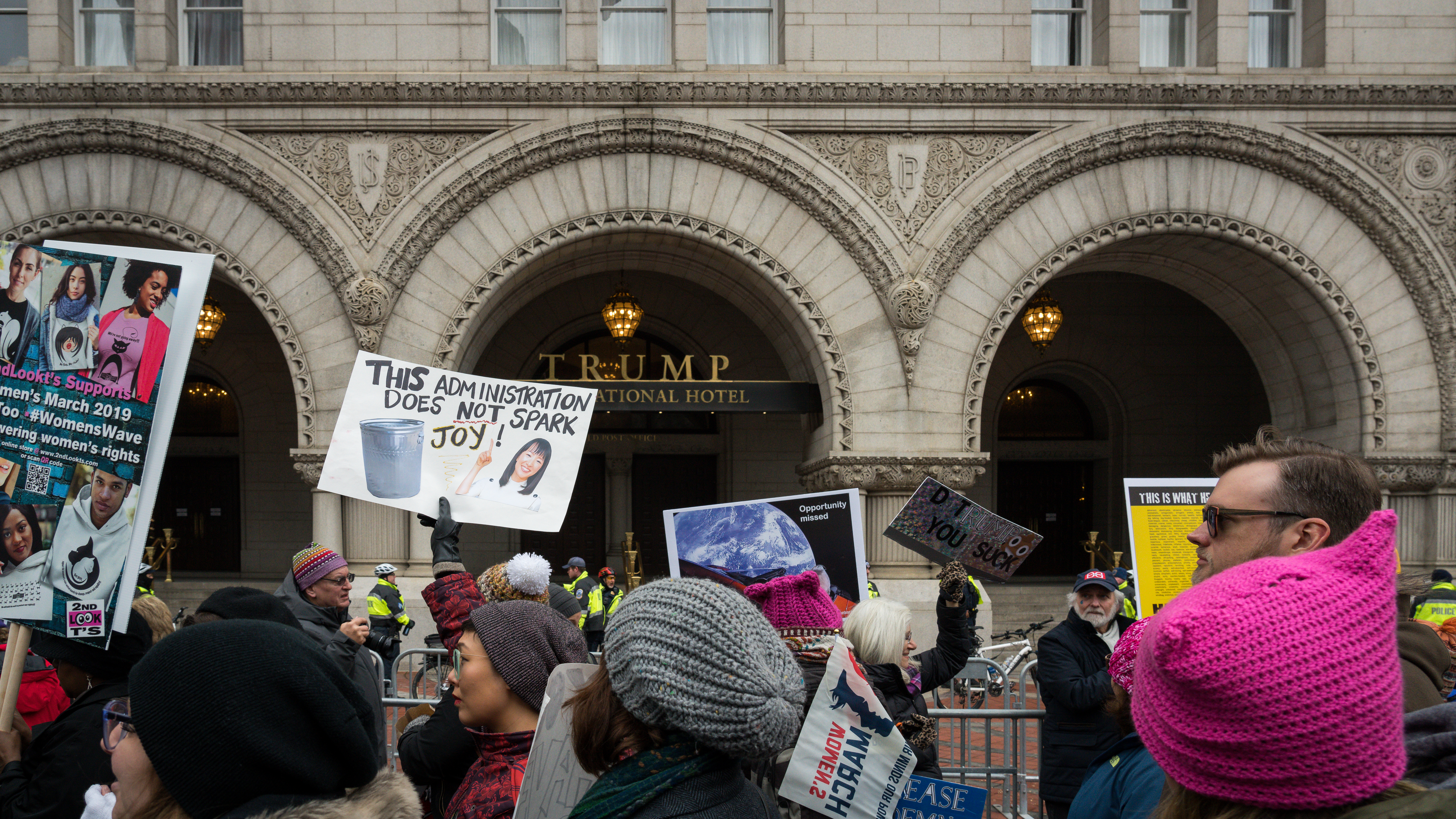
A protester at 2019 Women's March in Washington D.C. holding a sign that reads "This administration does not spark joy!", derived from Kondo's idea of only keeping things that "spark joy"

Reviews of the show have been generally positive. On the review aggregator site Rotten Tomatoes, the show holds a score of 81%, noting that Marie Kondo "makes for a delightful instructor". On Metacritic, the show has a score of 69 based on eight critics, indicating "generally favorable reviews".

In The Atlantic, Sarah Archer says that the show is about "cultivating empathy for the things that surround us", noting that Kondo's empathy is the key to her success in helping people. In Vice, Nicole Clark writes that by showcasing the inner workings of family homes, the show has unintentionally highlighted differing gender expectations towards tidying and organizing households.

Jack Seale in The Guardian is less positive, noting that the show is simply "a show where a woman just tells people to tidy up." He adds that the before and after reveals lack excitement, revealing the same house except tidier.

Others have been on the fence, like Kristin van Ogtrop from Time, who wrote about the "completely bananas" method Kondo employs, suggesting that while necessary items should still be kept around, it is still a worthwhile endeavor to mentally refocus on what brings one joy.

== Effect on donations to charity shops ==
In the immediate wake of the show's release, some charity shops saw an increase in the number of donations received. Donations to Goodwill stores in the Washington D.C. area were up by 66% for the first week of January, an effect attributed to the show encouraging people to tidy their houses. Beacon's Closet in New York also saw similar increases in donations. In western Sydney, charity St Vincent de Paul saw a 38% rise in donations in the first three weeks after the show's premiere. Nationwide, Goodwill reported a 10%–20% increase in donations for the year, as of February 2019, at least part of which it attributed to the show.
