= Overhead storage =

Storage space

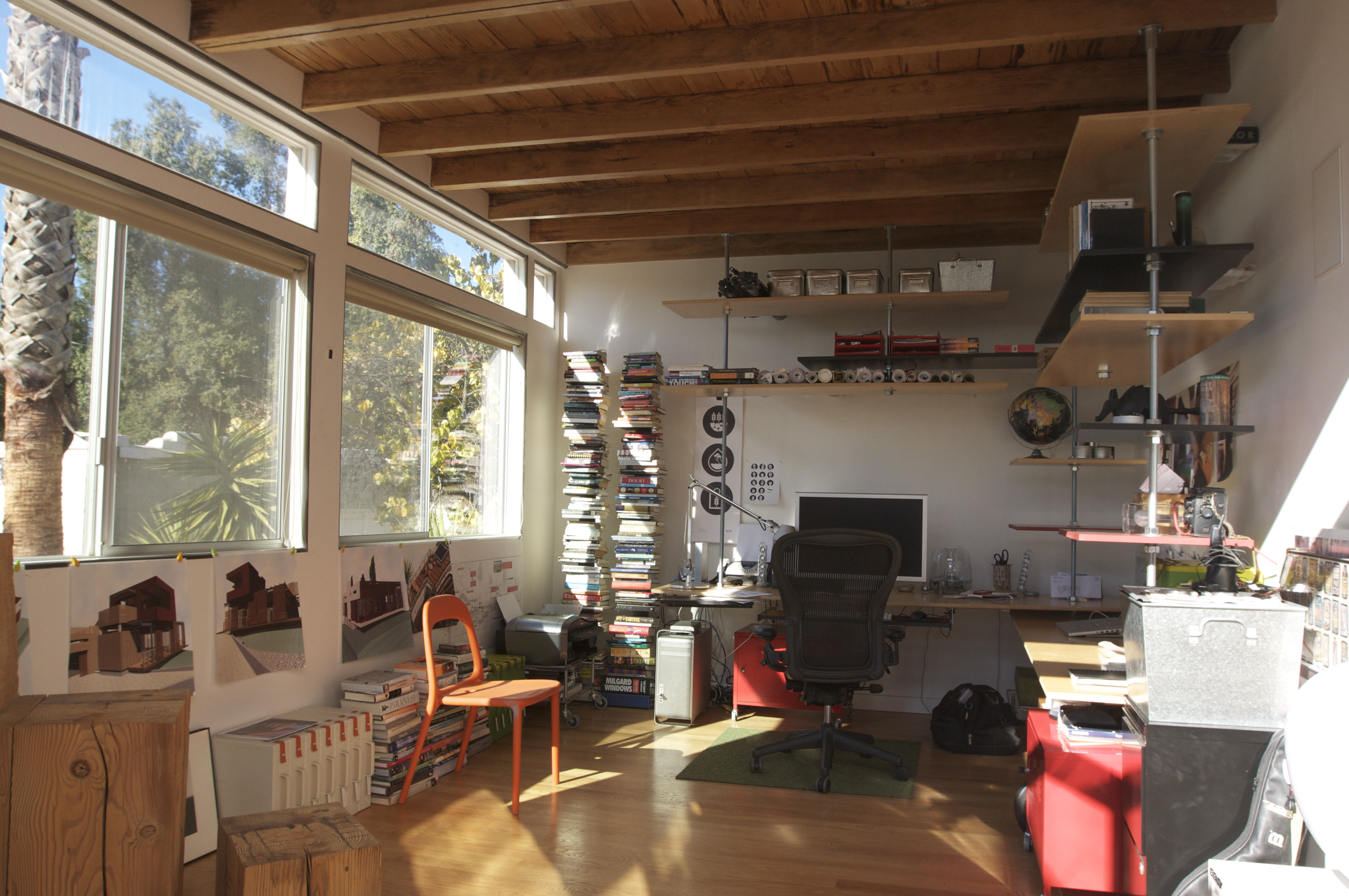
Shelves hanging from the ceiling

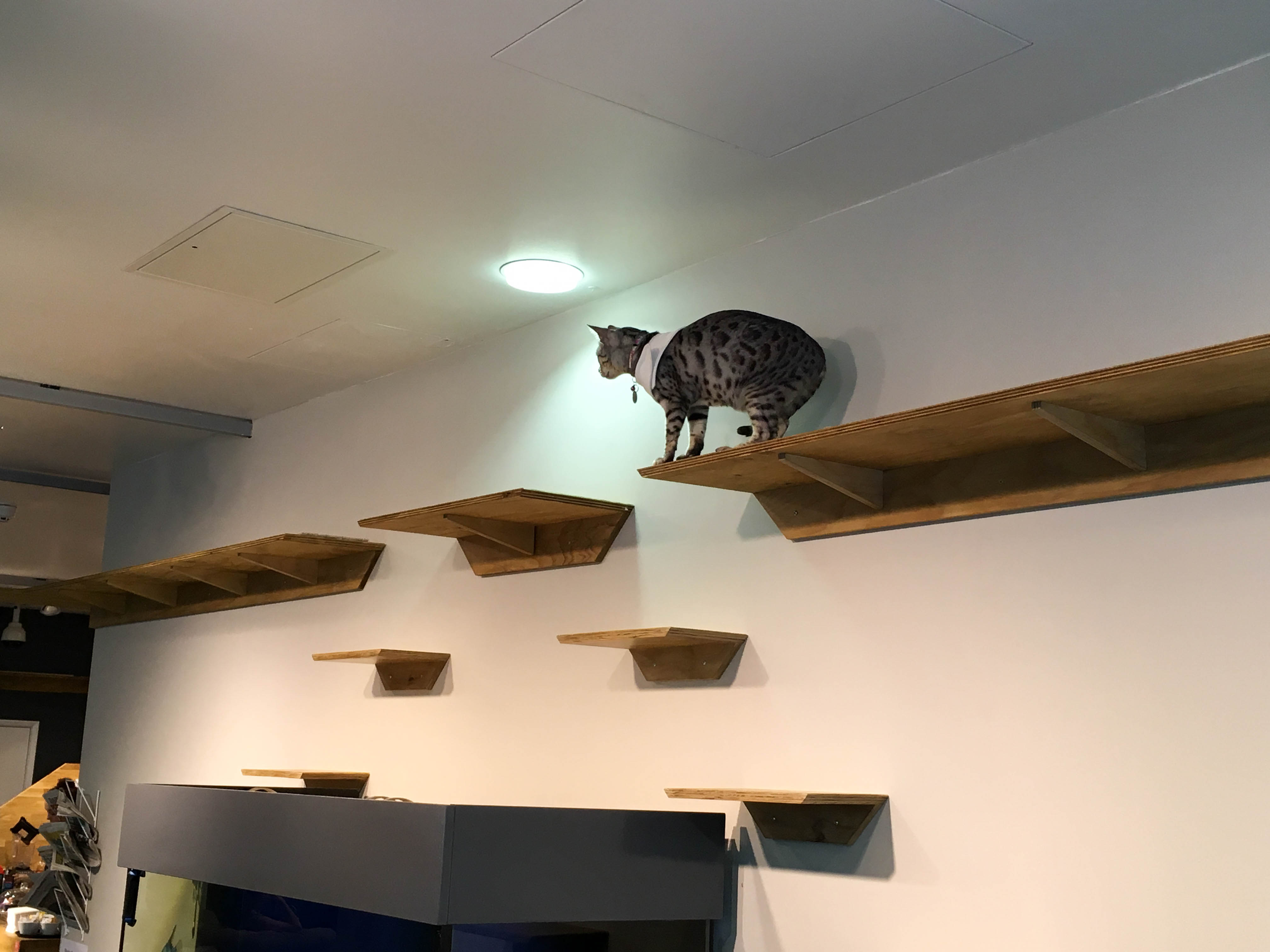
Cat standing on shelves mounted near the ceiling

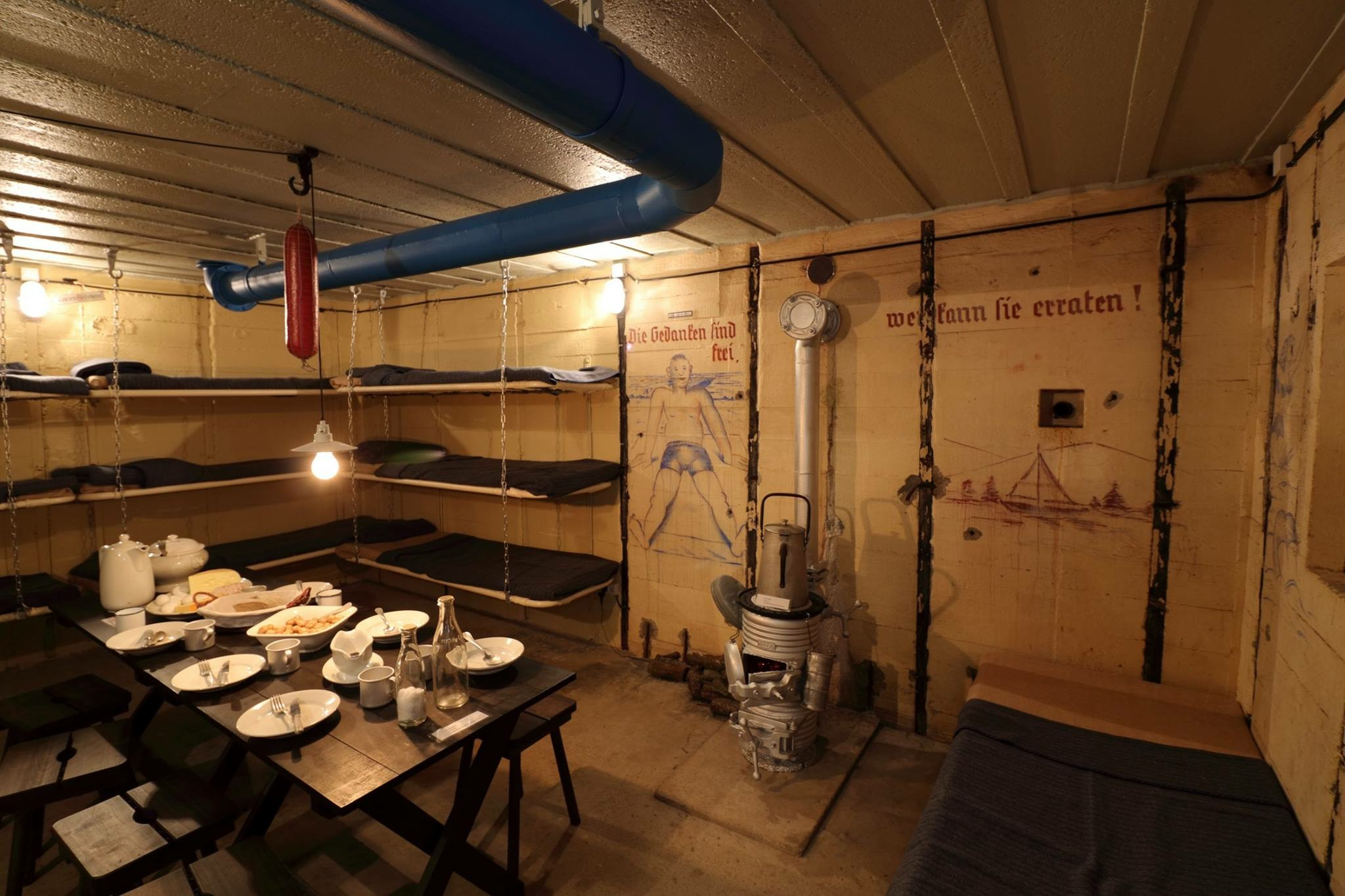
Bunk beds hanging from the ceiling

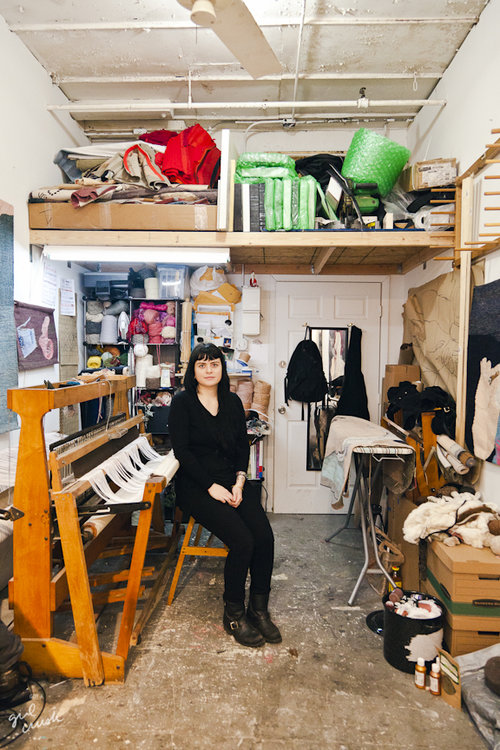
Small storage compartment near the ceiling in a room

Overhead storage can refer to shelves, cabinets, hooks, lift tables or track systems mounted at height (either ceiling-hung or wall-hung), and can be a form of area-saving storage by moving storage up from the floor and utilizing the volume at height.

== In buildings ==
By utilizing the height in a room, floor space can be freed up, and this type of storage can be particularly beneficial in small rooms with good ceiling height. The method is popular for long-term storage in sheds and garages. Examples of items that may be suitable for storage up under the ceiling can include flat equipment such as skis and poles, snowboards, surfboards and skateboards or rarely used items.

There also exists ceiling-mounted drying racks for space-efficient drying of clothes in small rooms.

There also exists area-saving bicycle parking racks where the bicycle is hung from a roof-mounted suspension hook by the front wheel, but such racks may be cumbersome to use regularly.

=== Assembly and weight limitations ===
Ceiling-mounted storage should be mounted securely so that it cannot easily fall down and potentially injure people. For fixing to concrete ceilings it may be appropriate to use anchor bolts, while for fixing to studding it may be appropriate to use lag screws mounted in joists.

In any case, it may be a good idea to think twice before hanging very heavy objects up high. It is not unusual to hang heavy things high in garages, but the arrangement should then be dimensioned for the weight and the objects should be secured so that they cannot easily fall down and injure people.

Roof storage should also preferably be hung so high that tall people do not inadvertently bump into them when while walking underneath.

== For transport ==
In airliners and trains, overhead compartments or bins are shelves that hang from the ceiling where passengers can put their hand luggage. How much hand luggage passengers can bring with them (volume and mass) varies between airlines and ticket types.

== See also ==
- Cabinet, including hanging cabinets from the ceiling and wall-mounted cabinets
- Gallery (theatre)
- Manual handling of loads
- Mezzanine
- Multifunctional furniture, furniture with several functions, often space-saving
- Storage room
- Tool board, a wall-mounted hanger with hooks for wall-hung storage of tools, et cetera
