= Perforated hardboard =

Tempered hardboard with evenly spaced holes

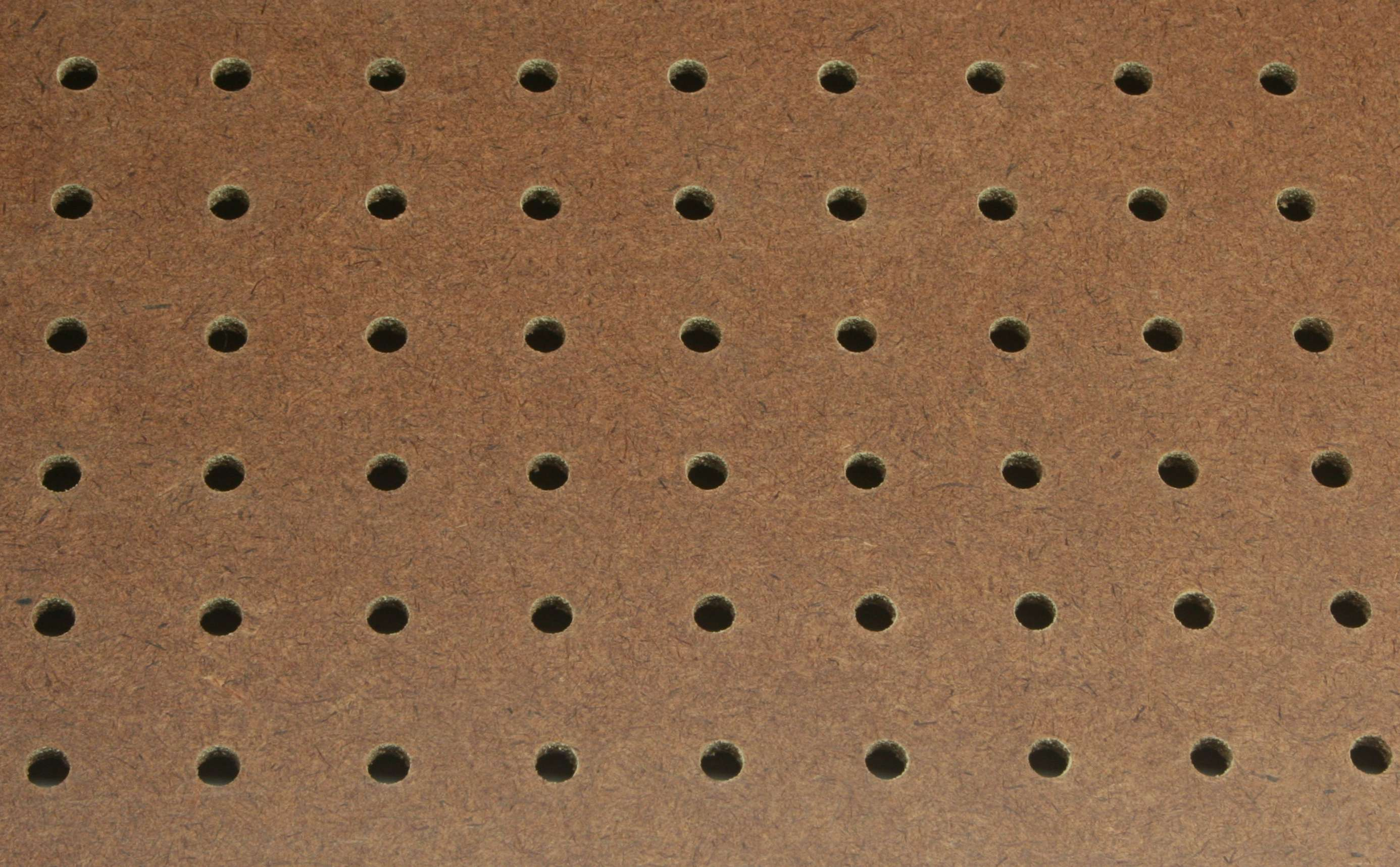
A close-up view of a sheet of pegboard

Perforated hardboard is tempered hardboard which is pre-drilled with evenly spaced holes. The holes are used to accept pegs or hooks to support various items, and perforated hardboards are therefore used for purposes such as tool boards in workshops. Peg-Board is an expired trademark used as a brand name by the Masonite Corporation, first used in 1962, which is often used as a generic term for perforated storage boards made of hardboard, wood, metal, or other material. It is commonly used in retail settings along with steel rods sticking out to hold peggable products such as bagged potato chips, printer ink, and action figures.

== Materials ==
Perforated hardboard and similar systems are made of a variety of materials, each of which has different characteristics that affect the range of possible uses.

Standard perforated hardboard is made of wood fibers, usually with the addition of resin, and tempered by coating with a thin layer of linseed oil and baking at a high temperature to polymerize the oil. This provides more water and impact resistance, hardness, rigidity and tensile strength. Hardboard will bend and warp with age and in the presence of moisture, and will sag under heavy weight (the exact weight is based on the dimensions and quality of the hardboard) unless secured to even weight distribution among several mounting points.

Perforated wood is more labor-intensive to manufacture and will warp and splinter under heavy loads, but is sometimes selected for aesthetic reasons. An inexpensive wood such as pine is often used, and it may be chemically treated for strength and fire retardant characteristics or turned into plywood first. Perforated wood may be mounted as a thin strip instead of the more square shape of perforated hardboard.

Metal pegboard systems are usually made out of steel. Metal pegboards are usually mounted in strips, as it would be comparatively costly, cumbersome and inefficient to sell in larger sheets. Sufficiently thick metal pegboards will not sag between mounting points. Instead, the system's mounting on surfaces such as wood beams or sheetrock will usually fail under a heavy weight before the metal pegboard does. Manufacturers advise customers to hang tools and other gear based on the estimated strength of the mounting points. High quality metal pegboard systems use extruded holes, while other systems have the holes drilled after casting.

== Functions ==
=== Storage and display ===
Perforated hardboard and similar systems are designed to support peg hooks. These are usually mounted by hand and support themselves with gravity alone, though some systems use screws instead. These screws can be supported by additional straps to prevent the metal from bending under a significant load. The hooks in turn act as storage for a variety of objects such as tools and keys. Heavy duty metal systems can support the heaviest objects, such as push lawnmowers and vertically stored bicycles.

These storage systems are usually mounted in utility areas of a household such as a garage, storage shed or workshop. They may also be used in professional environments such as factories, along with the back shelving for discount stores (larger and thicker versions are used by big-box stores), but are rarely seen in more white collar areas of a workplace.

=== Games and education ===
Pegboards are used in games and for educational purposes.

Games based on the pegboard concept include peg mosaic boards, where a child may create pictures and lettering by inserting colored pegs in the board, in a way similar to pixel art. These boards are designed so that the pegs do not fall out when the board is tilted from a horizontal position.

Pre-school and elementary maths and geometry can be taught using a pegboard . Basic operations like sum, subtraction, multiplication and division can be illustrated by moving pegs on the board, in a similar way to an abacus. Concepts like the associative property of sums, multiplication tables, square and triangular numbers, can also be easily demonstrated in a graphical fashion.

=== Exercise ===
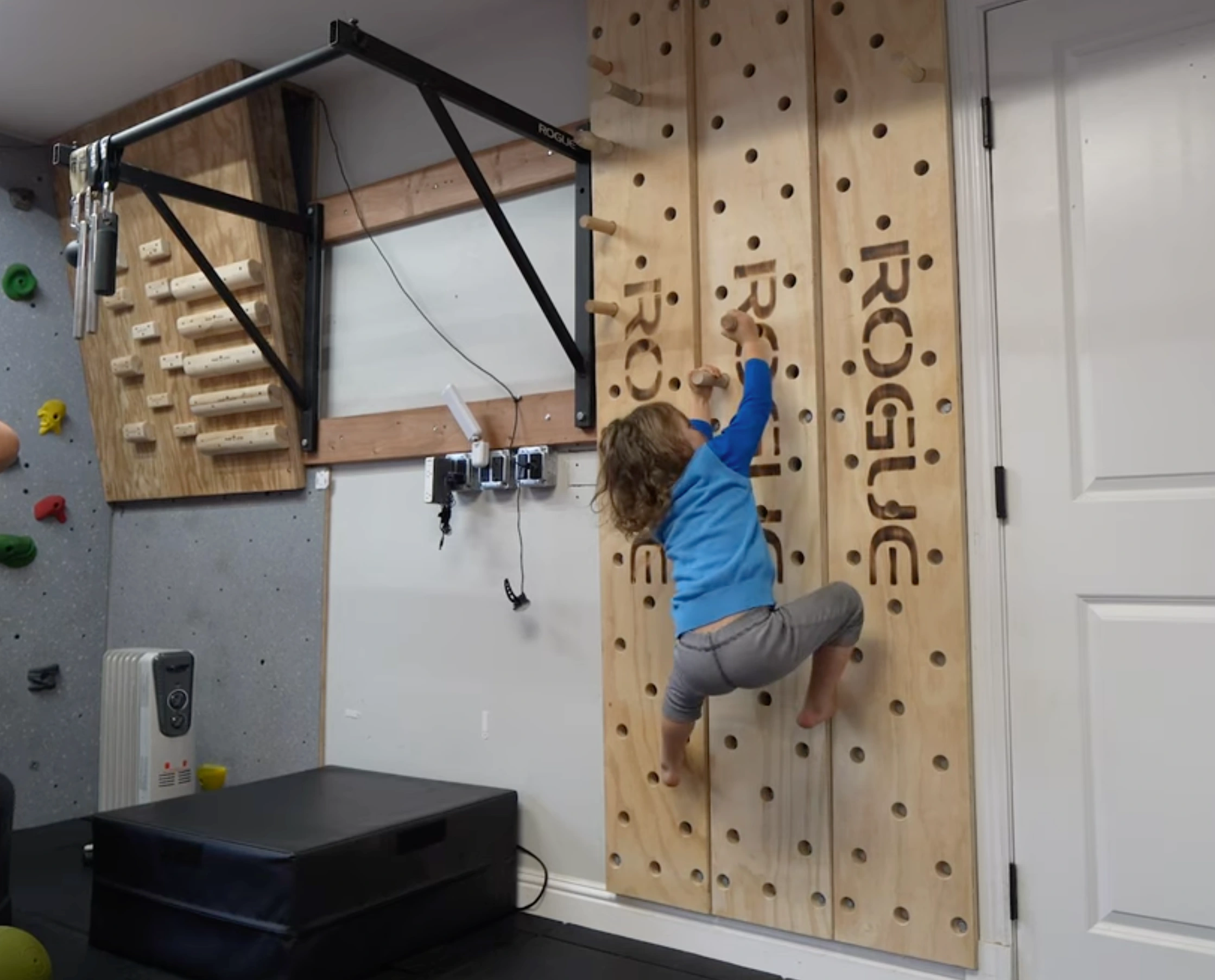
Pegboard

Large vertical pegboard can also be used for climbing exercises, whereby athletes hold two large pegs to insert into the holes of the pegboard to move up the board.

== Typical dimensions and layout ==
These dimensions apply to standardized hardboard systems. Other systems may use their own spacing.

Type	Center spacing	Plate thickness	Hole diameter
Metric	25 mm		4 mm
Metric	25 mm		6 mm
Inch based	1 in (25.4 mm)	1/8 in (3.2 mm)	3/16 in (4.8 mm)
Inch based	1 in (25.4 mm)	1/4 in (6.4 mm)	1/4 in (6.4 mm)
