= Marie Kondo =

Japanese organizing consultant, author, and television show host

- 近藤 麻理恵
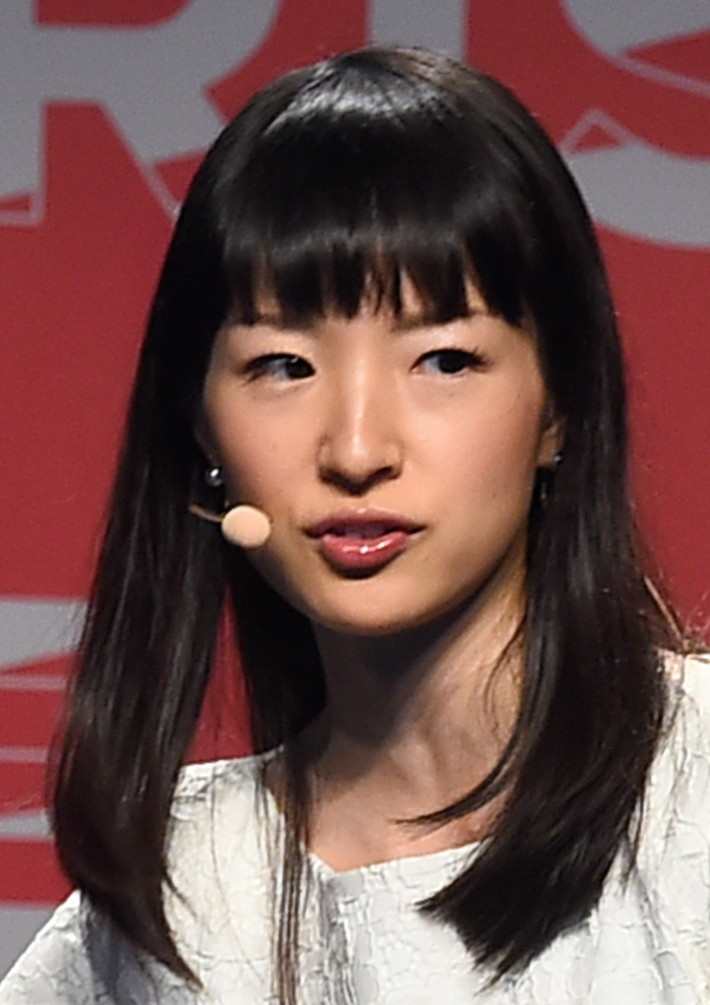
- Kondo in 2016
- Born: 9 October 1984 (age 42); Osaka, Japan
- Education: Tokyo Woman's Christian University
- Occupations: Organizing consultant; author
- Years active: 1997–present
- Known for: KonMari method and organizational books
- Notable work: The Life-Changing Magic of Tidying Up
- Spouse: Kawahara Takumi (m. 2012)
- Children: 3
- Website: konmari.com

Marie Kondo (近藤 麻理恵, Kondō Marie; pronounced [kondoː maɾie], born 9 October 1984), also known as Konmari (こんまり), is a Japanese organizing consultant, author, and TV presenter.

Kondo has written four books on organizing, which have collectively sold millions of copies around the world. Her books have been translated from Japanese into several languages, and her book The Life-Changing Magic of Tidying Up (2011) has been published in more than 30 countries. It was a best-seller in Japan and in Europe, and was published in the United States in 2014.

In 2015 she was named to the TIME 100 list of the world's most influential people.

In the United States and the United Kingdom, the profile of Kondo and her methods were greatly promoted by the success of the Netflix series Tidying Up with Marie Kondo, released in 2019, which gained Kondo a nomination for the Primetime Emmy Award for Outstanding Host for a Reality or Competition Program. Kondo opened an online store called KonMari the same year. In August 2021, Netflix released a follow-up show, Sparking Joy with Marie Kondo.

== Life ==
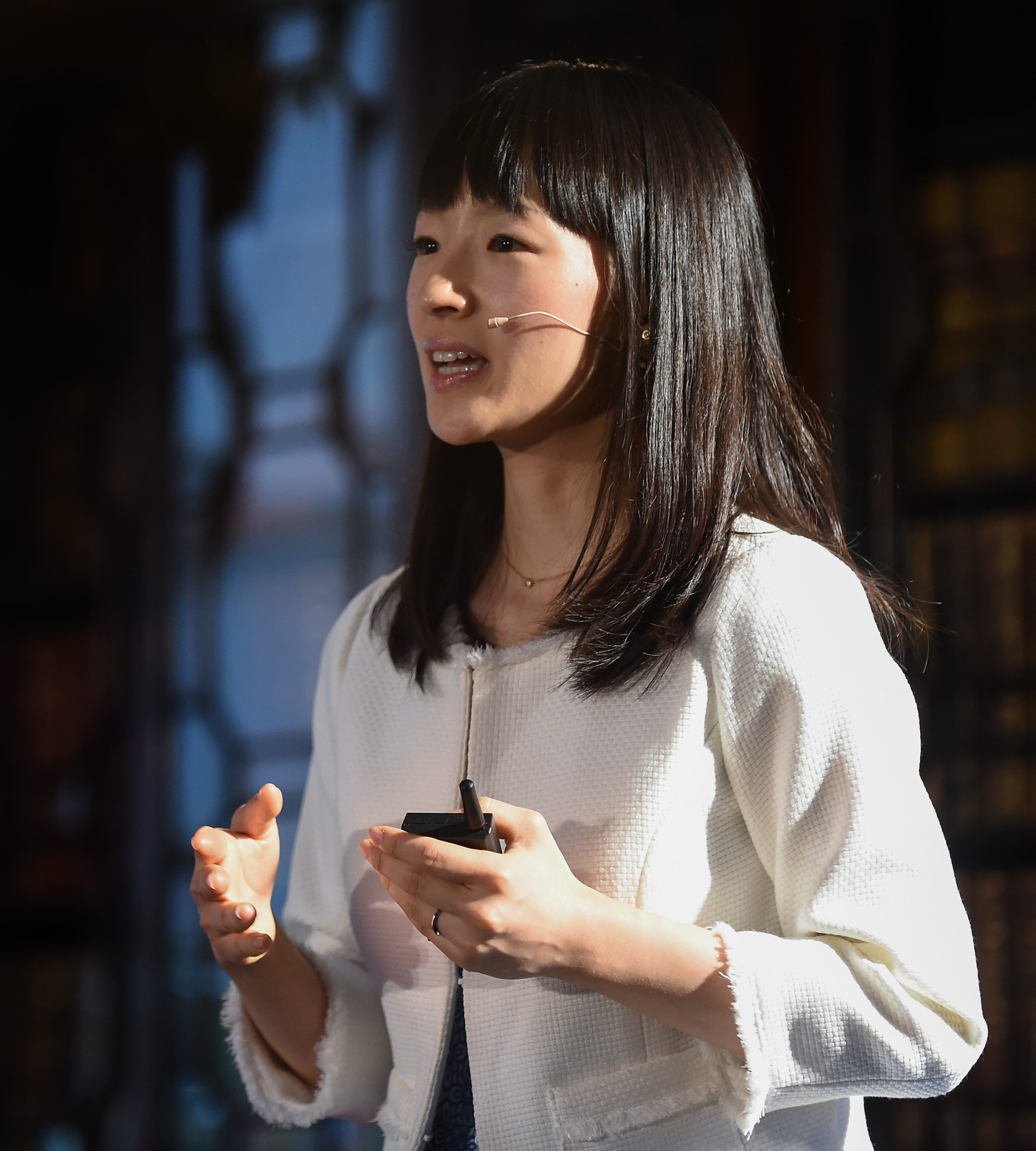
Kondo in 2015 at the Sportsfile Web Summit in Dublin, Ireland

=== Early life ===
Kondo was born on 9 October 1984 in Osaka, Japan. She has an older brother and a younger sister.

Kondo claims her study of neatness began at age 5, when feng shui became trendy in Tokyo, Japan; its Japanese equivalent was called fusui. Her mother "was applying the method, but to [Kondo's] eye, the house was not tidy enough to have the feng shui effect". As a result, Kondo began implementing the "tidying up" process at this age to help her mother's efforts.

=== Education and early career ===
Kondo attended the Chūō Ward Hisamatsu Elementary School.

Afterwards, she attended private Quaker school Friends Girls Junior & Senior High School in Mita, Minato, Tokyo.

In junior school, Kondo ran into the classroom to tidy up bookshelves while her classmates were playing in physical education class. Whenever there were nominations for class roles, she did not seek to be the class representative or the pet feeder. Instead, she yearned to be the bookshelf manager to continue tidying up books. She said she experienced a breakthrough in organizing one day: "I was obsessed with what I could throw away. One day, I had a kind of nervous breakdown and fainted. I was unconscious for two hours. When I came to, I heard a mysterious voice, like some god of tidying telling me to look at my things more closely. And I realized my mistake: I was only looking for things to throw out. What I should be doing is finding the things I want to keep. Identifying the things that make you happy: that is the work of tidying."

She founded her organising consulting business when she was 19 and a sociology student at Tokyo Woman's Christian University. In her senior year, she wrote her capstone thesis, titled "Tidying up as seen from the perspective of gender".

She spent five years as an attendant maiden at a Shinto shrine.

== KonMari method ==
Kondo's method of organizing is known as the KonMari method, and consists of gathering together all of one's belongings, one category at a time, and then keeping only those things that "spark joy", and choosing a place for everything from then on. Kondo advises to start the process of tidying up by "quickly and completely" discarding whatever it is in the house that doesn't spark joy. Following this philosophy will acknowledge the usefulness of each belonging and help owners learn more about themselves, which will help them be able to more easily decide what to keep or discard. She advises to do this by category of items and not their location in the house. For example, all the clothes in the house should be piled up first, assessed for tokimeku, and discarded if not needed, followed by other categories such as books, papers, miscellany, and mementos. Another crucial aspect of the KonMari method is to find a designated place for each item in the house and making sure it stays there.

Kondo says that her method is partly inspired by the Shinto religion. Cleaning and organizing things properly can be a spiritual practice in Shintoism, which is concerned with the energy or divine spirit of things (kami) and the right way to live (kannagara):

Treasuring what you have; treating the objects you own as not disposable, but valuable, no matter their actual monetary worth; and creating displays so you can value each individual object are all essentially Shinto ways of living.

== Media appearances ==
A two-part TV dramatisation was filmed in 2013 based on Kondo and her work, titled 人生がときめく片づけの魔法 (Jinsei ga Tokimeku Katazuke no Mahō). She has lectured and made television appearances. She released a series of videos teaching "the best way to fold for perfect appearance".

On 1 January 2019, Netflix released a series called Tidying Up with Marie Kondo. In the series, Kondo visits various American family homes full of clutter and guides the families in tidying up their houses through her KonMari method. Following the release of her Netflix series, Kondo was the subject of various Internet memes. A clip of her saying "I love mess" included on Time's list of the ten best memes of 2019.

In August 2021, Kondo followed up Tidying Up with Marie Kondo with a similar series for Netflix titled Sparking Joy with Marie Kondo.

Year	Title	Role	Notes
2019	Tidying Up with Marie Kondo	Herself	8 episodes
2021	Sparking Joy with Marie Kondo	Herself	3 episodes

== Personal life ==
Kondo married Kawahara Takumi in 2012. At the time they met, Kawahara was working in sales-support and marketing at a corporation in Osaka. Once Kondo's career was established, he left his job to become her manager and, eventually, CEO of Konmari-Media, LLC.

The couple have two daughters and a son. After getting married, they lived in Tokyo; the couple later moved to San Francisco and then Los Angeles.

After the birth of her third child, Kondo's rigorous attitude towards tidying her home relaxed in order to make room for more personal priorities at this stage of her life.

== Publications ==
- Jinsei ga Tokimeku Katazuke no Mahō (人生がときめく片づけの魔法). Tokyo: Sunmark Shuppan, 2011; ISBN 978-4-7631-3120-1 (in Japanese)
  - English translation. The life-changing Magic of Tidying up: The Japanese Art of Decluttering and Organizing. New York: Ten Speed Press, 2014; ISBN 978-1607747307.
- Jinsei ga Tokimeku Katazuke no Mahō 2 (人生がときめく片づけの魔法2). Tokyo: Sunmark Shuppan, 2012; ISBN 978-4-7631-3241-3.
- Mainichi ga Tokimeku Katazuke no Mahō (毎日がときめく片付けの魔法), Tokyo: Sunmark Shuppan, 2014; ISBN 978-4-7631-3352-6.
- Irasuto de Tokimeku Katazuke no Mahō = The Illustrated Guide to the Life-Changing Magic of Tidying Up (イラストでときめく片付けの魔法）. Tokyo: Sunmark Shuppan, 2015; ISBN 978-4-7631-3427-1.
- Manga de Yomu Jinsei ga Tokimeku Katazuke no Mahō. Tokyo: Sunmark Publishing, 2017;
  - English translation. The Life-Changing Manga of Tidying Up: a magical story. New York: Ten Speed Press, 2017; ISBN 978-0-399-58053-6.
- Joy at Work: Organizing Your Professional Life co-written with Scott Sonenshein. New York: Little, Brown Spark, 2020; ISBN 978-0-3164-2332-8
